= Maksa Ćatović =

Serbian film producer

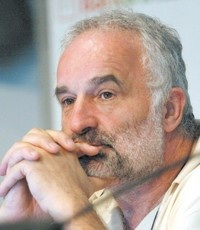
Maksa Catovic

Maksut "Maksa" Ćatović (Serbian Cyrillic: Макса Ћатовић, born 9 October 1950) is a Serbian film producer and former president of production company Komuna.

== Biography ==
Born in Despotovac, PR Serbia, FPR Yugoslavia, Ćatović attended and completed his primary and secondary schooling in Novi Pazar.

From 1985 Ćatović was the owner and CEO of Komuna, working for films including Underground Golden Palm winner (1995) and Black Cat, White Cat Silver Lion winner in Venice (2008).

Ćatović worked as a concert organizer and promoter for Luciano Pavarotti, Madonna, AC/DC, Sting, Metallica, R.E.M, Jethro Tull among many others bands that were playing in Serbia and Montenegro.

== Selected filmography ==
=== Producer ===
==== Films ====
- Dara iz Jasenovca (Dara Of Jasenovac) (2020) by Predrag Antonijevic * Dara of Jasenovac
- Soldier's Lullaby (2018)
- Letete S Rossinant (2007) by Georgi Stoev
- Balkanska Braca (2005) by Boža Nikolić
- The Red Colored Grey Truck (2004) by Srdjan Koljevic
- Margina (2003) by Andrej Aćin
- Poslednji trenutak večnosti by Andrej Aćin
- The State Of The Dead (2002) by Živojin Pavlović
- Normalni Ljudi (2001) by Oleg Novkovic
- Tajna Porodicnog Blaga (2000) by Aleksandar Djordjevic
- Lajanje Na Zvezde (Barking at the Stars)(1998) by Zdravko Sotra
- Black Cat, White Cat (1998) by Emir Kusturica
- My Country (1997) by Milos Radovic
- Underground (1995) by Emir Kusturica
- Pjevam Danju, Pjevam Nocu (1978) by Jovan Ristic

==== TV Series ====
- Drzavni sluzbenik
- Državni posao
- Bunar
- Pevačica
- Dara iz Jasenovca
- Zaspanka za vojnike
- Rokopisac
- Ubice mog oca
- Stižu Dolari
- Porodicno Blago
- Neki novi klinci
- Lisice
- Svastara Duska Radovica
- Bila jednom jedna zemlja
