= Srđan Aleksić =

Yugoslav actor, beating victim (1966–1993)

- Срђан Алексић
- Born: Srđan Aleksić; 9 May 1966; Trebinje, SR Bosnia and Herzegovina, Yugoslavia
- Died: 27 January 1993 (aged 26); Trebinje, Bosnia and Herzegovina
- Cause of death: Murder
- Other name: Srđo
- Occupations: amateur actor, prospective swimmer, and soldier in the Bosnian Serb Army (VRS)
- Known for: being killed while defending an ethnic Bosniak, his friend, who was attacked by a group of VRS soldiers

Srđan Aleksić (Serbian Cyrillic: Срђан Алексић; 9 May 1966 – 27 January 1993), nicknamed Srđo, was a Bosnian Serb amateur actor, prospective swimmer, and soldier in the Army of Republika Srpska (VRS) during the Bosnian War. He saw his neighbour, an ethnic Bosnian Muslim, being harassed by a group of VRS soldiers, whom he then tried to stop; the soldiers turned on Aleksić, beating him with their rifle butts until he fell into a coma. He died a week later at the hospital. He has received several posthumous awards for his act, viewed of as deeply heroic in a time of bloody war. A documentary about his life, Srđo, was made by RTS in 2007.

== Early life ==
Aleksić was born in the municipality of Trebinje, then part of SR Bosnia and Herzegovina, SFR Yugoslavia. His father Rade was a basketball coach, and his mother Mira, from Prijedor, died at an early age. His brother died in a hang glider accident, above the Petrovo field, near Trebinje.

Aleksić received several awards as an amateur actor, and continued to act during the War in Bosnia and Herzegovina, including in a play San ratne noći ("War night's dream"). He was also a prospective swimmer for Yugoslavia. During the Bosnian War, he was recruited into the Army of Republika Srpska.

== Heroic act and death ==
On 21 January 1993 a group of four uniformed VRS soldiers forced Alen Glavović, an ethnic Bosnian Muslim, out of a café by the Freedom Square across the street from the police station, and started harassing and beating him. Glavović was the neighbour of Aleksić; he intervened and went towards them and shouted for them to stop, ending the attack. However, the four soldiers then turned against Aleksić and beat him severely with their rifle butts, leaving him falling into a coma. Due to the incurred injuries, he died in the hospital on 27 January 1993. Srđan's father wrote in his obituary that "Srđan died carrying out his human duty" (Serbian: Umro je vršeći svoju ljudsku dužnost).

One of the attackers was killed during the war, whilst the other three were each sentenced to 28 months in prison. One of the defence lawyers of the attackers said while in court, "Served him right, defending a balija", the latter being a derogatory term for Bosnian Muslims. Alen Glavović, the friend that Srđan saved, survived and fled the war and today lives in Sweden, married with two children. Every year he visits Srđan's grave and Srđan's father with his family. Alen has said that it is his human and moral duty to visit his grave.

== Legacy ==
In 2007 Radio Television of Serbia recorded and broadcast a documentary on Srđan Aleksić, named "SRĐO" (hypocoristic form of Srđan). The Trebinje theatre Slovo, which Aleksić himself had been member of, performed a memorial play, Epilog, about his life. In 2011, filming began for the film Circles (Krugovi), which was inspired by the heroic act of Srđan Aleksić and directed by Srđan Golubović. The Republic of Serbia awarded him the Golden Medal of Miloš Obilić in 2012. Srđan Aleksić was posthumously granted a Charter of the Helsinki Committee for Human Rights of Bosnia and Herzegovina. There is an initiative in Bosnia and Herzegovina and Republika Srpska to officially honour him.

After his death, there has still not been any recognition of him in his home town. The local government of Trebinje is still considering how to honor him in the right way, whether in the form of a monument or a fountain (as of 2012). The former "Street of Great Trees" (ulica velikih drveta) in the Novi Grad municipality of Sarajevo was renamed after him, 15 years after his death, with the municipality saying "Without people like Srđan Aleksić and his heroic deeds, one would lose hope in humanity, and without it our life would have no meaning". A pass is named after him in Zmaj-Jovo's street in Novi Sad, which includes a memorial plaque, and a pass also bears his name in Pančevo.

On July 11, 2013 the Srdjan Aleksic Boulevard was opened near Pobrežje Park in Podgorica, Montenegro, a park dedicated to the civilian casualties of the Yugoslav Wars. A street in New Belgrade, Serbia was named after Srđan Aleksić in early 2016.

In 2013, the Post-Conflict Research Center, a Sarajevo-based NGO, launched its own Srđan Aleksić Youth Competition. The contest, which is run in several cities in Bosnia and Herzegovina, aims to galvanize youths in the country, of all ethnic backgrounds, to share their own stories of inspiration and heroism. The goal is to keep the spirit of Srđan Aleksić alive in young Bosnians today.

Two movies have been produced on the life events of Srđan Aleksić: the 2012 documentary Srdjo, and the 2013 Serbian drama film Krugovi ("Circles"), which won several awards.
