= Nikola Rakočević =

Serbian actor

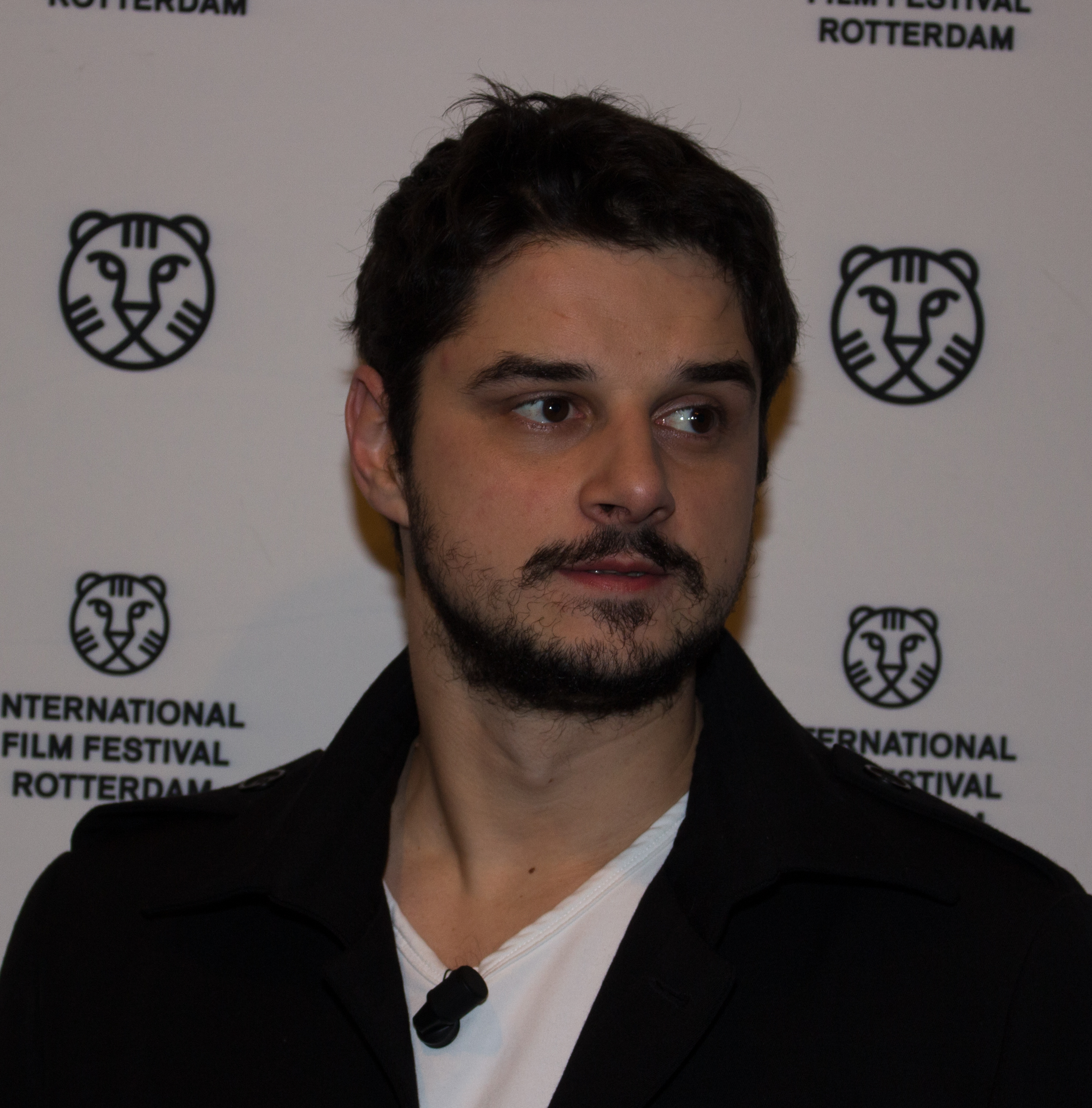
- Nikola Rakočević at the premier of The Sky Above Us at the International Film Festival Rotterdam 2015
- Born: 27 June 1983 (age 43); Kragujevac, SR Serbia, SFR Yugoslavia
- Occupation: Actor
- Years active: 2002–present

Nikola Rakočević (Serbian Cyrillic: Никола Ракочевић; born 27 June 1983, Kragujevac, Serbia) is a Serbian actor proclaimed as one of Europe’s leading young screen actors. Rakočević has received numerous awards at major international film festivals.

The Berlin Film Festival (2014) placed Nikola among its ten European Shooting Stars.

The accolade was just one among many international Best Actor awards to acknowledge the Serbian actor’s talent in feature films such as The Sky Above Us (2015), The Man Who Defended Gavrilo Princip / Branio Sam Mladu Bosnu (2014), Travelator (2013), Circles / Krugovi (2013), and Skinning / Šišanje (2010).

Rakočević has an integral role in the Sky TV/Canal+ crime series The Last Panthers (2015), an acclaimed European drama inspired by notorious Balkan jewel thieves, the Pink Panthers. He voiced Fred in the Serbian-language version of Big Hero 6 (2014).

In 2001, he began his drama study at the University of Belgrade Faculty of Dramatic Arts, from which he graduated in 2005. He lives in Belgrade with his wife and son.

== Selected filmography ==
Year	Title	Role	Notes
2015	Meet Me in Venice	Dragan	
2015	The Sky Above Us	Bojan	
2014	The Man Who Defended Gavrilo Princip	Rudolf Zistler	
2014	Travelator	Slav	
2013	Circles		
2013	Vojna akademija 2	Milan Laki Lakićević	
2011	Oktobar	Dejan	segment "Graduation"
2010	The Woman with a Broken Nose	Marko	
2010	Skinning	Novica	
2009	Život i smrt porno bande	Unnamed theater actor	
2007	S. O. S. - Spasite naše duše	Border guard	
2006	Sinovci	Milan Srećković	
2006	Šejtanov ratnik	Novica	

== Awards ==
- Shooting Stars Award (2014)
