= Ljubav i drugi zločini =

Ljubav i drugi zločini Love and Other Crimes
- Directed by: Stefan Arsenijević
- Written by: Stefan Arsenijević; Srđan Koljević
- Starring: Anica Dobra; Vuk Kostić; Hanna Schwamborn
- Release dates: 10 February 2008 (Berlinale); 19 September 2008 (Serbian theatrical release)
- Running time: 106 minutes
- Country: Serbia
- Language: Serbian

Ljubav i drugi zločini, or Love and Other Crimes in English, is a 2008 Serbian romantic comedy directed by Stefan Arsenijević, and written by Arsenijević and Srđan Koljević, and stars Anica Dobra and Vuk Kostić. The film won Arsenijević an award for Best Director at the 2008 Sofia International Film Festival.

== Cast ==
- Anica Dobra – Anica
- Vuk Kostić – Stanislav
- Milena Dravić – Majka
- Feđa Stojanović – Milutin
- Hanna Schwamborn – Ivana
- Ljubomir Bandović – Nikola
- Ana Marković – Devojka u solarijumu
- Dušica Žegarac – Bozana
- Semka Sokolović-Bertok – Anicina baka
- Josif Tatić – Radovan
- Anita Mančić – Nikolija
- Zoran Cvijanović – Zoran
