= Marija Karan =

Serbian actress

- Марија Каран
- Born: 29 April 1982 (age 44); Belgrade, SR Serbia, SFR Yugoslavia
- Education: Faculty of Dramatic Arts
- Alma mater: University of Arts in Belgrade
- Occupation: Actress
- Years active: 2001–present

Marija Karan (Serbian Cyrillic: Марија Каран; born 29 April 1982) is a Serbian actress. She had her film debut in Kad porastem biću Kengur and appeared after this in Jesen stiže, dunjo moja.

== Life ==
Karan was born in Belgrade. In 2007, Karan appeared alongside Nikola Kojo and Bogdan Diklić in the Serbian thriller Četvrti čovek (The fourth Man) by Dejan Zečević and alongside Branko Tomović in the British Drama Taximan by Henrik Norrthon. Marija Karan was also introduced in a FOX TV Series called Odd Mom Out.

She appeared on the December 2011 cover of Serbian Cosmopolitan magazine.

== Filmography ==
=== Television ===
Year	Title	Role
2018	Pets	Aleksandra 'Aleks'
2017	Odd Mom Out	Sommelier
2012-13	Larin izbor	Anastazija
2012	Budva na pjeni od mora	
2011	Nepobedivo srce	Slavka
2011	Covert Affairs	Nadia Levandi
2010	Dark Relic	Safa
2008	Casualty	Mina Rabinovich
2008	Jesen stiže, dunjo moja	Marija Stanimirović
2007	Ne skreći sa staze	Girl from the video
2005/6	Ljubav, navika, panika	Maja Milićević
2004	Đačka istorija srpskog filma	Herself
2003	Mile vs Tranzicija	Girl on TV

=== Films ===
Year	Title	Role
2015	Booger Red	Marija
2011	Assassination Games	October
2011	The Rite	Sandra
2010	Sevdah za Karima	Ivana
2009	Technotise: Edit & I	Broni (voice)
2008	Taximan	Dana
2007	The Fourth Man	Teodora
2007	Kradljivac uspomena	
2006	Seven and a Half	Koviljka
2006	Through Skin and Bone	Woman
2006	Ohcet	Bride
2004	Jesen stiže, dunjo moja	Marija
2004	Ulični hodač	Jana
2004	When I Grow Up, I'll Be a Kangaroo	Iris
2004	Slobodan pad	Ex-girlfriend
2003	Gotovo mitski	Mina
2002	Noć uz video	Secretary
