= Circles (film) =

2013 film

- Film poster
- Directed by: Srdan Golubović
- Written by: Melina Pota Koljević; Srđan Koljević
- Produced by: Emilie Georges; Danijel Hocevar; Boris T. Matić; Jelena Mitrović; Alexander Ris
- Starring: Aleksandar Berček
- Cinematography: Aleksandar Ilić
- Release dates: 18 January 2013 (Sundance); 23 February 2013 (Serbia)
- Running time: 112 minutes
- Country: Serbia
- Language: Serbian

Circles (Serbian: Кругови/Krugovi) is a 2013 Serbian drama film directed by Srdan Golubović. The film was selected as the Serbian entry for the Best Foreign Language Film at the 86th Academy Awards, but it was not nominated. The film won the Prize of the Ecumenical Jury at the 63rd Berlin International Film Festival and the Grand Prix, Golden Apricot at the 2013 Yerevan International Film Festival, Armenia, for Best Feature Film as well as the Grand Prix at 2013 CinEast Festival.

== Synopsis ==
The film is inspired by the true story of Bosnian Serb soldier Srđan Aleksić who died protecting Bosniak civilian Alen Glavović in January 1993 in Trebinje during the Bosnian War. Three stories take place in parallel in Belgrade, Germany, and Trebinje. Nebojša who witnessed the death of his best friend overcomes his guilty conscience to confront the killer. Haris who owes his life to the person who sacrificed for him risks everything in order to return the favour. The murderer's son meets the fallen hero's father thus opening the way to overcoming the past.

== Cast ==
- Aleksandar Berček as Ranko
- Leon Lučev as Haris
- Nebojša Glogovac as Nebojša
- Nikola Rakočević as Bogdan
- Hristina Popović as Nada
- Boris Isaković as Todor
- Vuk Kostić as Marko (Srđan Aleksić)

== See also ==
- List of submissions to the 86th Academy Awards for Best Foreign Language Film
- List of Serbian submissions for the Academy Award for Best Foreign Language Film
