= Wheels (film) =

- Directed by: Đorđe Milosavljević
- Starring: Dragan Mićanović; Anica Dobra
- Release date: 1 October 1998
- Running time: 1h 32min
- Country: Yugoslavia
- Language: Serbian

Wheels (Serbian: Точкови) is a 1998 Yugoslav black comedy film directed by Đorđe Milosavljević.

== Cast ==
- Dragan Mićanović - Nemanja
- Anica Dobra - Zana
- Ljubiša Samardžić - Vlasnik hotela
- Nikola Kojo - Korenko
- Bogdan Diklić - Coric
- Neda Arnerić - Mrs. Coric
- Svetozar Cvetković - Milan
- Milorad Mandić - Mileta
- Isidora Minić - Irena
