= The Woman with a Broken Nose =

2010 film

- Film poster
- Serbian: Žena sa slomljenim nosem
- Directed by: Srđan Koljević
- Starring: Nebojša Glogovac; Anica Dobra
- Release date: 10 June 2010
- Running time: 105 minutes
- Country: Serbia
- Language: Serbian

The Woman with a Broken Nose (Serbian: Žena sa slomljenim nosem) is a 2010 Serbian comedy film directed by Srđan Koljević.

== Cast ==
- Nebojša Glogovac as Gavrilo
- Anica Dobra as Anica
- Branka Katić as Biljana
- Jasna Žalica as Jadranka
- Nada Šargin as Jasmina
- Nikola Rakočević as Marko
- Vuk Kostić as Stefan
- Ljubomir Bandović as Taksista Rajko
- Stipe Erceg as Vuk
- Vojin Ćetković as Goran
- Bojan Dimitrijević as Pijanac iz dvorista
- Sena Đorović as Sankerka
- Rada Đuričin as Dragica
- Nikola Đuričko as Voditelj na radiju
