= Andrej Aćin =

- Born: 1972 (age 53–54); Belgrade, SR Serbia, SFR Yugoslavia
- Genres: Gothic rock; electronic music; ambiental music
- Instruments: Vocals, keyboards
- Years active: 1989-present
- Labels: Sorabia Disk, Komuna, KunstKraft
- Formerly of: BAAL
- Website: andrejacin.com

Andrej Aćin is a Serbian director, screenwriter and composer from Belgrade, currently residing in Toronto, Canada. In the 1990s, he fronted the gothic rock band BAAL, with which he released one studio album. After BAAL disbanded in 1995, Aćin released the material intended to be released on the second BAAL album under the name Retro Deux. After cooperating with the French group Noir Désir in the late 1990s, he dedicated himself to film score composing and directing short and documentary films, receiving a number of awards for his work. He graduated from the film directing department of the Belgrade Faculty of Dramatic Arts.

== Musical career ==
=== BAAL ===
Having composed ambiental music during the 1980s, Aćin founded the gothic rock band BAAL in 1989, as its keyboardist and lead vocalist, with bass guitarist Srđa Popović, guitarist Vojkan Petković, and drummer Vlada Marinković. The band released their debut album Između božanstva i ništavila (Between Divinity and Nothingness) in 1993. The album, recorded in April 1992, featured guest appearances by Mizar vocalist Goran Tanevski, on the track "Talas" ("The Wave"), Ekatarina Velika frontman Milan Mladenović, guitar on the title track, Van Gogh frontman Zvonimir Đukić, guitar on the track "Pad" ("The Fall"), and Ekatarina Velika drummer Marko Milivojević, on the track "Iščezavam" ("I Am Vanishing"). Most of the material on the album was composed by Aćin, with the exception of "Išćezavam", co-written by Aćin and Popović, and "Let" ("The Flight"), co-written by Aćin and Vladislav Jevtić. The album was co-produced by Nebojša Marić, Vlada Racković and the band members, Marić also playing guitar and Racković playing acoustic guitar on the album recording. Having released the album, the band performed regularly until 1995, when they decided to end their activity.

=== Post BAAL ===
After the disbandment of BAAL, Aćin worked on the material intended to be released on the second BAAL album. The material was released in 1996 under the name Retro Deux, on the EP Artoodeeto, featuring seven tracks. The release, produced by the dance music producer Srđan Babović, featured the lyrics in Serbian, French, and English language. Beside the vocal duties, Aćin played the keyboards and did the programming, while guest appearances featured guitarists Duda Petrović and Nebojša Marić and percussionist Aleksandar Milanović. Promotional video was recorded for the track "Run". The opening instrumental, "Waiting 1", and the closing instrumental, "Waiting 2", were originally composed for Milan Konjević's short film Waiting (For Death). In 1998, under the name Retro Deux, Aćin appeared on the hip hop band WHO Is The BEST album Play, on the track "Još jedan dim" ("Another Puff").

In early 1998, Aćin collaborated with the French group Noir Désir, performing live with them, as well as participating on the remix album One Trip, One Noise with his mixes of the tracks "Fin de siecle (G.L.Y.O)" ("End of the Century (G.L.Y.O)") and "Septembre en attendent (un jour a Belgrade)" ("September Awaits (A Day in Belgrade)").

In 2011, he moved to Toronto, and in 2017 started the band Deuxa72. The group recorded the album Years of Stolen Freedom, which remains officially unreleased until the present day.

=== Film score composing ===
In 1995, Aćin composed music for the omnibus film Package Arrangement, for the story directed by Srdan Golubović. He composed music for three Dejan Zečević's films, Buy Me an Elliot (1997), T.T. Syndrome (2002), and Little Night Music (2002). He composed music for Srđan Golubović's film Absolute 100 (2001). The music composed for T.T. Syndrome and Absolute 100 was released on official soundtrack albums. He wrote music for the film Stuff and Dough (2001) by Romanian director Cristi Puiu and for the documentary film Turning Point (2015) by Jelena Radević.

== Film directing ==
Aćin graduated from the film directing department of the Academy of Arts, Belgrade. He directed a number of short films, also writing music for three of them: The Margin (2003), The Last Moment of Eternity (2008), T.I.N.A. (2016) and Positive (2021). He directed two feature documentary films, My World Full of Lightness (2007) and Valter (2015), composing the music for the latter.

== Other activities ==
From 1992 until 1995, Aćin worked as the music editor at the Art television station. Between 2004 and 2005, he directed 88 episodes of the Serbian soap opera Jelena, and in 2006, co-directed the reality television show Transforma with Peđa Marković.

Aćin directed the theatre piece Pasija po telu (Passion by the Body), performed at the 2002 BITEF festival. He wrote music for the theater piece Silvija, directed by Milica Kralj at the Atelje 212 theatre.

In 2005, he acted in the movie Bye Bye Blackbird, directed by French director Robinson Savary.

== Awards ==
- 1995 - Golden Mimosa for the Best Original Film Soundtrack at the Herceg Novi Film Festival for the Package Arrangement soundtrack.
- 1998 - Golden Arena at the Novi Sad Film Festival for the Buy Me and Elliot soundtrack.
- 2000 - Special Mention for the Artistic Creation and Quality at the Media Dance International Festival in Paris for North West Coast.
- 2001 - Gold Award of Belgrade at the 48th Yugoslav Festival of Short and Documentary Film in Belgrade for North-West Coast.
- 2001 - Second Prize at the Balkan Youth Festival in Thessaloniki for Shopping!
- 2002 - Golden Mimosa Composer of the Year Award at the Herceg Novi Film Festival for the Absolute 100 soundtrack.
- 2002 - Gold Award of Belgrade at the 49th Yugoslav Festival of Short and Documentary Film for The World Belongs to You....
- 2003 - Special Golden Jury Award at the WorldFest-Houston International Film Festival for The Margin.
- 2016 - Platinum Award at the WorldFest-Houston International Film Festival for T.I.N.A..

== Discography ==
=== With BAAL ===
==== Studio albums ====
- Između božanstva i ništavila (1992)

=== With Retro Deux ===
==== EPs ====
- Artoodeeto (1996)

=== With Noir Désir ===
==== Studio albums ====
- One Trip, One Noise (1998)

=== Solo works ===
==== Studio albums ====
- Originalna muzika iz filma Apsolutnih sto (2001)
- T.T. Sindrom (Original Motion Picture Soundtrack) (2002)

== Filmography ==
=== Feature films ===
Year	Title	Notes
1995	Package Arrangement	Composer
1998	Buy Me an Elliot	Composer
2001	Stuff and Dough	Composer
2001	Absolute 100	Composer
2002	T.T. Syndrome	Composer
2002	Little Night Music	Composer
2005	Bye Bye Blackbird	Actor
2007	My World Full of Lightness	Writer, director
2012	Valter	Writer, composer, director
2015	Turning Point	Composer

=== Short films ===
Year	Title	Notes
1999	Memory Box	Writer, director
2000	Shopping!	Writer, director
2000	North West Coast	Director
2001	Panonian Runners	Writer, director
2001	In the Name of Friendship	Writer, director
2001	The World Belongs to You...	Writer, director
2003	The Margin	Writer, composer, director
2008	The Last Moment of Eternity	Writer, composer, director
2016	T.I.N.A.	Writer, composer, director
2021	Positive	Writer, composer, director

=== Television ===
Year	Title	Notes
2004-2005	Jelena	Director
2006	Transforma	Director
