= Anica Dobra =

Serbian film actress (born 1963)

- Аница Добра
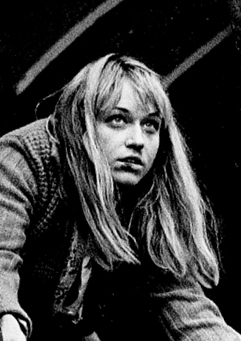
- Dobra on a film set in 1993
- Born: 3 June 1963 (age 63); Belgrade, SR Serbia, SFR Yugoslavia (now Serbia)
- Other names: Anna Dobra, Anizza Dobra, Ahnizza Dobra
- Education: Faculty of Dramatic Arts
- Occupations: Actress, singer
- Years active: 1985–present
- Awards: Bavarian Film Awards; Best Young Actress; 1990 Rosamunde

Anica Dobra (Serbian Cyrillic: Аница Добра; born 3 June 1963) is a Serbian film and theatre actress.

== Early life and education ==
Dobra was born on 3 June 1963, in Belgrade, where she completed primary education before moving to Frankfurt on Main with her mother. She stayed in Germany until she graduated from high school, and then returned to Serbia. In 1983, Dobra enrolled in the Faculty of Dramatic Arts at the University of Arts in Belgrade. She studied under Predrag Bajčetić, together with Nebojša Bakočević, Goran Radaković, Arijana Čulina, Milan Pleština and Dragana Mrkić. She graduated in 1987.

Dobra is married to Miodrag Sovtić. Their daughter Mina Sovtić is also an actress.

== Career ==
Her acting debut occurred in the second year of studies in a short film called “Pera Panker” (1985). In 1987 she got a breakthrough role in a feature film “Život radnika”. During the same year, she received the best leading actress award at the prestigious Pula Film Festival. Prominent roles in many critically acclaimed Serbian movies followed - „Već viđeno“ (1987), “Sabirni centar” (1989), “Kako je propao rokenrol” (1989), “Crni bombarder” (1992), “Točkovi” (1998), “Klopka” (2007), “Ljubav i drugi zločini” (2008), “Neko me ipak čeka” (2009), and “Enklava” (2015).

From the 1990s, Dobra appeared in over 30 international films, predominantly from German cinematography. For her first international role in “Rosamunde” (1990) she received the Bavarian Film Award for the Best Young Actress. She twice won the "Carica Teodora" award at the Film Festival in Niš.

Concurrently with her film career, Dobra has also been performing in theatre plays at Atelje 212, Zvezdara theatre and the Yugoslav drama theatre. Besides acting, she has also translated from German the folk play Der Drang by Franz Xaver Kroetz.

== Acting credits ==
=== Film ===
Year	Title	Alternative title	Role
1985	Pera Panker (short film)		
1987	Život radnika		Mirjana Ciric
1987	Već viđeno	Reflections	Olgica
1987	Život sa stricem	My Uncle's Legacy	Korina
1989	Balkan ekspres 2	Balkan Express 2	Lili
1989	Kako je propao rokenrol	The Fall of Rock & Roll	Barbara
1989	Sabirni centar	The Meeting Point	Milica
1989	Seobe II		Tekla Bozic
1990	Rosamunde		Rosamunde
1990	Nie im Leben		Mimi
1990	The Gamblers	Spieler	Kathrin
1991	Wildfire	Wildfeuer	Emerenz Meier
1992	Tito i ja	Tito and Me	majka
1992	Crni bombarder	The Black Bomber	Luna
1993	Das Grau des Himmels		Carole
1994	Polismördaren	The Police Murderer	Kia
1994	Women Are Simply Wonderful	Frauen sind was Wunderbares	Michelle
1994	Constable Zumbühl	Wachtmeister Zumbühl	Maria
1995	Roula	Roula – Dunkle Geheimnisse	Roula
1996	Honigmond		Linda
1998	Bin ich schön?	Am I Beautiful?	Franziska
1998	Točkovi	Wheels	Zana
1998	Das merkwürdige Verhalten geschlechtsreifer Großstädter zur Paarungszeit	Love Scenes from Planet Earth	Tamineh
1999	Erleuchtung garantiert	Enlightenment Guaranteed	Anica
2000	Falling Rocks		Barbara
2001	Nataša	Natasha	Sandra
2005	Ivkova slava	Ivko's Feast	Sika
2007	Klopka	The Trap	Jelena
2008	Ljubav i drugi zločini	Love and Other Crimes	Anica
2008	Universalove		Milja
2010	Žena sa slomljenim nosem	The woman with a broken nose	Anica
2013	Gde je Nadja?	Where Is Nadia?	Milena
2015	Enklava	Enclave	Milica Arsic
2016	At Eye Level	Auf Augenhöhe	Frau Gonsalves
2019	Leberkäsjunkie		Frau Grimm
2020	Fuchs im Bau	Fox in a Hole	Leyla
2021	Aleksandar od Jugoslavije	Alexander of Yugoslavia	Isidora Sekulic

=== Television ===
Year	Title	Alternative title	Role
1986	Pokondirena tikva (TV movie)		Evica
1987	Ivanov (TV movie)		Sasa
1989	Balkan ekspres 2 (TV Series)		Lili
1989	Metla bez drške (TV Series)		Pevacica
1992	5 Rooms, Kitchen, Bathroom (TV movie)		Pia Janzen
1993	Die Männer vom K3 (TV Series)		Petra Lindner
1993	Broz i ja (TV Mini Series)		majka
1995	5 Stunden Angst – Geiselnahme im Kindergarten (TV Movie)		Martina Becker
1996	Schlag 12 (TV Movie)		Gisela
1996	Wolffs Revier (TV Series)		Ines Andric
1996	Tödliche Schwesternliebe (TV Movie)		Meike
1997	Nackt im Cabrio (TV Movie)		Rosa
1997	Schimanski (TV Series)		Uta Maubach
1997	Geisterstunde – Fahrstuhl ins Jenseits (TV Movie)		Simone
1998	Frau zu sein bedarf es wenig (TV Movie)		Pauline Frohmut
1998	Weekend mit Leiche (TV Movie)		Susi / Pia
1999	Anwalt Abel (TV Series)		Fanny Götz
1999	Alphamann: Die Selbstmörderin (TV Movie)		Nadja
1999	Der Bulle von Tölz (TV Series)		Maria Burgicz
2000	Fast ein Gentleman (TV Series)		Melinda
2000	Mutter wider Willen (TV Movie)		Sonja Arnold
2001	SK Kölsch (TV Series)		Mona Liebe
2001	The Tanker	Mayday! Überfall auf hoher See	Suzanne
2001	The Publisher (TV Movie)	Der Verleger	Monika Springer: 4. Ehefrau
2001	Aszendent Liebe (TV Movie)	Love in the Ascendant	Lena Moosbach
2001	Ein Hund für alle Fälle (TV Movie)		Alexandra Kulm
2002	Der Freund meiner Mutter (TV Movie)		Katrin Weber
2002	One Hell of a Night (TV Movie)		Jana
2003	Sperling (TV Series)		Thea Caspari
2003	Tiger Eyes See Better (TV Movie)		Judith Behrens
2003	Der Herr der Wüste (TV Movie)		Annette Bucher
2003	ABC des Lebens (TV Movie)		Christiane
2004	Edel & Starck (TV Series)		Nora Wietke
2004	Das Traumhotel (TV Series)		Tina Berger
2004	Ein Baby zum Verlieben (TV Movie)		Antonia Sandmann
2004	Mogelpackung Mann (TV Movie)		Dr. Judith Müller
2005	Ivkova slava (TV Series)		Sika
2006	Die Alpenklinik (TV Movie)		Miriam Berghoff
2006	Spezialauftrag: Kindermädchen (TV Movie)	Special Mission: Nanny	Jacky Meininger
2006	Ein Familienschreck kommt selten allein (TV Movie)		Simone
2006	Ein Hauptgewinn für Papa (TV Movie)		Xenia Teschmacher
2006	Tatort (TV Series)		Susanne Paulus
2007	Another Word and I'll Marry You! (TV Movie)		Katrin Brand
2007	Die Alpenklinik: Eine Frage des Herzens (TV Movie)		Miriam Berghoff
2007	Schöne Aussicht (TV Movie)		Anna Wiegand
2008	Verrückt nach Emma (TV Movie)		Marianne Berger
2008	Die Alpenklinik: Aus heiterem Himmel (TV Movie)		Miriam Berghoff
2008	Vacation Getaway: Marrakech (TV Movie)		Jutta Basinski
2008	Mein Schüler, seine Mutter & ich (TV Movie)		Ellen Hilbig
2009	Die Alpenklinik: Riskante Entscheidung (TV Movie)		Miriam Berghoff-Guth
2009	Neko me ipak čeka (TV movie)	Someone is Still Waiting	Vanja
2010	Weihnachten im Morgenland (TV Movie)	Christmas in Arabia	Milena Makowsky
2011	Ein Sommer in Paris (TV Movie)		Klara Müller
2011	Frau Ajnstajn (TV Movie)		Mileva Maric
2011	Leipzig Homicide (TV Series)		
2012	Der Mann, der alles kann (TV Movie)		Rita Meier
2012	Geliebtes Kind (TV Movie)		Susanne
2013	SOKO 5113 (TV Series)		Candice Taylor
2013	Der Vollgasmann (TV Movie)		Claire Leonhardt
2014	Odeljenje (TV Series)		Snupijeva majka
2016	Rosamunde Pilcher (TV Series)		Ella
2016	Beste Feinde (TV Movie)		Kathi Henne
2016	Dr. Klein (TV Series)		Vera Berger
2013–2017	Otvorena vrata 2 (TV Series)		Leta
2017	SOKO Stuttgart (TV Series)		Helga Fischer
2017	Das Pubertier (TV Series)		Roksana
2018	Paviljoni (TV Movie)		
2018	Koreni (TV Series)		Roza
2019	Die Spezialisten – Im Namen der Opfer (TV Series)	Never Too Late for Justice	Inga Thalheim
2019	Neues aus Büttenwarder (TV Series)		Gerlinde Kötenbröck
2020	Der gute Bulle: Nur Tote reden nicht (TV Movie)		Esra Filipovic
2020	Slucaj porodice Boskovic (TV Series)		Danka
2021	Kralj (TV Series)		Isidora Sekulic
2021	Beleznica profesora Miskovica (TV Series)		Jelisaveta Miskovic
2021	Zwerg Nase (TV Movie)		Fee Kräuterweis
2018–2022	Ubice mog oca (TV Series)		Rada

=== Theatre ===
Play	Role	Theatre
Pred ogledalom	Liza	Atelje 212
Strah za granicu	Ingeborg Holm	Atelje 212
Boris Godunov	Marina	Atelje 212
Mravlji metež	Lepa Kata	Atelje 212
Očevi i oci	Savina	Atelje 212
Staza divljači	Hani Šnajder	Atelje 212
Divlji med	Sofija Jegorovna	Atelje 212
Gospoda Glembajevi	Barunica Castelli	Atelje 212
Mizeri	Eni	Atelje 212
Pazarni dan		Zvezdara Theatre
Čaruga		Zvezdara Theatre
Mala	Milica	Zvezdara Theatre
Urnebesna tragedija	Neven	Zvezdara Theatre
Grupa "Boris Piljnjak": Klasni neprijatelj		Zvezdara Theatre
Korešpodencija!		Zvezdara Theatre
Hipnoza jedne ljubavi		Zvezdara Theatre
Oluja	Miranda	the Yugoslav Drama Theatre

== Awards and nominations ==
Dobra is a recipient of numerous prizes. She has won Sterija's Award in 1991, the Golden Arena for Best Actress at the Pula Film Festival 1988, Carica Teodora award (twice) at the Film Festival in Niš, the Zoranov brk award, the Golden Turkey at the "Comedy Days" in Jagodina 1992, First Prize of the International Film festival in Vichy, Bavarian film - best young actress, the most prestigious German actor award Goldene Kamera, awards of Belgrade in 2008, the Award for Best Actress of SOFEST, AFUN award and others.

Year	Award	Category	Film	Result
1987	Golden Arena	Best Actress	Reflections	Won
1990	Bavarian Film Awards	Best Young Actress	Rosamunde	Won
1990	German Film Awards	Best Performance by an Actress in a Leading Role	The Gamblers	Nominated
1991	Zoran Radmilovic Award	Best Actress in a Play	Urnebesna tragedija	Won
2005	Goldene Kamera	Best German Actress	Mogelpackung Mann; Ein Baby zum Verlieben	Nominated
