= The Fourth Man (2007 film) =

- Directed by: Dejan Zečević
- Starring: Nikola Kojo; Marija Karan
- Release date: 31 October 2007
- Running time: 107 minutes
- Country: Serbia
- Language: Serbian

The Fourth Man (Четврти човек, [Četvrti čovek]) is a 2007 Serbian thriller film directed by Dejan Zečević.

== Cast ==
- Nikola Kojo - Major
- Marija Karan - Teodora
- Dragan Petrović - Inspektor
- Bogdan Diklić - Pukovnik
- Dragan Nikolić - Politicar
- Boris Milivojević - Mafijas
- Radoslav Milenković - Biznismen
- Semka Sokolović-Bertok - Komsinica
- Miloš Timotijević - Telohranitelj
- Feđa Stojanović - Inspektor Petrovic
