= T.T. Syndrome =

2002 Serbian horror film by Dejan Zečević

- DVD released by Pro Vision
- Serbian: T.T. Sindrom
- Directed by: Dejan Zečević
- Written by: Dejan Zečević
- Produced by: Milan Nikolic
- Starring: Nikola Đuričko; Ljubinka Klarić; Bane Vidaković; Dušica Žegarac; Feđa Stojanović; Sonja Damjanović; Nebojša Glogovac
- Cinematography: Vladan Obradovic
- Edited by: Srdjan Mitrovic
- Music by: Andrej Aćin
- Production companies: Revision; Tangram Entertainment
- Distributed by: Pro Vision
- Release dates: 21 March 2002 (Brussels International Fantastic Film Festival); 12 April 2002 (Federal Republic of Yugoslavia)
- Running time: 102 minutes
- Country: Federal Republic of Yugoslavia (Serbia)
- Language: Serbian

T.T. Syndrome (Serbian: Т. Т. Синдром / T. T. Sindrom) is a 2002 Serbian slasher horror film written and directed by Dejan Zečević.

== Plot ==
In 1958 a disheveled, pregnant young woman named Margita Karadzic stumbles into a public toilet, formerly a bathhouse, gives birth in one of the restrooms, and flushes the baby (the result of a rape) down a toilet. Twenty-two years later, a punk couple having sex in the bathhouse are killed and dismembered by someone, who flushes the victims' remains down a toilet before meticulously cleaning the crime scene.

Nineteen years later, Teodora, her boyfriend Vaki, and their friends Tina and Sale visit the bathhouse (where what sounds like an infant's cries and laughter frequently emanate from the plumbing) to buy drugs from a pair of dealers named Cane and Sleš. Aside from those two, the only other people in the building are an attendant, a wino, and a gay magistar named Djordjevic. While Vaki and Sale are purchasing the narcotics from Cane, someone murders both Sleš and Tina, the latter in front of a hiding Teodora. After finding Tina's body and the traumatized Teodora, everyone attempts to flee the bathhouse, the exits to which have all been sealed. Convinced that the drunk is the murderer, Cane impulsively shoots him to death; the man is afterward revealed to have been innocent when Sale discovers that his dropped camcorder had briefly recorded the real killer, who is wearing boots similar to Djordjevic's.

The men lock Djordjevic in a washroom stall and explore the bathhouse with Teodora, uncovering the attendant's body (which later vanishes) and a tunnel to the sewers in her living quarters. Vaki and Djordjevic are both murdered by the killer, who is revealed to be the attendant, who is also Margita. Convinced that the baby (called "Cloaca") that she had flushed down a toilet decades ago is somehow still alive and living in the sewers, Margita has spent years murdering visitors to the bathhouse so that she can feed her offspring their body parts by flushing them down the building's toilets. Assisting Margita are a deranged former professor named Dragi HadžiTošić (who has filled the sewers with traps for catching both people and crocodiles) and Cane, who she had abducted as a toddler and raised as her son.

As the psychotic family prepares to butcher their captives, they begin succumbing to infighting; Margita slits HadžiTošić's throat because Cane had been accidentally injured by one of his traps, and because he appeared to be attracted to Teodora, who manages to break free of her restraints and stab Margita. Teodora then releases Sale and together the two enter the sewers, pursued by Cane, who Teodora shoves into a pit where he is seemingly eaten by an entity implied to be Cloaca. Upon reaching the surface, Teodora and Sale are confronted by the wounded Margita, but are saved by a passing vagrant, who dies killing Margita (who, with her dying breath, reveals that Teodora is pregnant). The film ends with a scene of Teodora giving birth to a child who is implied to have the same disorder ("T. T. Syndrome") as Cloaca.

== Cast ==
- Sonja Damjanović as Teodora
- Nikola Đuričko as Sale
- Bane Vidaković as Cane Karadzic/Pavle Nikodijevic
- Nebojša Glogovac as Vaki
- Feđa Stojanović as Dragi HadžiTošić
- Dušica Žegarac as Margita Karadzic
- Ljubinka Klarić as Tina
- Boris Komnenić as Magistar Djordjevic
- Džemail Maksut as Merlin
- Radmila Tomović as Young Margita Karadzic
- Nenad Gvozdenović as Sleš
- Ljuba Ćipranić as Pijanac
- Mihailo Zaverla as Panker
- Suzana Ristić as Pankerka

== Reception ==
Frank Lafond of Kinoeye opined that T.T. Syndrome was "a very effective, gruesome and rather gory" film that was one of the "best surprises" of the 20th Brussels International Fantastic Film Festival. T.T. Syndrome was similarly praised by Ain't It Cool News, which called it "a landmark film" and "an outstanding establishing of a potentially great author" with a directorial-style that was comparable to both Dario Argento's and Lars von Trier's. The entertainingly "screwed up" film's style was also compared to Argento's classics by Film Threat, which wrote, "Yes, T.T. Syndrome is loud and obnoxious, and the characters are beyond dumb, but this is what makes the genre work. This feels like a period correct Giallo film in almost every single significant way."
