= Milorad Mandić =

Serbian actor

- Милорад Мандић
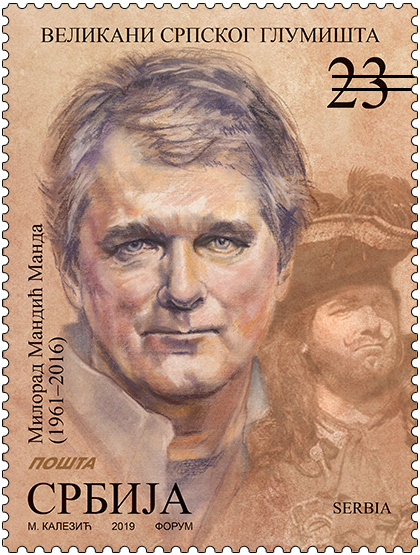
- Mandić on a 2019 Serbian stamp
- Born: 3 May 1961; Belgrade, PR Serbia, FPR Yugoslavia
- Died: 15 June 2016 (aged 55); Belgrade, Serbia
- Other name: Manda
- Occupation: Actor
- Years active: 1986–2016

Milorad Mandić Manda (Serbian Cyrillic: Милорад Мандић; 3 May 1961 – 15 June 2016) was a Serbian actor. He appeared in more than sixty films during his career.

== Biography ==
At the age of 21, he became a member of the Belgrade Amateur Experimental Drama Studio. Six years later, he graduated in acting from the Belgrade Faculty of Dramatic Arts in the class of Professor Vladimir Jevtović. After graduating, he became a member of the Belgrade Children's Theater "Boško Buha". In 1989 he recorded more than 270 episodes of the show Good Night Fairy Tale, telling good night stories that were broadcast on national television.

From 1989 to 1995, he hosted a children's show "On the Other Side of the Rainbow", which, together with Branko Kockica, made him the most popular children's actor and entertainer. From 1995 he hosted the show More Than a Game on Pink.

== Death ==
Mandić suddenly died of a heart attack onstage during a matinee performance of Peter Pan on 15 June 2016. He was playing Captain Hook. The show was cancelled.

== Selected filmography ==
Film
Year	Title	Role	Notes
2007	Klopka		
2005	Ivkova Slava		
2005	Made in YU		
2004	Goose Feather		
2004	The Red Colored Grey Truck		
2001	Absolute 100		
1998	Tri palme za dve bitange i ribicu		
1998	The Wounds		
1996	Pretty Village, Pretty Flame		
1987	Reflections		

TV
Year	Title	Role	Notes
2007–2011	Selo gori, a baba se češlja	Mile	
1987–1991	Bolji život		
1987–1988	Vuk Karadžić		
