= Srđan Koljević =

Serbian screenwriter and film director (1966–2023)

- Срђан Кољевић
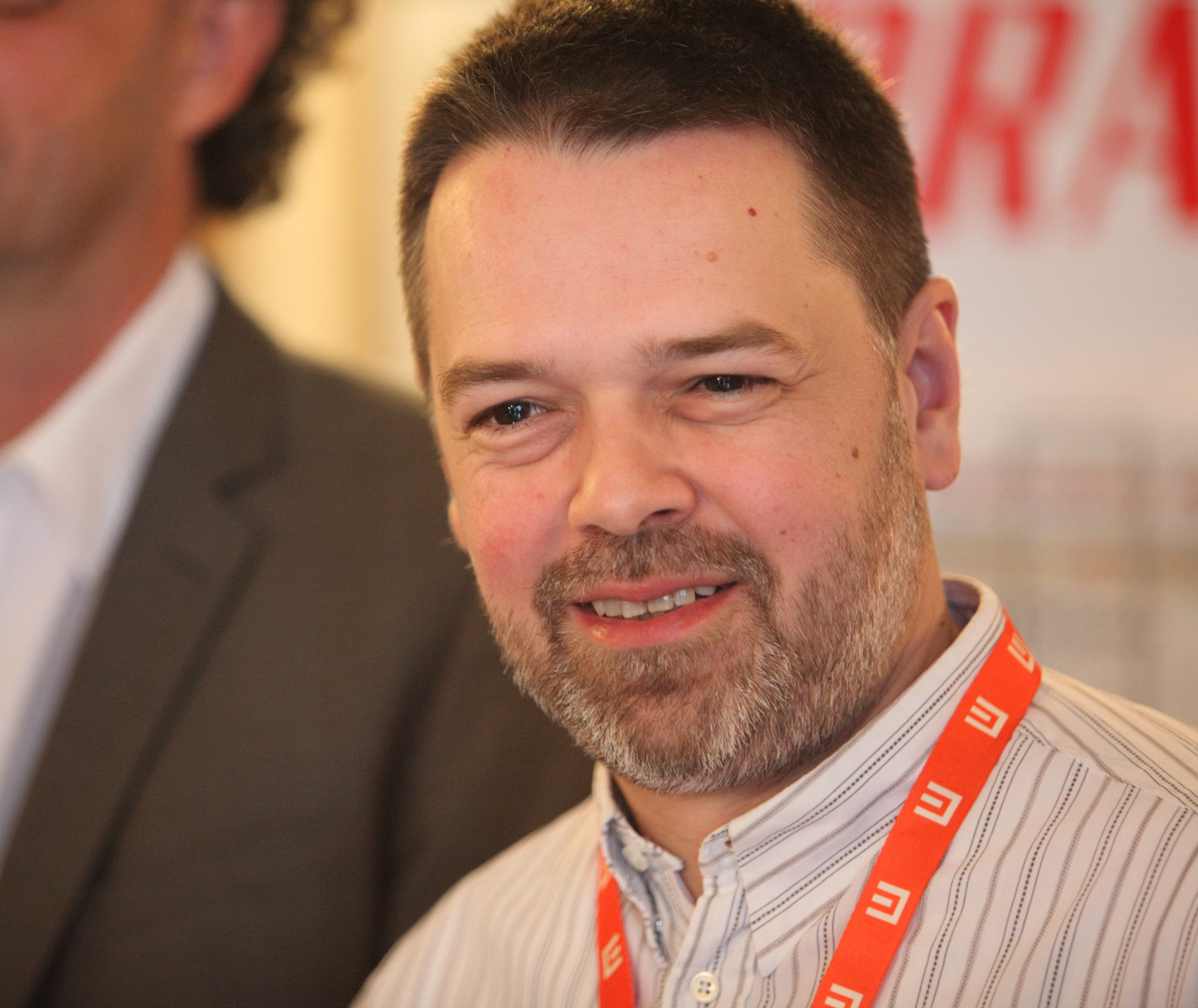
- Koljevic in 2010
- Born: 31 December 1966; Sarajevo, SR Bosnia and Herzegovina, SFR Yugoslavia
- Died: 8 July 2023 (aged 56); Belgrade, Serbia
- Occupations: Screenwriter; Film director
- Years active: 1993–2023

Srđan Koljević (31 December 1966 – 8 July 2023) was a Serbian screenwriter and film director.

Koljević died on 8 July 2023, at the age of 56.

== Selected filmography ==
Year	Film	Director	Writer	Awards / Notes
2004	The Red Colored Grey Truck	Yes	Yes	FIPRESCI Prize at Warsaw International Film Festival
2007	Klopka	No	Yes	
2010	The Woman with a Broken Nose	Yes	Yes	Golden Eye award at Zurich Film Festival
2013	Circles	No	Yes	Best Screenplay award at Festival Filmskih Scenarija - Screenfest
2014	The Man Who Defended Gavrilo Princip	Yes	Yes	Best Script award at FEST
2017	Ivan	No	Yes	Best Screenplay award at Slovene Film Festival
