= Feđa Stojanović =

Serbian actor (1948–2021)

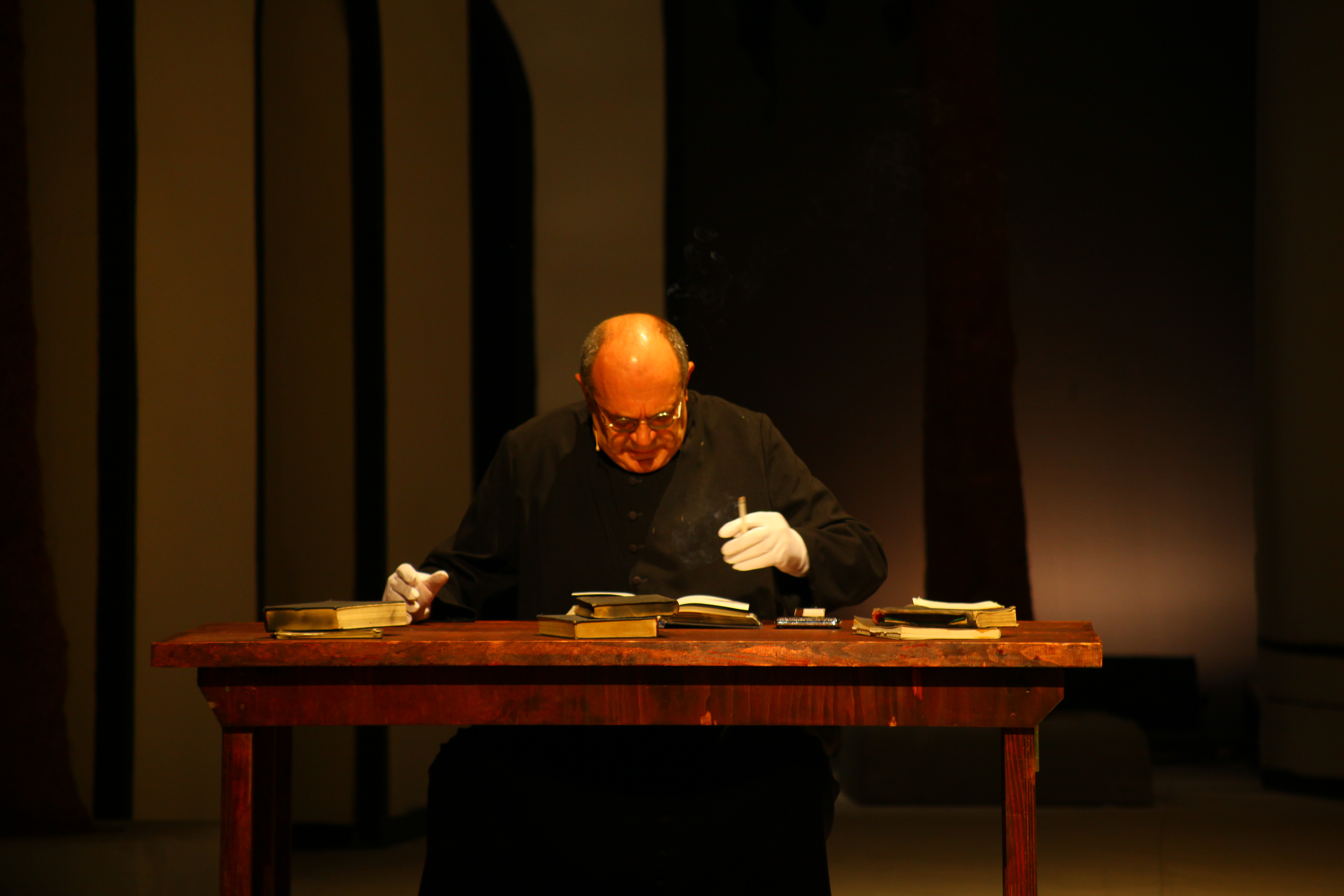
- Born: 31 January 1948; Aleksinac, Yugoslavia
- Died: 5 May 2021 (aged 73); Belgrade, Serbia
- Occupation: Actor
- Years active: 1962-2021
- Children: Zoja Stojanović; Uroš Stojanović

Feđa Stojanović (31 January 1948 – 5 May 2021) was a Serbian actor. He appeared in more than eighty films since 1962.

In 2017, Feđa Stojanović signed the Declaration on the Common Language of the Croats, Serbs, Bosniaks and Montenegrins.

== Selected filmography ==
Year	Title	Role	Notes
2008	Love and Other Crimes	Milutin	
2007	The Fourth Man	Inspektor Petrović	
2002	Little Night Music		
2002	T.T. Syndrome	Dragi HadžiTošić	
