= Stevan Sremac =

Serbian writer (1855–1906)

Stevan Sremac Стеван Сремац
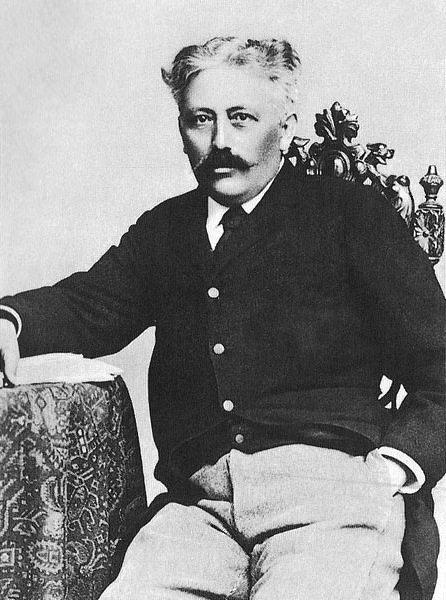
- Born: Stevan Sremac; 11 November 1855; Senta, Voivodeship of Serbia and Banat of Temeschwar, Austrian Empire
- Died: 13 August 1906 (aged 50); Sokobanja, Kingdom of Serbia
- Occupation: writer
- Writing career
- Movement: Realism

Stevan Sremac (Serbian Cyrillic: Стеван Сремац, pronounced [stɛ̌vaːn srɛ̌ːmats]; sometimes Anglicized as Strematz; 11 November 1855 – 13 August 1906) was a Serbian realist and comedy writer.

== Biography ==
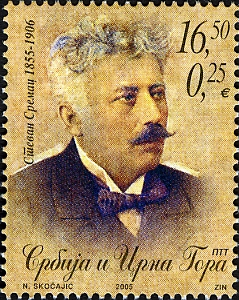
Stevan Sremac on a 2005 Serbian stamp

Stevan Sremac was born in Senta in Bačka region (then part of the Austrian Voivodeship of Serbia and Banat of Temeschwar) on 11 November 1855. Stevan Sremac had a brother, Andrija Sremac, who later became a wealthy man and lived and worked in New Jersey. He was the 1st vice-president of the Serbian National Defense Council (Srpska Narodna Odbrana).

He spent his early childhood in the city of his birth, and moved to Belgrade to study after his mother died.

While still a university student, he joined the Serbian Army and participated in the 1876 and 1877–1878 wars as a volunteer. In 1878 he graduated from Belgrade's Velika škola in philosophy and history.

He became a teacher, working in this profession for the rest of his life—in the southern Serbia's cities of Pirot, Niš and Belgrade.

In political sense, he was an activist of Liberal party (Serbia), which was pretty conservative with strong nationalist sentiments and supported the rule of the Obrenović dynasty. In 1906 he became a member of the Serbian Academy of Sciences and Arts.

Sremac died accidentally of blood poisoning in Sokobanja on 12 August 1906.

== Literary work ==
Sremac's period spent in Niš was his most productive period. During this period, he published Božićna pečenica (1893), Ivkova slava (1895), Vukadin (1903), Limunacija na selu (1896), Pop Ćira i pop Spira (1898), Čiča Jordan (1903), and Zona Zamfirova (1906).

Stevan Sremac's characters are usually small merchants, clerks, priests, artists, and just simple folk in small Serbian towns. The plots are placed in his native Vojvodina, Bačka in particular, Belgrade, and mostly, southern parts of Serbia.

== Legacy ==
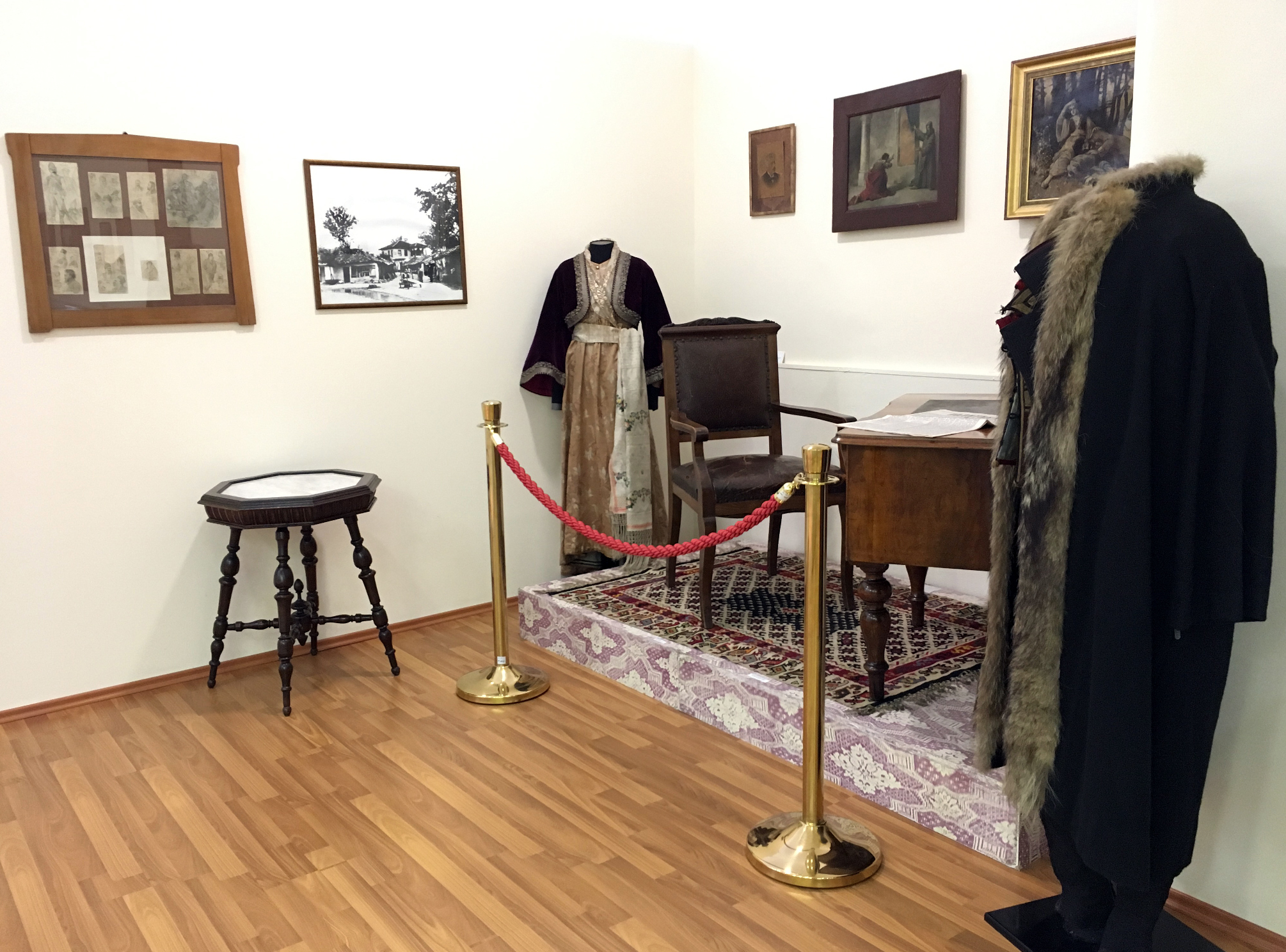
Furniture and personal belongings of Stevan Sremac and his wife in the City Museum of Niš

Many of his works were turned into films; his most popular novel Pop Ćira i pop Spira was made into TV series in 1980s, while feature films Zona Zamfirova (2002) and Ivkova slava (2005), both by director Zdravko Šotra saw huge success in Serbia and Montenegro.

He is included in The 100 most prominent Serbs.

== Selected works ==
- Božićna pečenica (Christmas Roast) (1893)
- Ivkova slava (Ivko's slava) (1895)
- Limunacija na selu (Illemonation in the Village) (1896)
- Pop Ćira i pop Spira (Priest Ćira and Priest Spira) (1898)
- Iz knjiga starostavnih (From Ancient Books) (1903—1909).
- Vukadin (1903)
- Čiča Jordan (Uncle Yordan) (1903)
- Zona Zamfirova (1906)

== See also ==
- Serbian literature
