= Đorđe Milosavljević (writer) =

Serbian film director and writer

- Ђорђе Милосављевић
- Born: 6 May 1969 (age 57); Ivanjica, SFR Yugoslavia
- Occupations: Screenwriter, writer, playwright, comics author and film director

Đorđe Milosavljević (Serbian Cyrillic: Ђорђе Милосављевић; born 6 May 1969) is a Serbian screenwriter, writer, playwright, comics author and film director.

== Biography ==
Milosavljević graduated from secondary school (gymnasium) in Kragujevac with maturity diploma, then he studied Dramaturgy at the Faculty of Dramatic Arts of Belgrade’s University of Arts and completed in 1997.

The author of numerous screenplays, theater plays and novels teaches at the Faculty of Dramatic Arts. The diverse artist is laureate of renowned prizes such as the Findling Award (2000) of Film Festival Cottbus, the Prix FIPRESCI of the Festroia International Filmfestival (2001) both for Mehanizam, the Award of Sochi International Film Festival for Točkovi (2000), the Isidora Sekulić Award (2009) for his prose Đavo i mala gospođa and the Prize FEST (2018) for best screenplay Izgrednici.

Some films (directed or written by Milosavljević) have been screened at numerous other festivals such as Busan International Film Festival 2000, Cleveland International Film Festival, Chicago International Film Festival, Flanders International Film Festival 2001, International Film Festival Rotterdam, Küstendorf Film and Music Festival, GoEast, San Sebastián International Film Festival, Thessaloniki International Film Festival, Karlovy Vary International Film Festival and Toronto International Film Festival.

== Bibliography (selection) ==
Novel

- Đavo i mala gospođa (The Devil and the Little Lady), Scatto, Belgrade 2008, ISBN 978-86-87649-12-5.
- Jagodići (Jagodić Clan), 3 Volumes, Laguna, Belgrade 2012 and 2013, ISBN 978-86-521-1035-3.
- Sentimentalne zavere (Sentimental Conspiracies), Laguna, Belgrade 2016, ISBN 978-86-521-2231-8.

Drama

- Ulični psi, (co-author Ana Lasić) based on Quentin Tarantino's Reservoir Dogs, Premiere at BITEF 1997.
- Instant seksualno vaspitanje, Premiere at Youth Theatre Novi Sad, 2005.
- Kontumac ili Berman i Jelena, Premiere at Knjaževsko-srpski teatar, 2005.
- Đavo i mala gospođa, Premiere at Knjaževsko-srpski teatar, 2011.

Comics

- L'Empire de la raison, 3 Volumes, Glénat Editions, 2005–2007, cartoonist Tiberiu Beka

== Filmography (selection) ==
Feature film

- Raškršća, co-screenwriter
- Točkovi, screenwriter and director
- Nebeska udica, co-screenwriter
- Mehanizam, director
- Apsolutnih sto, co-screenwriter
- Ringeraja, screenwriter and director
- Jesen stiže, Dunjo moja, screenwriter (2004)
- Konji vrani, screenwriter (2007)
- Bledi mesec, screenwriter (2008)
- Neprijatelj (The Enemy), screenwriter (2011)
- Ustanička ulica, co-screenwriter (2012)
- Igra u tami (Darkness), screenwriter
- Izgrednici (Offenders), screenwriter (2017)

Television film series (screenplay)

- Cvat lipe na Balkanu (2011–2012), based on the novel by Gordana Kuić
- Jagodići (Jagodić Clan; 2012–2015)
- Čizmaši (2015), based on the novel by Dragoslav Mihailović
- Vere i zavere (2016), based on the novel by Aleksandar Tišma.
- Koreni (Roots), RTS 2018.
- Preživeti Beograd (Survive Belgrade), Pink TV 2019.
- Švindleri (Swindlers), Superstar TV 2020.
