= Medal for Bravery (Serbia) =

Serbian medal for bravery

Medal for Bravery "Miloš Obilić" Медаља за храброст "Милош Обилић"

Awarded by Kingdom of Serbia Kingdom of Yugoslavia Republic of Serbia
- Type: State decoration
- Eligibility: Serbian citizens
- Awarded for: For acts in which personal courage was strongly expressed or for acts in which extraordinary courage and self-sacrifice were shown in extremely dangerous situations in saving human lives or material goods
- Status: Active

Statistics
- First induction: 1912-1918 (Kingdom of Serbia); 1918-1945 (Kingdom of Yugoslavia); 2009–present (Republic of Serbia)
- Gold medal; Silver medal; Ribbon bars of the order

The Medal for Bravery "Miloš Obilić" (Serbian: Медаља за храброст "Милош Обилић", romanized: Medalja za hrabrost "Miloš Obilić"), commonly known as the Medal of Miloš Obilić, is a state decoration awarded by the Republic of Serbia, and before that by the Kingdom of Serbia and the Kingdom of Yugoslavia, for heroic acts.

== History ==
The original Medal for Bravery was established on 14 November 1912. This medal had two degrees (gold and silver), which differed in appearance. The gold medal was worn on a red ribbon, while the silver medal was worn on a tricolor ribbon (red-blue-white, the colors of the flag of Serbia). This medal was used very briefly and was soon superseded by another model. This was because Serbia was represented by an allegorical female figure on the medal's obverse. According to some historians, the female figure was based on Serbian heroine Milica Stojadinović-Srpkinja. The female figure was considered to be an unfitting motif on the medal for bravery for the Serbian soldier. Serbian officers openly expressed dissatisfaction, after which it was decided to change the model to the one depicting Miloš Obilić.

Medal for Bravery "Miloš Obilić" was founded on 12 July 1913 by King Peter I and granted to soldiers for acts of great personal courage or for personal courage demonstrated on the battlefield. The medal was awarded in two degrees (gold and silver). It started being awarded during the Second Balkan War, continued during World War I 1914–1918, and during World War II, 1941–1945, to members of the Yugoslav Army and of Allied forces. On the obverse is the ideal figure of Miloš Obilić, the Serbian medieval knight who sacrificed his own life at the Battle of Kosovo in 1389, by assassinating the Ottoman Sultan Murad I.

The Medal for Bravery "Miloš Obilić" was worn on a red ribbon. The designer was Đorđe Jovanović.

In 2009 the National Assembly adopted a law regulating medals and continued to award the Medal for Bravery (two classes: gold and silver) and in 2010 extended its name to include "Miloš Obilić" (the Medal for Bravery "Miloš Obilić").

== Notable recipients ==
In 2012 it was posthumously awarded to Srđan Aleksić, a young Serb killed while defending his Bosniak friend.

== Gallery ==
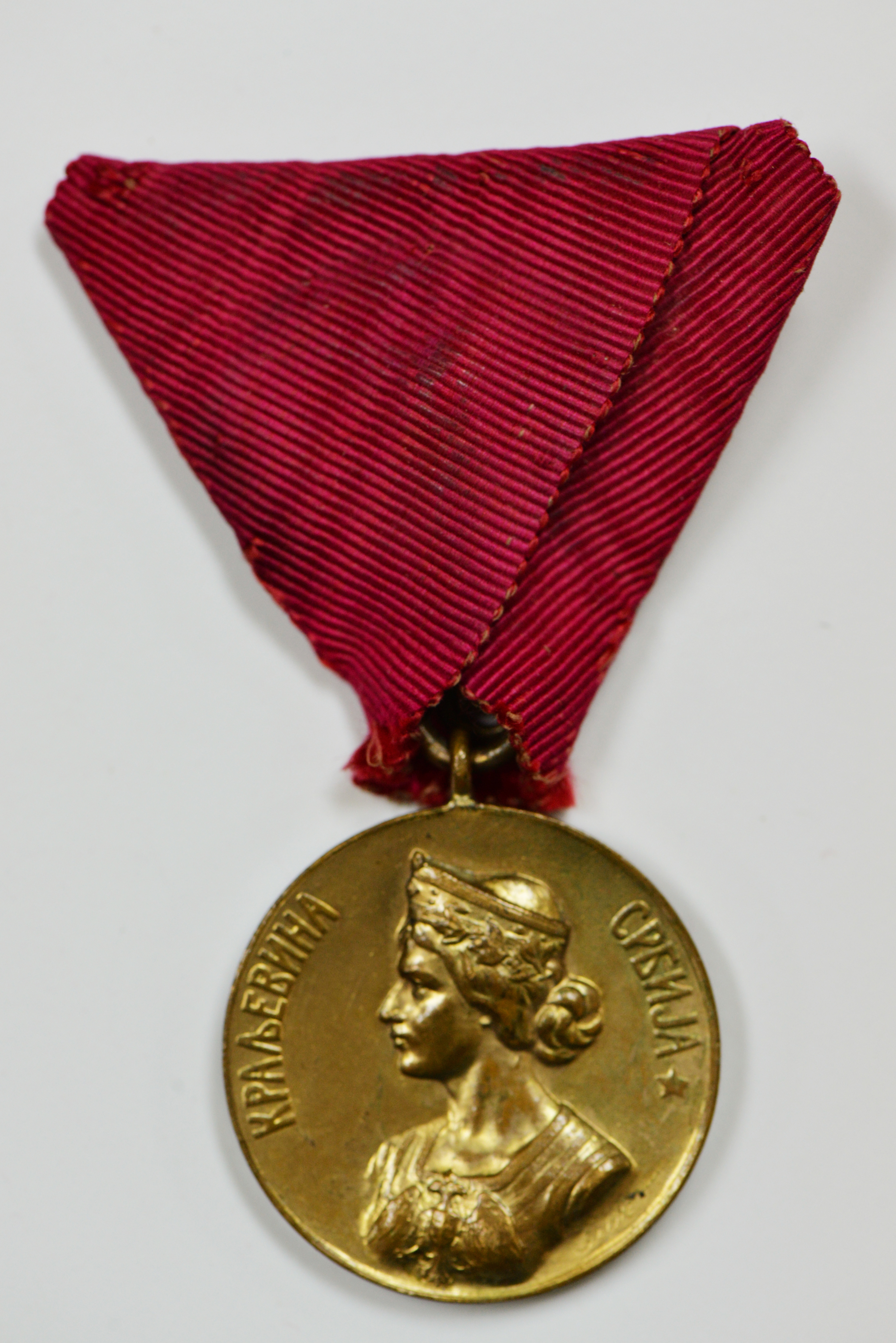
1912 version medal

== See also ==
- Orders, decorations and medals of Serbia
- Obilić Medal (Montenegro)
- Medal for Bravery (Yugoslavia)
