= Boomerang (2001 film) =

2001 film by Dragan Marinković

- Directed by: Dragan Marinković
- Starring: Lazar Ristovski; Nebojša Glogovac; Paulina Manov; Dragan Jovanović
- Release date: 20 September 2001
- Running time: 87 minutes
- Country: FR Yugoslavia
- Language: Serbian

Boomerang (Serbian: Бумеранг, romanized: Bumerang) is a 2001 Serbian comedy film directed by Dragan Marinković.

== Cast ==
- Lazar Ristovski – Bobi
- Paulina Manov – Olga
- Nebojša Glogovac – Miki
- Dragan Jovanović – Toni
- Petar Božović – Inspector Trtović
- Milena Dravić – Mrs. Jeftić
- Nikola Đuričko – Stampedo
- Zoran Cvijanović – Man who loses his watch
- Tijana Kondic – Slavica
- Vojin Ćetković – Zgodni
- Rambo Amadeus – Mutavi
- Maja Sabljić – Stanislava
- Nikola Kojo – Pavle
- Danica Ristovski – Ciganka
- Nikola Simić – Aprcović
