= The Red Colored Grey Truck =

Sivi kamion crvene boje
- Directed by: Srđan Koljević
- Written by: Srđan Koljević
- Produced by: Maksa Ćatović
- Starring: Srđan Todorović; Aleksandra Balmazović; Milorad Mandić; Dragan Bjelogrlić; Boris Milivojević; Bogdan Diklić
- Music by: Miško Plavi
- Release date: 11 August 2004
- Running time: 95 minutes
- Countries: Serbia and Montenegro
- Languages: Serbian; German; Slovenian

Sivi kamion crvene boje (Red-Colored Grey Truck) is a 2004 Serbian comedy road-movie written and directed by Srđan Koljević, starring Srđan Todorović and Aleksandra Balmazović.

== Plot ==
The story takes place in June 1991 in Yugoslavia, only a few days before the outbreak of the Yugoslav War. Ratko (Srđan Todorović), a Bosnian Serb, leaves Belgrade prison and steals a red-coloured Mercedes-Benz truck. The fact that he's (almost pathologically) passionate about stealing trucks and driving them while at the same time being colour-blind brought him to prison in the first place. Suzana (Aleksandra Balmazović), an urban Belgrade girl, discovers she is pregnant and wants to do an abortion. As her father, who believes that the emerging chaos won't last, uses their money for a speculative investment, she decides to go to Dubrovnik to earn the money for abortion. After nearly running her over while she was hitch-hiking, Ratko decides to give her a lift.

Despite the initial awkwardness and mistrust mostly due to fact that they come from different social background (Ratko coming from a rural countryside and Suzana coming from the big city), they eventually become fond of each other and fall in love.

As they travel through the Yugoslavian countryside, they find themselves in a series of situations that are sometimes humorous and sometimes life-threatening. Along the way, they encounter people from nearly every ethnic group, as well as soldiers of the Yugoslav People's Army (JNA), smugglers, gunrunners, foreign mercenaries, petty thieves, and members of illegal local militias—all seemingly waiting for the war to break out.

After witnessing that everything around them starts collapsing, they decide to change route to Yugoslav-Italian border. Ratko learns that Švabo, one of his friends, has become a weapon smuggler. He decides to visit him to get two passports and a load of weapons to bribe the local militias along their route.

When they arrive at the border, they learn that the border cross was taken over by Slovenian Territorial Defense Forces and that JNA is ordered to take it back. A tank appears and blows up Ratko's truck but the couple successfully crosses the border and settles in Italy. After some time, Suzana gives birth to a black boy and Ratko accepts him as his own son, claiming that the colors mean nothing to him.

== Awards ==
- German National Award for the Best Film of Year 2004, Mannheim-Heidelberg International Filmfestival
- Audience Award at 26th Annual Movie Festival, Monpeillet
- Special Jury Award at 2005 Sofia Film Festival
- FIPRESCI Prize at 2005 Warsaw International Film Festival
