= Absolute 100 =

2001 film by Srdan Golubović

Absolute Hundred
- Directed by: Srdan Golubović
- Written by: Srdan Golubović; Biljana Maksić; Đorđe Milosavljević
- Produced by: Miodrag Đorđević; Srdan Golubović; Ana Stanić
- Starring: Vuk Kostić; Srđan Todorović; Bogdan Diklić; Milorad Mandić; Paulina Manov; Saša Ali
- Cinematography: Aleksandar Ilić
- Edited by: Stevan Marić
- Music by: Andrej Aćin
- Distributed by: Tuck
- Release date: 6 September 2001 (FR Yugoslavia)
- Running time: 93 minutes
- Country: FR Yugoslavia
- Language: Serbian

Absolute Hundred (Serbian: Апсолутних сто, Apsolutnih sto) is a 2001 Serbian youth drama film written and directed by Srdan Golubović. It stars Vuk Kostić, Srđan Todorović, Paulina Manov and Bogdan Diklić.

In 2025, a six-episode Serbian television miniseries based on the film and directed by Golubović premiered at the Karlovy Vary International Film Festival.

== Plot summary ==
The main character Saša Gordić (Vuk Kostić) is a shooter who followed the footsteps of his older brother Igor Gordić (Srđan Todorović), a 1991 Junior European shooting gold medallist. However, Igor had to go to war in former Yugoslavia, from which he returned as a drug addict. In order to repay his debts of the local dealers, Igor is forced to sell their property, which their parents left them. So Saša decides to get revenge on everyone who destroyed his brothers life.

== Cast ==
Actor	Role
Vuk Kostić	Saša Gordić
Srđan Todorović	Igor Gordić
Bogdan Diklić	Raša Knežević
Milorad Mandić	Runda
Paulina Manov	Sanja
Saša Ali	Cvika
Dragan Petrović	Neške

== Release dates ==
Country	Release date	Notes
FR Yugoslavia	6 September 2001	
Canada	12 September 2001	Toronto International Film Festival
Greece	17 November 2001	Thessaloniki Film Festival
Netherlands	24 January 2002	Rotterdam Film Festival
Poland	10 October 2002	Warsaw Film Festival
Slovenia	12 December 2002	
Czech Republic	2 April 2005	Febio Film Festival
Hungary	2 October 2005	Pécs International Film Celebration

== Awards and nominations ==
Award	Category	Nominated	Result	Notes
Art Film Festival	Art Fiction: Best Cinematography	Aleksandar Ilić	Won	
Cottbus Film Festival	Special Award of the Ecumenical Jury	Srdan Golubović	Won	
Cottbus Film Festival	FIPRESCI Prize	Srdan Golubović	Won	
Cottbus Film Festival	Feature Film Competition Special Prize	Srdan Golubović	Won	Tied with Kruh in mleko
Paris Film Festival	Best Actor	Vuk Kostić	Won	
Paris Film Festival	Grand Prix	Srdan Golubović	Won	
Selb Film Festival	Hawk Cinematography Award	Aleksandar Ilić	Won	
Thessaloniki Film Festival	Audience Award	Srdan Golubović	Won	
Thessaloniki Film Festival	Best Actor	Vuk Kostić	Won	Tied with Alexandru Papadopol
Thessaloniki Film Festival	Golden Alexander	Srdan Golubović	Nominated	
