= The Man Who Defended Gavrilo Princip =

2014 film

- Film poster
- Serbian: Branio sam Mladu Bosnu
- Directed by: Srđan Koljević
- Starring: Nikola Rakočević; Vuk Kostić
- Release date: 14 October 2014
- Country: Serbia
- Language: Serbian

The Man Who Defended Gavrilo Princip (Serbian: Бранио сам Младу Босну / Branio sam Mladu Bosnu) is a 2014 Serbian film directed by Srđan Koljević.

The film is based on the true story of the assassination of Archduke Franz Ferdinand of Austria. The main character is Rudolf Zistler, a lawyer who defended Gavrilo Princip and the rest of the members of Young Bosnia that committed or helped committing the assassination of Archduke Franz Ferdinand of Austria, believing that it is not only right thing to do, but the single option they have left, to try and change the state of their beloved land.

== Cast ==
- Nikola Rakočević as Rudolf Zistler
- Vuk Kostić as Veljko Čubrilović
- Nebojša Glogovac as Leo Pfeffer
- Vaja Dujović as Jovanka Čubrilović
- Miloš Đurović as Gavrilo Princip
- Marko Grabež as Nedeljko Čabrinović
- Marko Pavlović as Trifko Grabež
- Boris Isaković as Prosecutor Franjo Svara
- Branislav Lečić as Ivasjuk
- Dragan Petrović as Judge Kurinaldi
- Radoslav Milenković as Malek
- Jovana Stojiljković as Jelena
