= Reflections (1987 film) =

Već viđeno (Reflections)
- Directed by: Goran Marković
- Written by: Goran Marković
- Produced by: Aleksandar Stojanović
- Starring: Mustafa Nadarević; Anica Dobra; Milorad Mandić; Petar Božović
- Cinematography: Živko Zalar
- Edited by: Snežana Ivanović
- Music by: Zoran Simjanović
- Release date: February 1987
- Running time: 102 minutes
- Country: Yugoslavia
- Languages: Serbian, some dialogue in Esperanto

Reflections (Serbo-Croatian: Već viđeno, lit. 'Already seen'; also known as Deja Vu) is a 1987 Yugoslav psychological horror/drama film directed by Goran Marković and starring Mustafa Nadarević, Anica Dobra, Milorad Mandić and Petar Božović.

The film was selected as the Yugoslav entry for the Best Foreign Language Film at the 60th Academy Awards, but was not accepted as a nominee.

== Plot ==
A mentally disturbed middle-aged musician falls in love with an attractive young girl.

Mihailo, once a brilliant young pianist, is now a piano teacher at an educational center. His colleagues consider him an oddball, but they leave him alone to live his lonely life. Everything changes when a young girl appears at his school. Contact with her, a new, erotically intense life, causes a strange phenomenon in him - as he has seen it all once before. Namely, the situations he experiences seem repeated to him. His trauma, the piano, causes painful emotions and pathological fear, a fusion of past and present, pushing him into tragedy.

== Legacy ==
The film was listed as one of the BFI's top 100 European horror films.

== See also ==
- List of submissions to the 60th Academy Awards for Best Foreign Language Film
- List of Yugoslav submissions for the Academy Award for Best Foreign Language Film
