= Klopka =

2007 film

Клопка Klopka The Trap
- Directed by: Srdan Golubović
- Written by: Melina Pota Koljević; Srđan Koljević
- Based on: Klopka by Nenad Teofilović
- Produced by: Jelena Mitrović; Natasa Ninković; Alexander Ris; Laszlo Kantor
- Starring: Nebojša Glogovac; Nataša Ninković; Miki Manojlović; Anica Dobra; Bogdan Diklić; Vuk Kostić; Vojin Ćetković
- Cinematography: Aleksandar Ilić
- Edited by: Marko Glusac; Dejan Urošević
- Music by: Mario Schneider
- Distributed by: New Yorker Video
- Release date: 12 February 2007 (Berlin)
- Running time: 106 minutes
- Country: Serbia
- Language: Serbian

Klopka (English: The Trap, Serbian: Клопка / Klopka) is a 2007 psychological thriller film directed by Srdan Golubović, based on the novel of the same name, written by Nenad Teofilović.

The film is a neo-noir piece that explores the age old question of how far a parent is willing to go to help an ailing child. Simultaneously, it also deals with the issues and challenges faced by the people living in post-Milošević Serbian society. It was selected as the Serbian entry for the Best International Feature Film at the 80th Academy Awards, make the shortlist.

== Plot ==
=== Intro ===
The film opens with Mladen Pavlović (Nebojša Glogovac), sporting bumps and bruises on his face, nervously smoking a cigarette while talking to unrevealed individual(s). Among other things, he says that he is trying to "do this one thing right, after a series of wrongs that never should have happened".

The movie occasionally returns to the scene of Mladen talking to the unseen individual(s) and discussing different details following key plot points or displaying inner torment over the unfolding story.

=== Story ===
Mladen is a young professional residing in Belgrade where he works as construction engineer in a decrepit state-owned company that's undergoing the process of privatization. He drives a beat-up Renault 4 and rents an apartment with his wife Marija (Nataša Ninković) who teaches English in a primary school. Together they're raising their only child—an 8-year-old boy named Nemanja (Marko Djurovic). Despite their limited means, they're still managing to make ends meet and provide for their son. They arrange and lead a fairly normal and happy family life—cheering Nemanja on at swim meets and taking him to the local playground where Mladen becomes acquainted with their blonde neighbour (Anica Dobra) who also brings her daughter to play there.

However, everything drastically changes one day when Nemanja is rushed to the hospital following a collapse at gym class in school. After undergoing emergency reanimation, he is diagnosed with a heart muscle condition that requires immediate surgery since the next inflammation that could come at any time might be fatal. They are further informed by Dr. Lukić (Bogdan Diklić), that the procedure is only performed at a clinic in Berlin, Germany, costs €26,000 and is not covered by domestic health insurance plans.

Faced with this shocking development and the knowledge that they have nowhere near the money that is required for the surgery, Mladen and Marija look into different ways of coming up with the funds. Mladen applies for a bank loan, but gets flatly rejected due to not owning property and being employed at a bankrupt company. Marija submits an ad in the paper, asking for charitable donations for their son's surgery. When informed about it, Mladen confronts her on the issue as he is vehemently opposed to what she did. However, suspecting misplaced ego might be the source of his ire, she simply states that it's not beneath her pride to ask for a handout in this situation. Although they quickly make up, it is obvious that the situation is starting to put a lot of strain on their marriage.

Soon, the family gets a call from a man who claims to be interested in helping Nemanja after seeing the ad, but is not willing to discuss the details over the phone so the meeting with Mladen is arranged the next day at a bar in Belgrade's Hotel Moskva. At the meeting, the dapper, well-spoken middle-aged man (played by Miki Manojlović) says he's willing to pay €30,000, explaining that that should cover Nemanja's surgery and three plane tickets to Germany. Furthermore, he says that all he wants in return is for Mladen to murder someone, seeing him as the perfect candidate to carry out the crime, because he does not have any prior record and because he is an honest, hard-working man whom no one will suspect. Counting on Mladen's dismayed initial reaction, the man tells him to think it over and says he'll contact him in two days.

Coming back home, Marija is eager to hear how the meeting went, however Mladen doesn't mention the shocking offer he received, simply dismissing the man he met with as "some nutcase". Although very much tempted, at this stage Mladen hopes that he never gets a call from him again, and in search of money even looks up an old colleague from his university days (Vojin Ćetković). The friend quickly rejects Mladen, telling him he's doesn't have the money right now.

Two days later, as he announced, the mysterious man calls from a moving car, inquiring about the decision. A torn Mladen tells him unconvincingly that it's a no-go. Sensing doubts in Mladen's voice, the man tells him to give it more thought and informs him that everything needed to carry out the murder will be in a plastic bag placed in an electrical closet underneath Branko's Bridge, and tells him to pick it up at 7am the next morning. Lying in bed that night, tormented, Mladen attempts to get some input and advice from Marija by saying he's got something important to tell her while looking ready to finally clue her in on what's going on. However, following his long-winded introduction, she decisively interrupts him, thinking he's about to go into a whiny tale of what's bothering him in general. She further tells him to concentrate on Nemanja rather than on himself.

That morning, Mladen shows up at the bridge and finds the plastic bag containing a loaded handgun, a letter with instructions and a message that promises a cash advance will be in his building mail box the next day. The letter also gives Mladen a contact name Miloš Ilić along with a PO box number. While Mladen is reading the letter in his Renault, a white BMW is seen leaving the scene.

A day later, Mladen takes Nemanja to school who's bothered by the fact that all the kids in his class saw the ad. On the way back Mladen finds €3,000 cash in his mail slot along with the intended victim's photo ID and address. The target is Petar Ivković, the owner of Mopex Trading Company. Using the instructions he's been provided about Ivković's habits, Mladen scopes out his apartment and watches him enter his Toyota Land Cruiser 100 series SUV to go to work in the morning. Along with a well dressed man, Mladen also spots a blonde woman and a little girl running to embrace Ivković - obviously his wife and daughter. Upon having a closer look, Mladen realizes that it is the blonde woman from the playground. While the little girl is the one that Nemanja plays and goes to school with. Deeply conflicted, Mladen goes to work where he takes out his frustration on the office equipment.

Soon, Nemanja has another heart episode and is rushed to the hospital once again, but this time the doctor wants him to stay for observation, repeating that the surgery needs to be done as soon as possible. The new development puts even more strain on Mladen and Marija, as they ponder their future course of action while taking turns being with Nemanja at the hospital during the day. Both realize that something needs to be done fast. Mladen is mulling over the preparations for the murder, none of which can be discussed with her, while Marija is growing impatient with what looks to her like his lack of action and answers.

Finally, late one night while Marija is at the hospital watching over Nemanja, Mladen drinks a glass of water, prepares the hand- gun, and goes out into the night. At the same time while he is waiting in front of Ivković's apartment, Nemanja gets another attack and a horrified Marija calls the nurse for help. Meanwhile, Ivković's SUV pulls up, he exits, Mladen approaches and following a short verbal exchange fires a succession of bullets at Ivković, killing him instantly. Simultaneously, Nemanja is fighting for his life as his pulse drops, but the doctors somehow manage to stabilize his condition. After the murder, a distraught Mladen is back home where he hides the gun and compulsively washes his clothes clean of powder residue. Emotionally drained, Marija also arrives home and gets very angry to see Mladen after the rough night she endured. Perplexed and completely disconnected from each other, they're barely on speaking terms. She finally implores him to say and do something in order to start dealing with this situation, but distracted and overwrought with guilt over what he did, he just tells her to move away from him. From that night they start sleeping in separate beds.

During Petar's funeral, Mladen watches the procession from a distance and sees the man who hired him giving condolences to Petar's widow Jelena. Petar's brother (played by Vuk Kostić) gives an emotional and impassioned speech vowing to find the killers and get revenge.

Mladen next wants to collect the rest of the money agreed upon after the murder, but has troubles reaching the man that had promised it to him. He also sends a letter to the contact PO box, but finds out that it doesn't even exist. Mladen realizes he was used by the man, about whom he only knows one thing: that he knew the late Ivković. To that end, Mladen starts following Ivković's widow, hoping to get some leads. However, he only finds her collapsing on a park bench while taking her daughter out to play. Mladen takes her to the hospital, and, after coming to, she tells him that she took a little more sedatives than usual and that she didn't want to kill herself despite the fact that even the doctors don't believe her. She finds comfort in talking to someone who is not from her late husband's "business" milieu. She tells him she is aware that she's receiving phony condolences from many of her late husband's friends and is convinced the murderer came from there. She also lets on that she knows her husband to have been involved in all kinds of dodgy stuff by saying that all of them knew his one side, but adds that he was the love of her life and was wonderful to her and her two daughters. Deeply conflicted and torn, Mladen is visibly troubled with the fact that he's listening and comforting the woman whose husband he just killed. While she's thanking him for all he's done for her, his conscience can't take it anymore and he excuses himself and quickly leaves.

Mladen's descent continues. Tormented by guilt and crushed by the fact he can't collect the rest of the money, he stumbles around the city drunk and gets into a fight with some arrogant youngsters, smashing the windshield of their Mercedes with a large rock. After getting beaten, he is taken to a police-station where he spends the night in custody. The next day, when questioned about the incident with the youngsters, he suddenly admits to killing Petar Ivković and tells the inspector (Milorad Mandić) every single detail of how it went down. The Inspector, however, claims to not believe a word of it and sends Mladen home while admonishing him for "wasting valuable police time on nonsense".

Mladen comes home where Marija has had just about enough of his mysterious and days-long disappearances, which she sees as his failure to deal with the situation properly and even abandonment of his family. She confronts him verbally for withdrawing inwards, calling him a "good-for-nothing weakling". In the middle of her rant, he can't take it any longer and slaps her across the face.

Later, Mladen gets a call from the man who hired him, who threatens that he will kill him and Nemanja if he keeps talking about his deed. After hearing a gypsy speaking on the other end of the phone, Mladen realizes where his antagonist is and rushes into his car and starts following the man's silver BMW. After following the man to his home, a massive compound on the outskirts of Belgrade, Mladen realizes what needs to be done. He returns to his small apartment and takes his hand-gun, loads it and heads to the compound. Mladen creeps inside and deliberately activates the BMW's security system. When the man comes outside to see why it is chirping, Mladen appears, pointing a pistol at him and asking for his money. The man confesses that he is indebted to over €500,000 and begs of Mladen to kill him, claiming that he would rather get shot in the forehead than chopped to pieces by the thugs that he is indebted to. Mladen leaves him and sits by the swimming-pool, where he gets a call from his wife, who says that somebody put € 30,000 in their bank account.

Afterwards, Mladen goes to Petar's wife and tells her that he killed her husband (this is revealed to be the scene from the beginning of the film in which he is seen speaking to an unidentified individual). He offers her the opportunity to kill him with the same gun he used to kill Petar. She declines and instructs him to leave, which Mladen does, leaving the gun behind on the table. As he leaves he sees Petar's brother approach the home with Petar's daughter, who waves to Mladen. Mladen waves back and gets in his car and stops at a red light, remaining still even once the light turns green (anticipating that Petar's widow will inform Petar's brother of the story, and that Petar's brother will make good on his vow to avenge Petar's death). Eventually a black SUV pulls up and shoots Mladen in his car (the shooter presumed to be Petar's brother). Whether Mladen is dead or just injured is left ambiguous as the film ends.

== Cast ==
- Nebojša Glogovac ... Mladen Pavlović
- Nataša Ninković ... Marija Pavlović
- Marko Đurović ... Nemanja Pavlović
- Miki Manojlović ... Kosta Antić
- Anica Dobra ... Jelena Ivković
- Bogdan Diklić ... Dr. Lukić
- Vuk Kostić ... Petar's Brother
- Vojin Ćetković ... Vlada, Mladen's friend from the university
- Dejan Čukić ... Petar Ivković
- Nebojša Ilić ... Smiling bank clerk
- Boris Isaković ... Moma
- Ivana Jovanović ... Moma's wife
- Milorad Mandić ... Inspektor
- Ana Marković ... Post office clerk
- Mladen Nelević ... Radnik

== Themes and motifs ==
Underneath its simple noir narrative, some of the movie's key points lie in spotlighting what the author sees to be the staples of post-Milošević Serbian society such as the huge gap between the rich and the poor, an entire nouveau riche class that managed to gain enormous wealth through shady means in the years since the collapse of communism, a middle class that is teetering on the edge of poverty, patriotism being used to cover up criminal activities, workers and clerks at the mercy of ruthless foreign-based businesses that negotiated their entry into the shattered Serbian economy from an overwhelming position of strength, etc.

- When Mladen applies for a loan at a foreign-owned bank, he is flatly rejected and the news is broken to him by a smiling bank employee. When asked by an angry Mladen why he is so cheerful, the clerk suddenly turns embarrassed and informs him somewhat dejectedly that the bank penalises its employees if they're not smiling while providing financial services.
- The mysterious man who offers the money for Nemanja's surgery, on condition that Mladen kill Petar Ivković, introduces himself as representing "those of us who love this country, who build and create" - a clear dig by the filmmakers at the usage of patriotism in Serbia in order to initiate and carry out criminal endeavours through state security echelons, shady businessmen, and common criminals.
- In search of the money required for son's surgery, Mladen looks up an old colleague from university days who is now doing well financially. Before rejecting Mladen, the friend sings praises of the business he's currently involved with – designing kitschy suburban palaces for the nouveau riche despite not even being an architect.
- After she puts an ad in the paper asking for donations towards Nemanja's surgery, Marija is faced with a petulant student who, after not heeding the teacher's request to put away her handheld during class, flippantly asks Marija in front of everybody to give her private English lessons. The young student's reasoning is that Marija "could use the money considering her home situation". Deeply shaken, Marija throws the student out of the class, but eventually swallows her pride and after Nemanja's third inflammation goes to the student's lavish home in order to give her private lessons in search of supplemental income or even hoping to get a loan from her rich parents, only to be shocked and sickened by the fact that the student's father owns a picture frame that costs €30,000. All of this leads to a long tirade when she comes home to Mladen that "her son's life is worth less than those people's picture frame".

== Reception ==
=== 2007 Berlinale ===
Despite being shown outside of the main program, Klopka garnered quite a buzz at the 57th Berlin International Film Festival, culminating in Hollywood Reporter including it in the list of 10 most important films of that year's festival. Variety's writer Deborah Young also wrote a positive piece.

=== Serbia ===
In its home country, Klopka's reviews were mixed. Popboks webmagazine calls it a movie whose great potential wasn't properly utilized. Its reviewer Miloš Cvetković praises the depiction of the father character's introspectiveness and emotional withdrawal following the murder, but criticizes the filmmaker's tendency to raise this family's personal drama into a general societal symbolic realm without first establishing them enough as specific people with specific individual identities. Because of that, Cvetković says, it feels like the point of no return is reached far too soon without properly exploring other options and as such feels like it wasn't the absolute last resort for the father.

The movie became the official Serbian entry for the Best Foreign Movie category at the 2008 Academy Awards. It made the shortlist of nine films, but failed to get into the final five.

=== Other festivals ===
Success at Berlinale opened the doors of various festivals across the globe. After showing at the 2008 Portland International Film Festival, the movie was reviewed by website Cinematical.

=== Critical response ===
Klopka has an approval rating of 60% on review aggregator website Rotten Tomatoes, based on 5 reviews, and an average rating of 5.1/10.

== Hollywood remake ==
Ever since its favourable showing at the 2007 Berlinale, as well as affirmative notices in The Hollywood Reporter and Variety that followed, the sale of Klopka rights to a Hollywood studio was mentioned by various press outlets. In April 2008, Hollywood production company Alcon Entertainment closely affiliated with Warner Bros. bought an option to remake the movie within 18 months of the purchase.

Finally, in early November 2008, it was announced that after buying the rights to Klopka, Alcon Entertainment gave a green light for the remake to be directed by Ericson Core based on an adapted screenplay yet to be written by Matthew Aldrich.

In September 2012 at the Toronto International Film Festival, it was announced that the film's rights had been purchased by the production company Emmett/Furla Films headed by Randall Emmett and George Furla. The movie was given the working title Fair Trade, with the producers reportedly offering the main role to Liam Neeson. The main plotline was also modified for the American audience. Warren is down on his luck and works as a limo driver, despite having a master's degree. When his son has a seizure and needs surgery, he learns that the insurance company will not cover it. With no money, a mysterious man approaches with a deal: he will pay for the child's surgery if the driver kills a mobster. Warren at first refuses, but reconsiders once he realizes his child's life depends on it.

== See also ==
- Kumbasaram, 2015 Indian remake
- List of submissions to the 80th Academy Awards for Best Foreign Language Film
- List of Serbian submissions for the Academy Award for Best International Feature Film
