= Savior (film) =

- Theatrical release poster
- Directed by: Predrag Antonijević
- Written by: Robert Orr
- Produced by: Oliver Stone; Janet Yang
- Starring: Dennis Quaid; Nastassja Kinski; Stellan Skarsgård; Nataša Ninković; Sergej Trifunović
- Cinematography: Ian Wilson
- Edited by: Ian Crafford; Gabriella Cristiani
- Music by: David Robbins
- Production company: Initial Entertainment Group
- Distributed by: Lions Gate Films
- Release date: November 20, 1998
- Running time: 103 minutes
- Country: United States
- Languages: English; Serbo-Croatian
- Budget: US$10 million

Savior is a 1998 American war film starring Dennis Quaid, Stellan Skarsgård, Nastassja Kinski, and Nataša Ninković. It is about a U.S. mercenary escorting a Bosnian Serb woman and her newborn child to a United Nations safe zone during the Bosnian War. It was produced by Oliver Stone.

== Plot ==
Joshua Rose (Dennis Quaid), a U.S. Department of State official on embassy duty in Paris, sees his wife (Nastassja Kinski) and son killed in a bombing by Islamic terrorists. Immediately after the transfer ceremony he storms into a nearby mosque and shoots several worshipers. His friend Peter (Stellan Skarsgård) is forced to shoot one of the survivors when the man tries to kill Rose, and in order to avoid arrest they join the French Foreign Legion, with Joshua taking the name Guy.

Years later, Joshua, now going by the name of "Guy", and Peter are fighting for the Bosnian Serbs in the Bosnian War. They are stationed on a bridge separating them and the Bosniaks in a town. Guy mans a sniper post overlooking the bridge, and witnesses Peter's death when Peter drops his guard at a checkpoint and a young girl throws a vegetable at him. Guy in turn shoots a boy crossing the bridge in pursuit of his runaway goat.

Guy is then seen searching the Bosniak side of the town following a ceasefire along with a Bosnian Serb soldier Goran (Sergej Trifunović). In one house they find an elderly Muslim woman who is confined to bed and shell-shocked and a dead woman. Guy also finds a sleeping baby who has been hidden in a wardrobe but does not inform Goran who hacks a finger off an old Bosniak woman in order to steal her ring.

After they leave the house, helicopters attack the town. As Goran takes cover Guy stays out in the open and returns to the house, but finds that both the child and the old lady have been killed by falling rubble. Later, Guy and Goran prepare for a prisoner exchange with the Bosnian forces. When they arrive at the exchange point one of the young Serb female prisoners being exchanged, Vera (Nataša Ninković), is visibly pregnant because she was raped by Muslims. Guy and Goran take her in Goran's car and they head towards her village.

In the car Goran berates Vera for being impregnated by a Bosniak even though Guy points out that she was almost certainly raped. Goran eventually stops the car in a tunnel. He throws Vera out of the car and begins to kick her as she lies on the ground. The blows force Vera into premature labor. As Goran prepares to murder the soon-to-be-born child, Guy kills Goran and then helps deliver the baby. When he shows Vera the child, a girl, she rejects it and attempts to shoot herself before Guy manages to stop her.

They arrive at her house where she is rejected by her family due to the shame felt by her father. They leave her house with Guy intending to head for a refugee camp where Vera and the baby would be looked after. Vera continues to reject the child and does not talk to Guy. After being told by Goran's family that his corpse has been found and that he was last seen in the company of Guy and Vera, Vera's father and brother head off in pursuit of them. They eventually catch up with them when they stop to get milk for the child. Guy is shot and injured, but Vera places herself between him and her father as he goes to kill him, and her father backs off and allows them to leave when Guy tells him that Goran intended to kill both Vera and the baby.

They briefly return to Vera's village to find it has been attacked, and have to watch from a distance as her family and other villagers are rounded up and led away by Bosniak militiamen. Guy decides to head for the safety of the UN zone in Split on the Dalmatian Coast. On their way they stop and take refuge with an elderly Croat man and his Bosnian Serb wife. The old man tells Guy "before the war, no difference [between Serbs and Croats], and now, stupid", pointing to his head to show madness.

After moving on they reach what they think is a relatively safe area. Vera leaves Guy and the child to rest in an abandoned and half-sunk boat on the edge of a lake while she goes to find a bus that will take them to Split. Vera is captured along with other civilians by members of the Croatian Defense Council (HVO). The HVO takes their prisoners to the waterfront where Guy is hiding in the boat. The HVO then proceed to beat several to death with a sledgehammer, including Vera, as they stand in the water. The fighters shoot those that are left as Guy witnesses the slaughter from inside the boat but can do nothing without giving himself and the child away. He smothers the baby in order to keep her quiet as the HVO prepares to leave. She stops breathing but is soon resuscitated by Guy.

Guy eventually makes his way onto a bus that takes him and the baby to Split where he leaves Vera's baby in an unattended Red Cross vehicle and writes the name "Vera" on a paper before walking to a pier, throwing his rifle and scope in the water and collapsing on a bench. A woman who was on the bus with him approaches him, carrying the girl and offering help. When she asks if the baby is his, Guy replies that she is and the woman promises to take them both to a hospital.

== Cast ==
- Dennis Quaid as Joshua Rose / Guy
- Nataša Ninković as Vera
- Stellan Skarsgård as Peter Dominic
- Nastassja Kinski as Maria Rose
- Sergej Trifunović as Goran
- Pascal Rollin as Paris Priest
- Catlin Foster as Christian
- John Maclaren as Colonel
- Irfan Mensur as Drill Sergeant
- Ljiljana Krstić as Old Lady
- Sanja Zogović as Girl On Bridge
- Kosta Andrejević as Boy on Bridge
- Veljko Otašević as Orthodox Priest
- Marina Bukvički as Muslim Girl
- Dušan Perković as Uncle Ratko
- Svetozar Cvetković as Croat Officer
- Josif Tatić as Croat Executioner

== Reviews ==
On review aggregation website Rotten Tomatoes, Savior currently has a 60% "Fresh" rating based on 10 reviews, with an average rating of 6.6/10. On IMDb it scores 7.2/10. Film critic Roger Ebert gave the film three and a half stars out of a possible four, stating that "Savior is a brutally honest war film that looks unblinkingly at how hate and prejudice can pose as patriotism."

== Music ==
The musical arrangements were orchestrated by David Robbins. Choral arrangements were conducted by Gil Robbins and featured the choir of Radio Television of Serbia and the Belgrade Symphony Orchestra. The film featured several traditional regional folk songs, such as Zajdi, zajdi, Uspavanka (sang as a lullaby), and Rasti, rasti, moj zeleni bore (all used as the theme and in the credits).
