= Enclave (film) =

2015 film

- Film poster
- Directed by: Goran Radovanović
- Written by: Goran Radovanović
- Produced by: Nico Hain
- Starring: Nebojsa Glogovac; Anica Dobra; Miodrag Krivokapić
- Cinematography: Axel Schneppat
- Edited by: Andrija Zafranovic
- Music by: Eleni Karaindrou; Irena Popović
- Release date: 19 March 2015
- Running time: 92 minutes
- Countries: Germany; Serbia
- Languages: Serbian; Albanian

Enclave (Serbian: Енклава / Enklava) is a 2015 drama film directed by Goran Radovanović. It was one of six films shortlisted by Serbia to be their submission for the Academy Award for Best Foreign Language Film at the 88th Academy Awards, but it was not nominated. On 3 September 2015 it was selected to represent Serbia for the Foreign Language Oscar.

The main theme of the film is life of Kosovo Serbs in small isolated ethnic enclaves.

== Plot ==
The film follows a young Serbian boy named Nenad, who was living in a ghetto that was the product of a previous war. Rather than having a linear plot line, the film focuses on the different unfortunate events in Nenad's life, sometimes revisiting past events. Specifically, the events are:

- Nenad is driven to school each day in an armoured car. This is due to the discrimination against him by everyone not living in his enclave. There is only one teacher at his school and he is also the only student. However, his teacher later leaves the war-torn place, and his school trips end.
- Nenad witnesses his grandfather die.
- Nenad gets mixed up with some bad friends. After swimming with them, his clothes fall into the river and are lost. As a result he is whipped by his father.
- A man attempts to steal Nenad's father's cattle and Nenad's father attempts to shoot him. The police arrive and arrest Nenad's father and confiscate all of his illegally owned weapons, which were kept in a box under his bed. The police offer Nenad's father a chance at employment at the police station, but he turns it down.
- Nenad's hostile friends trap him under a giant bell for refusing to play a game, and the leading boy (Baskim) pulls out a pistol and shoots the bell. This causes the bullet to ricochet and hit Baskim.
- Baskim's family questions him about who shot him. Baskim responds, "A Serb." Baskim's family and their gang set the Serbian enclave on fire, trapping Nenad under the bell tower. The heat and smoke nearly suffocates Nenad. Baskim feels guilt for trapping Nenad and revisits the bell where Nenad is trapped.
- Nenad's family decides they want a new life and end up moving to Belgrade after they free Nenad from under the bell. Nenad is not used to a school with many people and as a result he does not perform well socially.

== Cast ==
- Filip Subarić as Nenad
- Denis Murić as Baskim
- Nebojša Glogovac as Vojislav Arsic
- Anica Dobra as Milica Arsic
- Miodrag Krivokapić as Otac Draža
- Goran Radaković as Cekic
- Meto Jovanovski as Milutin Arsic
- Qun Lajçi as Baskim's grandfather
- Nenad Jezdić as bus driver

== See also ==
- List of submissions to the 88th Academy Awards for Best Foreign Language Film
- List of Serbian submissions for the Academy Award for Best Foreign Language Film
