= Hanna Schwamborn =

German actress (born 1992)

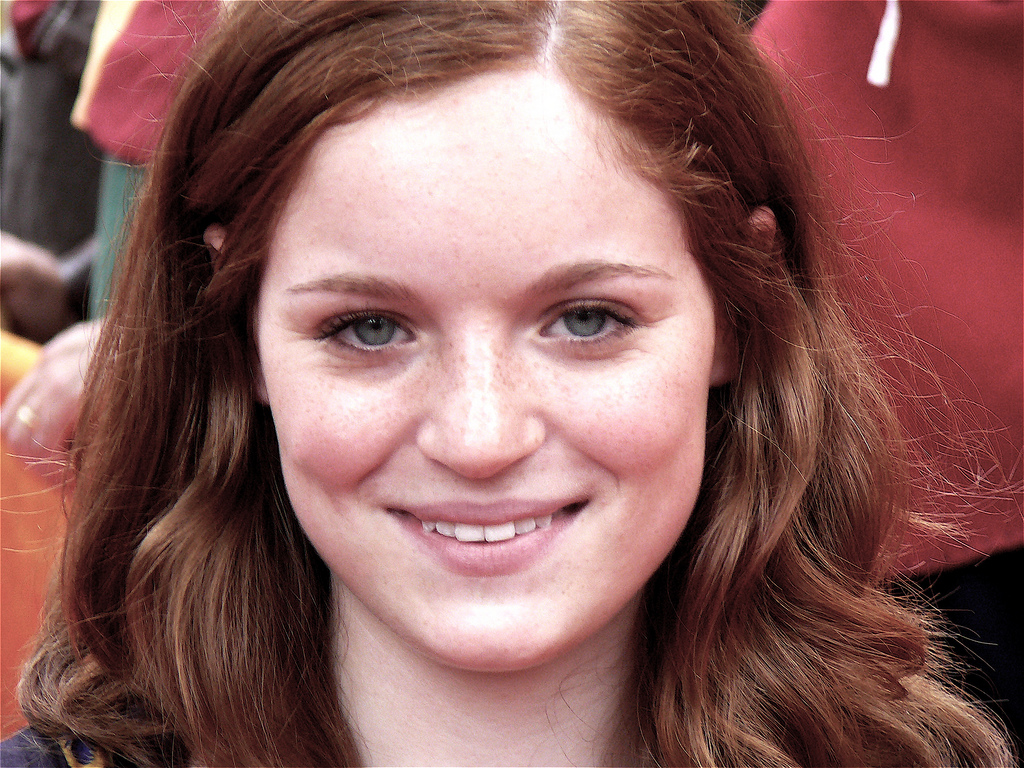
- Born: September 4, 1992 (age 33); Berlin, Germany
- Occupation: Actress
- Years active: 2003–present

Hanna Schwamborn (born September 4, 1992) is a German actress who is best known for her role as Lavinia in the Dutch film De Brief voor de Koning which is based on the book of the same name from Dutch writer Tonke Dragt.

Her first film was Good Bye, Lenin! (2003) where she plays the role of Carla, the little sister of Daniel Brühl. She has been featured in the 2008 film Ljubav i drugi zločini during the Berlinale and also in the movie Stella und der Stern des Orients.

She plays small roles in several German television. Schwamborn lives in Bremen.

== Filmography ==
Year	Title	Role
2003	Good Bye, Lenin!	Carla
2006	Tatort	Sophie Lehndorff
2007	Im Tal der wilden Rosen	Alice Greers
2007	Rosamunde Pilcher: Flügel der Hoffnung	Becky Prentiss
2007	Leipzig Homicide	Melanie Hellwig
2008	Ljubav i drugi zločini	Ivana
2008	Stella und der Stern des Orients	Clementine
2008	De Brief voor de Koning	Lavinia
2009	Ingelore	Ingelore Herz Honigstein
2010	Der Kriminalist	Franzi Wagenbach
2010	In aller Freundschaft	Jule Winkler
2010	Lys	Lys
2010	Polizeiruf 110	Mandy
2011	Der Bergdoktor	Jenni Grailing
2011	Danni Lowinski	Katharina Hackland
2011	Blissestraße	Deedee
