= Paulina Manov =

Serbian actress

- Born: 20 June 1975 (age 50); Belgrade, SR Serbia, SFR Yugoslavia
- Occupation: Actress
- Years active: 1998–present

Paulina Manov (born 20 June 1975) is a Serbian actress. She appeared in more than fifteen films since 1998.

== Selected filmography ==
Year	Title	Role	Notes
2001	Absolute 100	Sanja	
2001	Boomerang	Olga	
