= Dark Relic =

- Directed by: Lorenzo Sena
- Starring: James Frain; Clemency Burton-Hill; Tom Basden; Alyy Khan; Marija Karan; Samuel West; Christian Cooke
- Music by: Adam Paul Conway
- Country of origin: United States
- Original language: English

Production
- Producers: Jeffery Beach; Phillip J. Roth
- Cinematography: Anton Bakarski
- Editor: Matt Michael
- Running time: 88 minutes
- Budget: Universal Pictures; UFO International Productions

Original release
- Network: Syfy
- Release: 23 March 2010

Dark Relic is a 2010 fantasy horror television film directed by Lorenzo Sena and starring James Frain. The film was generally poorly received.

== Synopsis ==
In 1099 at Mount Hermon north of Jerusalem, Sir Gregory, an English knight, finds an ancient relic after a long Crusade. The relic is a piece of the cross Jesus was crucified on. He and his band of Knights then take the relic to Rome for a reward. They travel to Rome on a ship.

Their ships hits a storm and the crew are all swept overboard, the ship is blown off course and beaches on the coast. The knights abandon the ship and head inland. They find a group of civilians being defended by small band of Turks, their allies, who are being beaten in a battle. The knights' step in and defeat the attackers, and two Turks, Hasan and Safa, join their group along with the civilians, one of whom is called Rebecca. The Turks recommend a different route to Rome via land instead of across the sea.

They make camp for the night and one of the knights gets attacked by a supernatural devil and disappears. They find the knight hung up on a tree. Friar George, from the group of civilians, hypothesizes that it is the work of the devil who wants to destroy the relic. Hundreds of dead crows then drop from the sky injuring one of the knights.

Robert, one of the knights, opens the chest the relic is in as he is fascinated by it. But as soon as he opens it the group are attacked by a group of wild wolves and another one of them is killed. Robert cuts himself on the relic and his cut gets infected giving him a fever.

They find a farm where they are set upon by a plague of locusts, the knights manage to barricade themselves inside, however some civilians are killed. Gregory now starts to believe the hypothesis that the devil is trying to kill them and destroy the relic.

They arrive at a monastery, where Robert is able to rest and recover from his fever. Gregory shows the relic to the Abbot, who declares it a true relic. He informs them that the lettering on the relic is a curse which is attracting evil to them. The Monks at the monastery are infected by the curse and attack the knights, biting and scratching them. The Turks step in and aid the knights in killing the Monks. Gregory tries to destroy the relic by however the relic is unaffected by anything he does to it. Gregory and Hasan now decide they need to return to the Holy Land where the evil of the relic can be contained.

Robert's fever returns driving him mad, in his madness he attacks one of the civilians before collapsing. The knights build a stretcher to carry him. They travel through the night, when they are attacked by a flying devil like monster. Friar George quotes from the bible to stop it however it breathes fire killing him. Hasan shoots the devil with a holy arrow which drives it away. Gregory buries the relic, hoping to hide and later return with an army to kill the devil.

In the night Robert turns into a demon, growing tentacles and attacking Paul. Gregory pushes Robert off the edge of a cliff. They continue the next day. The relic emerges from the ground in front of them, causing an avalanche which kills Paul. Rebecca picks up the relic, deciding that as it is following them, they need to take it.

They come across a town that has been decimated. They find a survivor who tells them it was all the work of the devil. Another knight is infected by the devil, he attacks killing the survivor, Hasan and Safa before Gregory kills him. Now the only survivors, Gregory and Rebecca make a stand to kill the devil.

The devil attacks them in the night, Gregory duels with the devil. Rebecca fires arrows at it using a crossbow but they have no effect. Gregory then uses the relic, stabbing the devil with it. The religious effect of the relic causes the devil to explode, killing it and destroying the relic.

== Cast ==
- James Frain as Sir Gregory
- Clemency Burton-Hill as Rebecca
- Tom Basden as Robert
- Alyy Khan as Hasan
- Marija Karan as Safa
- Samuel West as Friar George
- Christian Cooke as Paul
- Atanas Srebrev as Arthur

== Reception ==
Dreadcentral gave the film a 2 and a half out of 5, Horror Asylum gave the film a 3 out of 5., Horrortalk gave the film a 2 out of 10, Letterboxd gave the film half a star out of 5., Radio Times gave the film a 2 out of 5., Starburst Magazine gave the film a 5 out of 10.
