= When I Grow Up, I'll Be a Kangaroo =

2004 film by Рadivoje Andrić

- Film poster
- Directed by: Radivoje Andrić
- Starring: Sergej Trifunović; Marija Karan Nikola Djuricko
- Release date: 25 March 2004
- Running time: 92 minutes
- Countries: Serbia and Montenegro
- Language: Serbian

When I Grow Up, I'll Be a Kangaroo (Serbian: Кад порастем бићу Кенгур, romanized: Kad porastem biću Kengur) is a 2004 Serbian comedy film directed by Radivoje Andrić, and released by Yodi Movie Craftsman.

== Cast ==
- Sergej Trifunović - Braca - A native of Voždovac. An average guy who studies film editing, Braca knows quite a lot about movies. He tries as hard as he can to win Iris' heart, but not everything goes as planned. Because of that, he starts to question all of his relationships, and ponders the fact that even though Somi, Duje, Avaks, and Hibrid have known him all his life, they actually know very little about him.
- Marija Karan - Iris - A model, who allegedly had a relationship with Brad Pitt. Later, when Braca asks her about that, it turns out that they only spoke at a fashion show, and someone made a big story out of it. Gradually, Braca grows on her, but their relationship simply wasn't meant to be.
- Nebojša Glogovac - Zivac - The short-tempered, hotheaded taxi driver who takes Iris to her date with Braca. He tends to get nervous and angry about anything and everything, especially when it comes to football matches. He is a fierce fan of Eastwich, to the point where he says, "On Kangaroo's life" whenever he swears on something.
- Boris Milivojević - Somi - Duje's best friend, and generally the more level-headed, realistic of the two. He prefers certainties to risking, as evidenced when he sold his ticket to Cile for 500 euros.
- Gordan Kičić - Sumpor - A street smart salesman and employee at a real estate agency. Even though he is academically largely uneducated, and probably didn't finish any schools whatsoever, he is quick-witted and always knows how to make a few bucks on the side.
- Nikola Vujović - Duje - Somi's best friend, and a football fanatic, even more so than his friends. He desperately wants Eastwich to win, to the point where he even went with Somi to a church and prayed for it (albeit in a quite inappropriate manner). It is revealed that he used to smoke marijuana, which is something that the Kangaroo asked about. Betting is pretty much the only thing in life he is really good at.
- Mladen Andrejević - Cile - A regular at the bar Lavovi (Lions) where the match was watched. He loves betting, watching football matches, and teasing Ljubica about her love triangle with Kangaroo and Gangula. It is revealed that he wronged Gangula in some way. How and why, however, was never revealed.
- Boris Komnenić - The doctor - The doctor is probably the only well-mannered, well-educated individual in the bar, and a friend of Cile. Also, he is the only Manchester fan in the bar, which later gets him into quite some trouble with Zivac.
- Olga Odanović - Mrs. Rada - Kangaroo's mother. Mile regards her as a special guest on the night of the match. She is very protective of her son. Even though she dislikes swearing, she swears herself whenever someone speaks ill of Kangaroo, or when he is hurt by someone during a football match.
- Lazar Strugar - Avaks - Hibrid's best friend, and a severe slacker. He has a tendency of seeing quite unbelievable events, and later no one trusts him when he wants to share. He even saw a UFO, but then when Sumpor calls journalists to announce that to the public, Avaks refuses to make a statement, because he doesn't like being famous.
- Miodrag Fisekovic - Hibrid - Just as lazy as his best friend, Hibrid is quick to pick a fight, probably because he doesn't have anything better to do. He hatches a plan to make a million dollars by suing a beer company, but the plan ultimately fails because of Sumpor.
- Milos Samolov - Burgija - A worker at the bar, known for his outlandish stories about football matches he watched, the most famous of which is the Sunderland - Leeds match, where Leeds scores three goals in the last three minutes, thus unexpectedly winning the match. Burgija refers to that event as "real football".
- Goran Daničić - Mile - The proprietor of the Lions bar. Having been in Hollywood, as evidenced by his pictures with famous Hollywood stars (which are probably his most prized possession), he developed a habit of saying something in English every once in a while when talking to others. He is quite protective of the property in the bar, especially his TV.
- Predrag Bjelac - Baron - Another regular at the Lions bar. A wheeler-dealer and petty thief, Baron usually tells far fetched, highly unlikely stories, such as the one where he met Gabriel Batistuta in a barbershop while working as a gigolo in Italy. He has a brother who likely earns for a living in the same way he does. When it comes to the Eastwich - Manchester match, Baron is the least interested person in the bar.
- Nikola Djuricko - Kangaroo - Zoran Paunovic, better known by the affectionate nickname given to him by his neighborhood friends Kangaroo, is the goalie of FC Eastwich, and is considered to be a football legend. He is by far the most skilled player in his team. As promised, he wears a, BG Rules cap during the match, much to Dule, Somi, and Cile's delight. He values his loved ones very much.
- Aleksandar Šapić - Gangula - Famous water polo player Šapić makes a special appearance as the local bully and gangster Gangula. Having already served time in prison, and with an imposing stature, he is feared by everyone (even Živac). He is in a relationship with Ljubica.
- Marko Vasović - Sone - A friend of Braca's, whose full name is Nebojša. Even though Šone is just a minor character, he delivers one of the most memorable lines from the movie. Namely, when Braca greets him by simply saying Hello, Nebojša, he replies with the iconic "Šone, brate Šone. Nebojša je malo pederski" (Šone, bro, call me Šone. 'Nebojša' is a little bit gay.).
- Ana Markovic - Ljubica The bartender in the Lions bar. She has a strained relationship with Cile, mostly because of his constant teasing and general condescending behavior towards her. The current girlfriend of Gangula, even though she still has some feelings for Kangaroo. In one scene, it was lightly implied that she might be even pregnant with Gangula.
- Boris Isaković - The cinema employee - He always demands that the rules of the cinema be strictly followed, such as demanding that Braca and Iris go sit in their assigned seats, even though the theater was completely empty. His love for alcohol and the inability to play the film force Braca to bribe him, which eventually costs him his relationship with Iris.
