= The Professional (2003 film) =

2003 film

- Directed by: Dušan Kovačević
- Written by: Dušan Kovačević
- Based on: Profesionalac; 1990 play by Dušan Kovačević
- Produced by: Dejan Vražalić; Predrag Jakovljević
- Starring: Branislav Lečić; Bora Todorović; Nataša Ninković; Dragan Jovanovic
- Cinematography: Božidar Nikolić
- Edited by: Marko Glušac
- Music by: Momčilo Bajagić
- Distributed by: Vans
- Release date: 21 May 2003
- Running time: 104 minutes
- Country: Serbia and Montenegro
- Language: Serbian

The Professional (Serbian: Професионалац / Profesionalac) is a 2003 Serbian comedy/drama film, written and directed by Dušan Kovačević and based on his 1990 play of the same name. The film enjoys cult status and is a dark comedic retrospect of the relationship between dissenters and the State Security Service under the regime of Slobodan Milošević.

It was nominated for seven awards of which it received five. It was selected as the Serbian entry for the Best Foreign Language Film at the 76th Academy Awards, but it was not nominated.

== Plot ==
In 2001, former professor of literature at Belgrade University, Teodor "Teja" Kraj is now a manager of a big publishing house. His workers are just about to go on strike, protesting against the privatization of the company, led by a man named Jovan. Teja satirically brushes off the workers' demands and continues to plan for a meal with his secretary and lover, Marta, to celebrate his 48th birthday.

A strange man shows up at Teja's office carrying a briefcase and a large suitcase and insisting to speak with him. Teja reluctantly accepts, and the man claims he is a writer, presenting Teja with four books ready to be published. He implies the books contain classified information and says they were bound in secret by his daughter. They're interrupted by Jovan, who tries to get Teja to meet with the striking workers. He gets told off by Teja for brutishly yelling at Marta, and proudly admits to beating his wife.

The mysterious man speaks with Teja about the books, collections of stories from the countryside and city life, a collection of speeches and a mysterious fourth book. Teja promises to read through the books and tries to send the man off. However, the man reveals he won't be returning, and that he's scheduled for a potentially deadly operation. He finally introduces himself as Luka Laban, a former officer of the State Security. He claims to have been following Teja for ten years, reporting on his movements on a daily basis. After Luka was retired in the aftermath of the 5 October Overthrow, his daughter compiled all his daily reports into four books, all listing Teja as the author. Luka reveals his daughter was Teja's ex-girlfriend Ana, who is now married in Canada, and wants nothing to do with her father.

The film then presents several stories of how Luka managed to either observe Teja or, on some occasions, infiltrate his circle – consisting of a fat, grumpy and drunk man named Maki, and a quirky, boastful and constantly injured man named Gipsani. In all of these situations, Teja was fighting against the Milošević regime, and Luka was right behind him monitoring his movements. On several occasions, Marta and the striking workers enter Teja's office and misunderstand his and Luka's interaction as attempted murder or sexual advances.

Luka first learned of Teja during the 9 March protests in 1991, where Teja held a speech. Luka observed Teja from a live camera. He suggested staging a car accident with Teja to his superiors but was denied. The film cuts to a scene in 1993 when Luka, posing as a newspaper salesman, was invited to sit with Teja, Maki and Gipsani at a kafana. Luka was a staunch communist at the time and loathed Teja for his anti-communist rants. When Teja narrowly avoided a fight with the other guests, he started hallucinating and left the table with talk of killing himself. Luka followed Teja to the bathroom and tried to hang Teja with his belt, making it look like a suicide, but narrowly missed his cubicle and almost hanged a different man.

Teja doubts the validity of Luka's story since Luka references high art frequently. Luka replies that he acquired an understanding of art and philosophy by following Teja, and was completely clueless about everything other than the works of Marx, Engels and Lenin beforehand. He displays knowledge of a limp Teja has since his secret car accident in 1995 and reveals he was behind the wheel. Teja threatens to kill Luka but is stopped by Marta bursting inside. Luka ran Teja over two days following the Fall of Knin in August 1995, livid with the fact that Teja had been holding an anti-government protest in spite of the refugee crisis from Croatia. His protest was unintentionally ruined by Gipsani, who insulted the crowd by sarcastically defending Milošević. At the hospital with a broken femur, Teja was visited by Luka posing as a doctor. Luka tried to provoke Teja, implying he had been working for a foreign power, and Teja bit off his ear. In the present, the two have a laugh about the ordeal.

Luka then opens his suitcase and reveals it was full of ordinary things that Teja had lost during the last ten years, mostly when he was completely drunk. Luka tells Teja stories about the lost items. On New Year's Eve 1997, Teja received a set of binoculars from Ana, Luka's daughter, which Luka later picked up. That was the day that he found out that Teja and Ana, at the time a freshman in his class, were dating. Interrupting an interrogation of a protester, arrested during the 1996–97 protests, Luka spied on the couple in a strip club wearing a Santa Claus mask. At the strip club, Luka suffered a stroke and was hospitalized. At the hospital, he revealed to Ana that he had been following her relationship, and her attempt to secure a Canadian visa. There, he promised to Ana that he wouldn't murder Teja.

He later followed and photographed Teja and Ana, and forwarded the photographs to Teja's university. Teja was kicked out for sexual misconduct and Ana suffered a nervous breakdown and dropped out. Luka became an alcoholic during this period. Luka suggests that he still considers it was worth it. Teja again threatens to kill Luka and is again stopped by Marta, who bursts in to inform Teja that the striking workers have blocked the street. While Teja steps out to confront the workers, we see Luka check on a recording device planted in Teja's office and contemplate turning it off. When Teja returns, Luka reveals he had been following Teja following his dismissal from the university and collecting his lost mail, particularly from his parents in Šid. Luka even visited Teja's parents, posing as a friend from the police academy of Teja's father's. We learn Teja's parents felt abandoned and lonely, as Teja never visited them.

Luka shows him a toy dog that Teja got for his son when he visited his ex-wife in a bomb shelter during the NATO bombing of Yugoslavia. Luka had already visited her and had shown her the photographs of Teja with Ana, making her leave Teja for good. Teja was being comforted in a kafana by Maki and Gipsani when he first met Marta who was sitting with her psychotic boyfriend. The boyfriend threatened Teja and his friends with a gun for exchanging looks with Marta. Marta secretly observes Teja and Luka reminisce over these memories, but is interrupted by Jovan, demanding Teja speak to the workers. Teja bursts into the room and knocks Marta over with the door. Thinking Jovan assaulted her, he punches Jovan in the face and tends to Marta. Jovan threatens him with a gun, and he is saved by Luka. It is revealed that Jovan is a State Security operative tasked with rousing trade unions under the code name Trotsky, and Luka uses his authority to call off the strike. Luka and Teja discuss how the murder would be portrayed as a suicide or a crime of passion, had Jovan killed Marta and him, and how the State Security was never really reformed as only Luka was sacked.

Luka then tells Teja that this was, in reality, the second time he saved Teja's life. The first time was following his father's funeral when Teja and his friends grieved all night in a kafana with a hunters' club Luka had infiltrated. Teja drank all night and paid the band with his father's golden ring, which Luka returns to him in the present. On the train ride back home, Luka was in Teja and his friends' compartment with a fake mustache posing as a sympathetic conductor. Teja suddenly left the compartment to look for a toilet, and accidentally fell out of the moving train. Luka stopped the train and jumped out to save him, but the train left without them. Luka then carried an unconscious Teja back to safety, fearing Ana would think he killed him if Teja accidentally died.

Luka reveals he is now working as a cab driver, and just wanted Teja to have the four books he brought and a play Teja "wrote", referring to a voice recorder Luka brought in his purse. Teja asks if Luka needed anything, and Luka presents him Ana's phone number in Canada and begs him to tell her they departed as friends. In the director's cut, we see the two were being watched by the State Security all along.

== Cast ==
- Branislav Lečić as Teodor "Teja" Kraj
- Bora Todorović as Luka Laban
- Nataša Ninković as Marta
- Dragan Jovanović as Gipsani
- Josif Tatić as Maki
- Miodrag Krstović as Jovan
- Gorica Popović as a journalist
- Renata Ulmanski as Teja's mother
- Stole Novaković as Teja's father
- Dana Todorović as Ana
- Aljoša Vučković as a waiter
- Sergej Trifunović as Marta's violent ex-boyfriend

Branislav Lečić was intentionally chosen to play the role of Teodor "Teja" Kraj because he actively participated in overthrowing the Milošević regime. Actual footage from the 1991 protests showing Lečić giving his speech was used in the film.

== Differences from the play ==
The film is a somewhat modernized version of the 1990 play. Most of the events the two main characters discuss in the play take place during the 1970's and 80's, and the earliest events described in the film take place in 1991.

The entire subplot concerning the relationship between Luka's daughter and Teja is added in the film, in the play Luka has a son who is merely Teja's acquaintance. Another major point is the strike action subplot, the character of Jovan was added in the film and is based on the character of a raging writer barging into Teja's office after being declined by the publishing company. The relationship between Teja and Marta is more explicit in the film adaptation.

== Reception ==
The Professional was submitted in 2004 to the 76th Academy Awards for Best Foreign Language Film, but wasn't nominated.

Year	Festival	Award
2003	Montréal World Film Festival	Best Screenplay
2003	Montréal World Film Festival	FIPRESCI Prize
2003	Viareggio Europa Cinema	Best Film
2003	Viareggio Europa Cinema	Best Screenplay
2004	Istanbul International Film Festival	Special Prize of the Jury

== See also ==
- List of submissions to the 76th Academy Awards for Best Foreign Language Film
- List of Serbian submissions for the Academy Award for Best Foreign Language Film
