= Ivko's Feast =

2005 film

Ivkova Slava
- Directed by: Zdravko Šotra
- Written by: Stevan Sremac (novel)
- Starring: Zoran Cvijanović; Nataša Ninković; Srđan Todorović; Nikola Đuričko; Anica Dobra
- Music by: Željko Joksimović
- Release date: 2005
- Running time: 110 minutes
- Language: Serbian

Ivkova Slava (Serbian Cyrillic: Ивкова слава) is a 2005 Serbian film by Zdravko Šotra. It is based on the 1895 book by Serbian author Stevan Sremac. The film is in Serbian. The film was a smash hit in Serbia and Montenegro.

== Plot ==
Ivkova Slava is set in the southern Serbian city of Niš in the 19th century, after the liberation and immediately after the establishment of the railway line Belgrade - Nis. This movie is about Ivko, a man, who celebrates Đurđevdan with people across the city.

== Cast ==
- Zoran Cvijanović as Ivko
- Nataša Ninković as Paraskeva
- Srđan Todorović as Smuk
- Nikola Đuričko as Svetislav
- Anica Dobra as Sika
