= Soldier's Lullaby =

2018 film

- Directed by: Predrag Antonijević
- Starring: Marko Vasiljević; Vuk Jovanović
- Release date: 21 September 2018
- Running time: 2h
- Country: Serbia
- Language: Serbian

Soldier's Lullaby (Serbian: Заспанка за војнике) is a 2018 Serbian drama film directed by Predrag Antonijević.
