= Predrag Antonijević =

Serbian film director

- Предраг Антонијевић
- Born: 7 February 1959 (age 67); Niš, PR Serbia, Yugoslavia
- Occupations: Film director Screenwriter
- Years active: 1981–present

Predrag "Gaga" Antonijević (Serbian Cyrillic: Предраг Гага Антонијевић; born 7 February 1959) is a Serbian film director and screenwriter. In 2021, he was awarded the Order of Karađorđe's Star.

== Filmography ==
Year	Film	Director	Writer	Awards / Notes
1983	O pokojniku sve najlepse	Yes	Yes	UNICEF Award at Venice Film Festival
1984	Kako se kalio narod Gornjeg Jaukovca	Yes	Yes	
1989	Balkan ekspres 2	Yes	No	
1991	Mala	Yes	No	
1998	Savior	Yes	No	PFS award at Political Film Society
2002	Hard Cash	Yes	No	
2011	Little Murder	Yes	No	
2013	Breaking at the Edge	Yes	No	
2018	Soldier's Lullaby	Yes	Yes	
2021	Dara of Jasenovac	Yes	Yes	

TV works

Year	Film	Director	Writer	Producer	Awards / Notes
1988	Balkan ekspres 2	Yes	Yes	No	TV series
2017–2019	Ubice mog oca	Yes	Yes	Yes	
2019–2020	Državni službenik	Yes	Yes	Yes	
2021	Pevačica	No	Yes	No	TBR
