= Nataša Ninković =

Serbian actress

- Наташа Нинковић
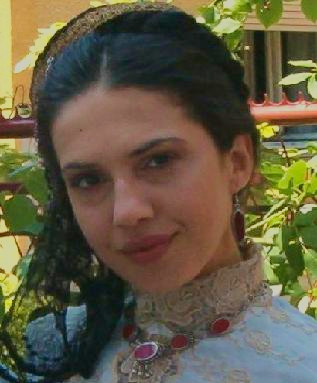
- Nataša Ninković 2005.
- Born: 22 July 1972 (age 54); Trebinje, SR Bosnia and Herzegovina, SFR Yugoslavia
- Education: Faculty of Dramatic Arts
- Occupation: Actress
- Years active: 1989–present
- Spouse: Nenad Šarenac
- Children: 2

Nataša Ninković (Serbian Cyrillic: Наташа Нинковић; born 22 July 1972) is a Serbian actress, best known for her roles in the films Savior, War Live, The Professional and The Trap.

== Personal life ==
Ninković was born on 22 July 1972 in Trebinje (SFR Yugoslavia then, Bosnia and Herzegovina now) to father Branko and mother Milena. She finished her primary and secondary school in Trebinje. In 1994, Ninković graduated from the Faculty of Drama Arts at the University of Belgrade, along with actors Vojin Ćetković, Sergej Trifunović and Nebojša Glogovac.

Ninković is married to Nenad Šarenac, with whom she has twins Luka and Matija Šarenac.

== Filmography ==
| Title | Original Title | Year | Role | Notes |
|---|---|---|---|---|
| The Best | Najbolji | 1989 | Waitress | |
| Three Tickets for Hollywood | Tri karte za Holivud | 1993 | Lucija | |
| The Pharmacy of Golubović | Golubovića apoteka | 1998 | Jelena | TV film |
| Prince Michael | Knez Mihajlo | 1998 | | TV film |
| Savior | | 1998 | Vera | |
| The Family's Treasure | Porodično blago | 1998 | Ružica "Ruška" Ranković | TV series; 1998–2001 |
| War Live | Rat uživo | 2001 | Lola | |
| The Serbian Dane | Den serbiske dansker | 2001 | Ema | TV film |
| Master | Majstor | 2001 | | TV film |
| Ilka | | 2003 | Jelena "Ilka" Marković | TV film |
| The Professional | Profesionalac | 2003 | Marta | |
| Mixed Marriage | M(j)ešoviti brak | 2004 | Lola | TV series; 1 episode |
| I Have Something Important to Tell You | Imam nešto važno da ti kažem | 2005 | Mother | |
| Ivko's Feast | Ivkova slava | 2005 | Paraskeva | |
| Made in YU | | 2005 | Marija | |
| Ideal Relationships | Idealne veze | 2005 | Tamara | TV series |
| Love, Habit, Panic | Ljubav, navika, panika | 2006 | Božana | TV series; 1 episode |
| The Trap | Klopka | 2007 | Marija | |
| The Street of Lindens | Ulica lipa | 2007 | Saška | TV series; 2007–09 |
| Region St. 2 | Pokrajina St. 2 | 2008 | Ružica | |
| Wounded Eagle | Ranjeni orao | 2008 | Vukica | TV series; 2008–09 |
| Bitter Fruit | Gorki plodovi | 2008 | Anita | TV series; 2008–09 |
| The Ambulance | | 2009 | | |
| Some Other Stories | | 2010 | Milena | |
| Unbeatable Heart | Nepobedivo srce | 2011 | Kaća Stajić | TV series |
| The Blossom of Linden in the Balkans | Cvat lipe na Balkanu | 2011 | Riki Salom | TV series |
| The Death of Man in the Balkans | Smrt čoveka na Balkanu | 2012 | Nada | |
| Dara in Jasenovac | Dara iz Jasenovca | 2020 | | |
| No Fairy Dust | Pukotina u ledu | 2026 | Suzana | Midnight Screenings at the 32nd Sarajevo Film Festival |

== Awards and nominations ==
| Award | Year | Category | Nominated work | Result |
|---|---|---|---|---|
| Belgrade Drama Theatre Annual Awards | 2005 | Best Actress | Transilvania | Won |
| Days of Comedy Festival | 2002 | Golden Turkey | A Midsummer Night's Dream | Won |
| Milivoje Živanović Festival | 2003 | Audience Award | Liar and Paraliar | Won |
| National Theatre in Belgrade Annual Awards | 2001 | Best Actress | Master | Won |
| National Theatre in Belgrade Annual Awards | 2002 | Best Actress | A Midsummer Night's Dream | Won |
| National Theatre in Belgrade Annual Awards | 2010 | Best Actress | Hedda Gabler | Won |
| Niš International Film Festival | 1998 | Best Actress | Savior | Won |
| Niš International Film Festival | 1998 | Audience Award | Savior | Won |
| Niš International Film Festival | 2003 | Best Actress | The Professional | Won |
| Niš International Film Festival | 2007 | Best Actress | The Trap | Won |
| Sochi International Film Festival | 1998 | Best Actress | Savior | Won |
| The Days of Nušić Festival | 2003 | Best Acting Achievement | Liar and Paraliar | Won |
| The Theatre Days of Bora Festival | 2003 | Acting Award | Tre sorelle | Won |
| Valencienne Film Festival | 1998 | Best Actress | Savior | Won |
