= Rudolf Zistler =

Austro-Hungarian socialist and lawyer

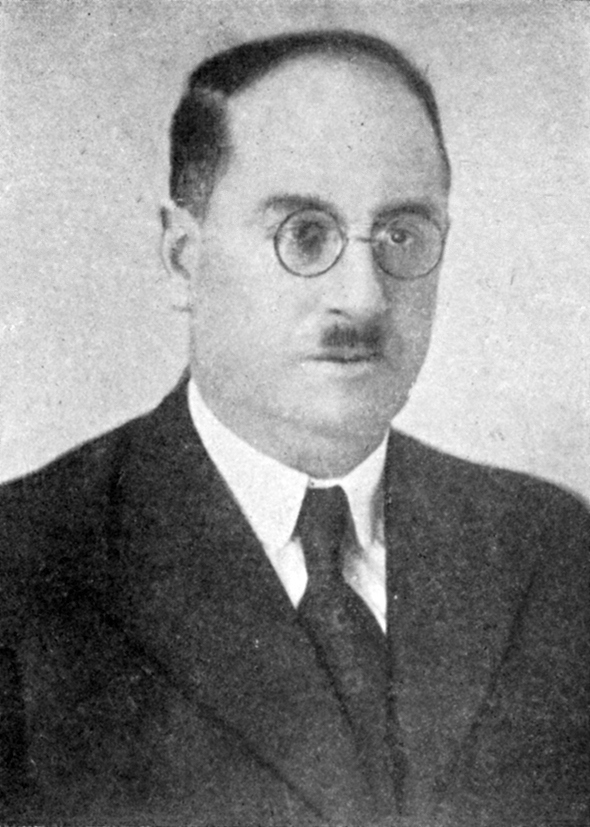
- Born: 1886; Zagreb, Austria-Hungary (now Croatia)
- Died: 1960 (aged 73–74)
- Occupation: lawyer
- Known for: defending Gavrilo Princip and other members of Young Bosnia

Rudolf Zistler (or Cistler; 1886–1960) was an Austro-Hungarian socialist and lawyer, most known for having defended members of Young Bosnia on trial for the assassination of Archduke Franz Ferdinand of Austria.

Zistler moved to Sarajevo before the start of World War I. His daughter Vanda Zistler became a prominent opera singer at the Sarajevo Opera, and had a "clear, powerful voice".

In 1937, Rudolf Zistler published a book about his experiences, titled Kako sam branio Principa i drugove (How I came to defend Princip and the others).

A movie has been made about him: The Man Who Defended Gavrilo Princip (2014).
