= Srdan Golubović =

Serbian film director

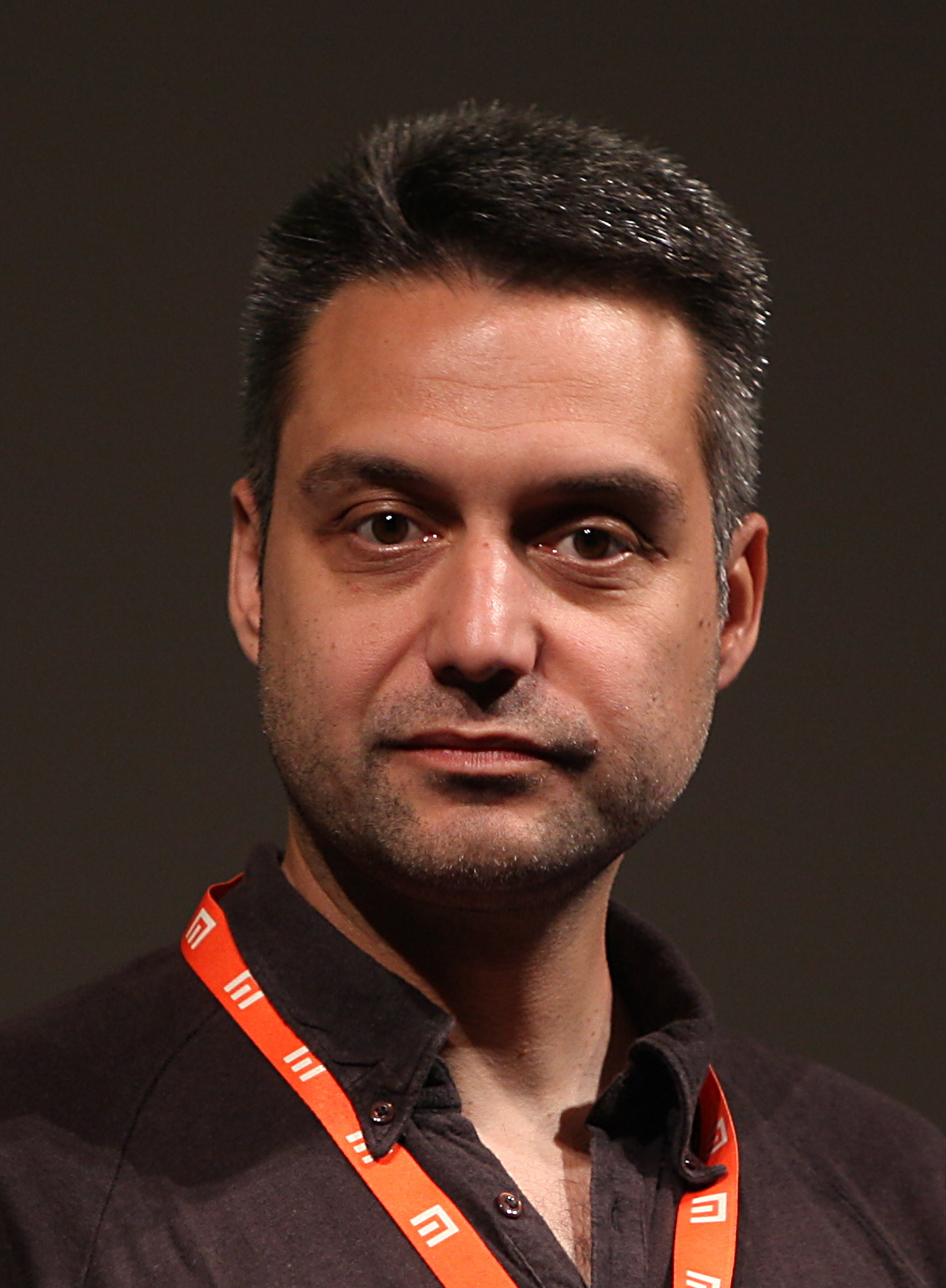
- Srdan Golubović in 2010
- Born: August 24, 1972 (age 53); Belgrade, SR Serbia, SFR Yugoslavia
- Occupation: Director
- Years active: 1993–present
- Known for: Absolute 100, Klopka, Circles

Srdan Golubović (Serbian Cyrillic: Срдан Голубовић; born August 24, 1972) is a Serbian film director and university professor.

== Biography ==
Golubović's father was a film director Predrag Golubović. His first feature film Absolute 100 participated in main programs of over thirty international film festivals, including Cottbus, Rotterdam, Thessaloniki, Toronto and San Sebastian, winning 10 international and 19 domestic awards. His second feature film Klopka ("The Trap") had its world premiere at the Berlinale in 2007. The film has won a total of 21 international awards and was shortlisted for the Oscar in Best Foreign Language Film category.

Along with a team of young film artists, Golubović is the main vehicle behind the production company Baš Celik, making music videos for a number of established local music artists, as well as commercials and marketing campaigns.

He is an assistant professor of Film Directing at The Faculty of Dramatic Arts in Belgrade.

His 2013 film Circles has been selected as the Serbian entry for the Best Foreign Language Film at the 86th Academy Awards.

== Awards ==
International awards: Thessaloniki Film Festival (Audience Award for The Best Foreign Film, Best Actor Award), Shaken's Stars, Cottbus Film Festival, Festival Du Film De Paris (Best Actor), Grenzland Filmtage, Teplice Film Festival (Golden Key For Best Cinematography), Palic International Film Festival (Silver Tower For the Best Film).

== Filmography ==
Year	Film	Director	Writer	Awards / Notes
2001	Absolute 100	Yes	Yes	Grand Prix at Festival du Film de Paris
2007	Klopka	Yes	No	Grand Prix at Sofia International Film Festival
2013	Circles	Yes	No	Golden Apricot at Yerevan International Film Festival, Audience award at Sarajevo Film Festival
2020	Father	Yes	Yes	Panorama Audience Award at Berlin International Film Festival
