= Dejan Zečević =

Serbian film director and screenwriter (born 1972)

- Born: 1972; Belgrade, Serbia
- Occupation(s): Film director and screenwriter
- Years active: 1992 - present

Dejan Zečević (born 1972) is a Serbian film director and screenwriter. He graduated top of his class in film and TV directing from the Faculty of Dramatic Arts in Belgrade. In 2022, he won the "Bela Lugosi Award" for outstanding contribution to the art of horror.

== Filmography as director ==
- Paket aranžman (Noć bez sna) (1995)
- Dečak iz Junkovca (1995)
- Kupi mi Eliota (1998)
- T.T. Sindrom (2002)
- Mala noćna muzika (2002)
- Prekidamo program (2002) (TV)
- Dobre namere (2003) (TV)
- Mentol bombona (2004) (TV series)
- Košarkaši (2005) (TV series)
- The Fourth Man (2007)
- The Enemy (2011)
- Offenders (2017)
