= Vuk Kostić =

Serbian actor

- Вук Костић
- Born: Vuk Kostić; 22 November 1979 (age 46); Belgrade, SR Serbia, SFR Yugoslavia
- Occupation: Actor
- Years active: 1986–present
- Awards: Thessaloniki Film Festival; Best Actor; 2001 Apsolutnih 100; Festival du Film de Paris; Best Actor; 2002 Apsolutnih 100

Vuk Kostić (Serbian Cyrillic: Вук Костић; born 22 November 1979) is a Serbian actor. He is famous for his roles in movies Apsolutnih 100, Stvar srca, Ubice mog oca, and Klopka.

== Private life ==
He is the son of actor Mihajlo Kostić and Gordana.

== Selected filmography ==
Film
Year	Title	Role	Notes
2001	Apsolutnih 100	Saša Gordić	
2004	Life is a Miracle	Mitar	
2007	Klopka	Petar's Brother	
2014	The Man Who Defended Gavrilo Princip	Veljko Čubrilović	
2021	Dara of Jasenovac	Miroslav Filipović	

Television
Year	Title	Role	Notes
2008-2015	Ulica lipa	Ladni	
2020	Južni Vetar	Sparta	

== Awards ==
- Thessaloniki Film Festival
  - 2001: Best Actor (Apsolutnih 100) — Won
- Festival du Film de Paris
  - 2002: Best Actor (Apsolutnih 100) — Won
