= Nikola Dragutinović =

Serbian actor (born 1991)

- Никола Драгутиновић
- Born: 22 April 1991 (age 34); Belgrade, SFR Yugoslavia

Nikola Dragutinović (Serbian Cyrillic: Никола Драгутиновић; born 22 April 1991) is a Serbian actor.

== Career ==
Dragutinović appeared in the 2015 Serbian film Pored Mene (Next to Me), directed by Stevan Filipović.

Previously he played Sone in the 2012 drama Clip.

TV roles in Serbia have included the first season of TV series Military Academy (Vojna Akademija) (2012) and Emergency Center (2015).

He also appeared in Artiljer (2012), directed by Srdja Andjelić and played Gavrilo Princip in a drama-doc.

Nikola graduated from the Academy of Arts, Belgrade in 2015, under the tutelage of Serbian actress Mirjana Karanović.

His latest theatre role is in Dear Dad (2016), directed by Mirjana Karanović and written by Milena Bogavac, at Belgrade’s Children’s Cultural Centre.
