= Milan Marić (actor, born 1990) =

Serbian actor

- Милан Марић
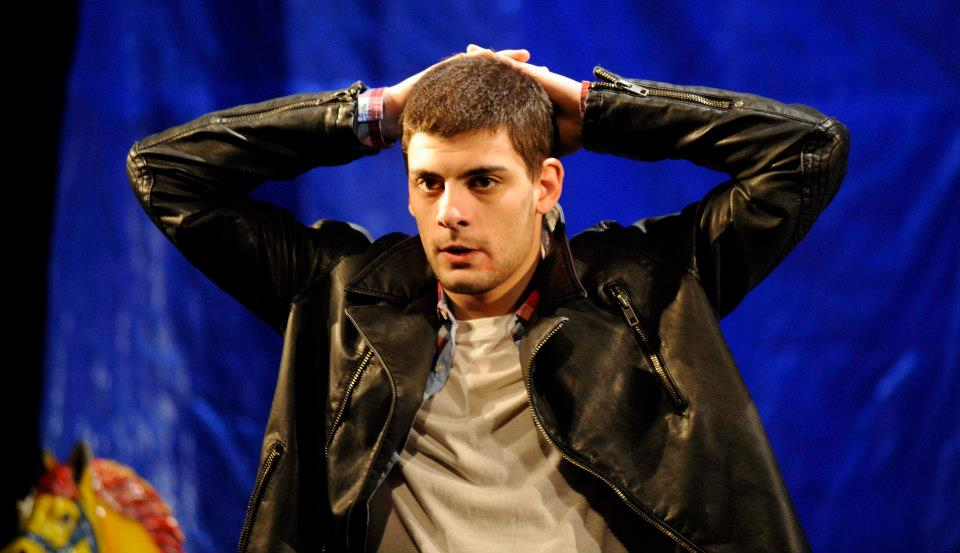
- Milan Marić at the press conference of the film Dovlatov by Alexei German Jr. Berlinale 2018.
- Born: Milan Marić; July 31, 1990 (age 35); Belgrade, SR Serbia, SFR Yugoslavia
- Occupation: Actor
- Years active: 2000, 2010–present

Milan Marić (Serbian: Милан Марић; born 31 July 1990) is a Serbian actor, best known for his role in Dovlatov.

== Biography ==
Milan Marić was born in 1990 in Belgrade, Serbia (then SR Serbia, SFR Yugoslavia). He appeared on stage as a teenager in the youth theater DADOV, and then entered the Faculty of Dramatic Art.

His cinematic debut was in the short film Thursday (2010), the diploma work of director Nikola Ljuca. He followed the television film New Chance and the role of Koki in the series The Scent of Rain in the Balkans (2011). He made another co-operation with Nikola Ljuca acting in his short film Sergeant (2012), in which Miloš Timotijević was his screen partner.

In 2014, Milan appeared in the dramatic ensemble of the drama From Paupers to Princes about the break-up of Yugoslavia and the new heroes of society.

In parallel with the film career, he also debuted in professional theaters, acting in the plays Behind the Bars (Krusevac Theater, 2011), Workers Dying Singing (Bitef Theater, 2011), Suspicious Face (Yugoslav Drama Theatre, 2012) and in controversial piece presented by Zoran Djindjic (Atelje 212, 2013). After graduating in the class of Biljana Mašić in 2013, he became a permanent member of the Yugoslav Drama Theater.

On the centenary of the World War I celebration in 2014, he participated in three performances about the Young Bosnia and the Sarajevo assassination: portrayed Gavrilo Princip in the play Little is my grave by Biljana Srbljanović, Danilo Ilić in the play Zmajeubica by Milena Markovic and in the film The Man Who Defended Gavrilo Princip. The following year, there followed the supporting roles in the films Humidity, A Good Wife and Santa Maria della Salute, where he portrayed king Milan I of Serbia.

In 2018, he played young Vukan Nemanjić in the television series Nemanjić Family - the Birth of the Kingdom. For the purpose of shooting, he learned to ride and to fight with the sword. In the same year, the Russian film Dovlatov premiered, a biopic about the life of Russian writer Sergei Dovlatov, in which he played the main role. Marić was recommended by actress Danijela Stojanović for the role, who worked with director Alexei German Jr. on his previous film. She showed Marić's photographs pointing to the physical similarity between the Serbian actor and the Russian writer. After several rounds of casting, he got the role. Marić learned Russian in three months. The film was premiered in the main competition program at the Berlin International Film Festival in 2019, and Marić was presented with the Shooting Stars Award together with 3 more young promising actors.

== Selected filmography ==
- Dovlatov (2018)
- Toma (2021)
