= Have You Seen This Woman? =

Serbian drama fantasy film by Dušan Zorić and Matija Gluščević

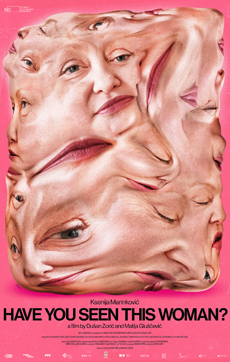
- International release poster
- Da li ste videli ovu ženu?
- Directed by: Dušan Zorić; Matija Gluščević
- Written by: Dušan Zorić; Matija Gluščević
- Produced by: Čarna Vučinić
- Starring: Ksenija Marinković; Isidora Simijonović; Boris Isaković; Alex Elektra; Ivana Vuković; Vlasta Velisavljević; Goran Bogdan; Jasna Đuričić; Radoje Čupić
- Cinematography: Aleksa Radunović; Marko Kažić; Milica Cimi Drinić Car
- Edited by: Olga Košarić
- Music by: Stipe Škokić - DJ Jock
- Production companies: Non-Aligned Films; Dinaridi Film; Radio Television of Serbia; Faculty of Dramatic Arts
- Release date: September 8, 2022 (Venice)
- Running time: 79 minutes
- Countries: Serbia; Croatia
- Language: Serbian

Have You Seen This Woman? (Serbian: Да ли сте видели ову жену?, Da li ste videli ovu ženu?) is a 2022 Serbian-Croatian fantasy drama film directed by Dušan Zorić and Matija Gluščević. It stars Ksenija Marinković as Draginja, a middle-aged woman trapped in the roles which patriarchal society tries to impose on her. The film is the directing duo's feature debut.

Have You Seen This Woman? premiered at the 37th International Critics' Week of the 79th Venice International Film Festival on September 8, 2022.

The film features the final performance of the late Vlasta Velisavljević.

== Cast ==
- Ksenija Marinković as Draginja
- Isidora Simijonović as Mala
- Boris Isaković as Zoran
- Alex Elektra as Tina
- Ivana Vuković as Mila
- Vlasta Velisavljević as Dad
- Goran Bogdan as Macan
- Jasna Đuričić as Jagoda
- Radoje Čupić as Draginja's husband
- Olga Odanović
- Marko Vasiljević
- Isidora Minić
- Tatjana Venčelovski
- Milica Mihajlović
- Miloš Timotijević as Draginja's brother
- Miloš Samolov
- Bojan Žirović
- Miloš Pantić

== Production ==
During production, the film was known under the working title Metamorphoses (Serbian: Метаморфозе, Metamorfoze) and it took over six years to complete. The project participated in the First Cut Lab consultancy programme, where it was mentored by Radu Jude, among others. It also took part in the First Cut + workshop at the Karlovy Vary International Film Festival and it won the image post-production award at the Thessaloniki International Film Festival Agora Works-in-progress 2019.

== Reception ==
Have You Seen This Woman?, described by the delegate general of the Venice International Film Critics' Week Beatrice Fiorentino as "the most incredibly unsettling film in the selection", opened in Venice to positive reviews.

Screen Daily described the film as "intriguing and often disconcerting" and pointed at Ksenija Marinković's "committed, sensitive and big-hearted" performance.

Italian newspaper Il manifesto said that the three Draginja's in the film played by the "excellent Ksenija Marinković" are "three symbols of an unstoppable decline, of a radical loneliness" and called the film "a remarkable debut".

Cineuropa underlined the film's surprising narrative, "one of the driving forces" of an "emotionally engaging film".

=== Accolades ===
Event	Category	Recipients	Result
Venice International Film Festival	Lion of the Future - Luigi de Laurentiis Venice Award for a Debut Film	Have You Seen This Woman?	Nominated
Venice International Film Festival	Grand Prize Settimana Internazionale della Critica	Have You Seen This Woman?	Nominated
Venice International Film Festival	Authors Under 40 - Special Mention	Olga Košarić (editor)	Won
Belgrade Auteur Film Festival	Grand Prix Aleksandar Saša Petrović	Have You Seen This Woman?	Won
World Film Festival of Bangkok	Best director	Dušan Zorić & Matija Gluščević (directors)	Won
Pula Film Festival	Golden Arena for Best Actress (Croatian Minority Productions)	Ksenija Marinković	Won
Pula Film Festival	Golden Arena for Best Cinematography (Croatian Minority Productions)	Aleksa Radunović, Marko Kažić & Milica Drinić	Won
Bilbao International Festival of Documentary and Short Films	ZINEBI First Film Award for Best Film	Dušan Zorić & Matija Gluščević	Nominated
Euro-Balkan Film Festival	Best Actress	Ksenija Marinković	Won
