= Jovana Stojiljković =

Serbian actress

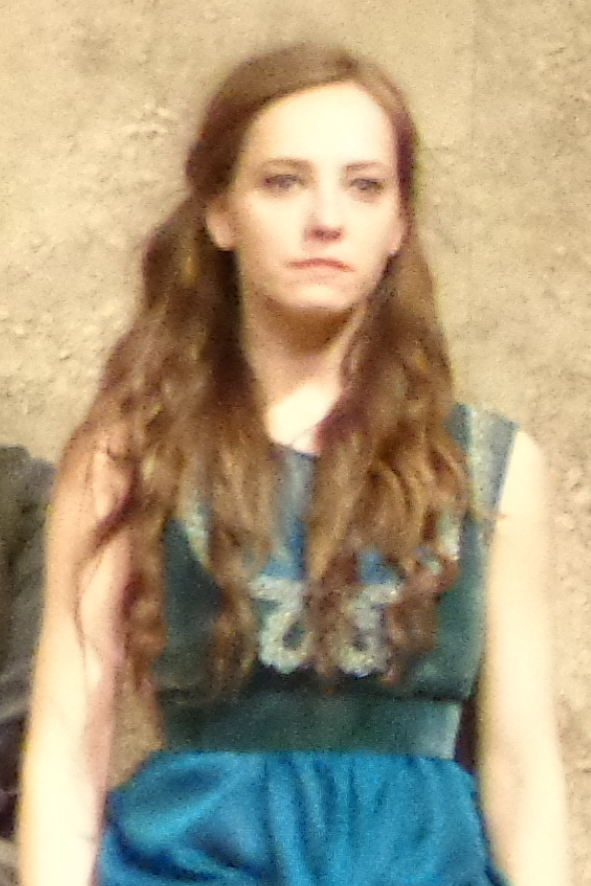
- Born: 19 March 1992 (age 34); Belgrade, SR Serbia, SFR Yugoslavia
- Occupation: Actress
- Years active: 2004–present
- Partner: Goran Bogdan (2019–present)
- Children: 1

Jovana Stojiljković (born 19 March 1992) is a Serbian stage and film actress. She is best known for her performance as Sofija in the TV series South Wind.

== Selected filmography ==
Year	Title	Role	Notes
2012	Clip	Tanja	
2014	The Man Who Defended Gavrilo Princip	Jelena	
2015	We Will Be the World Champions	Ksenija	
2015	Panama	Maja	
2017–2020	Balkan Shadows	Bojana Antić	TV series; 19 episodes
2018	South Wind	Sofija	
2019	Stitches	Ivana	
2020	South Wind	Sofija	TV series; 9 episodes
2021	The last socialist artefact	Šeila	TV series; 6 episodes
2026	No Fairy Dust	Marija	Midnight Screenings at the 32nd Sarajevo Film Festival
