= Katarina Čas =

Slovenian actress

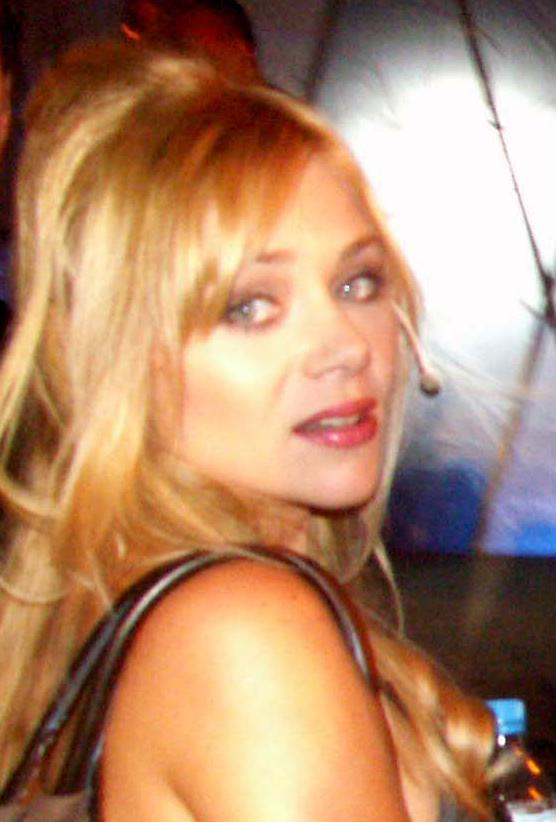
- Education: Faculty of Economics at the University of Ljubljana
- Occupation: Actress
- Years active: 1988–present

Katarina Čas ([kataˈriːna t͡ʃás]) is a Slovenian actress.

== Career ==
Čas first appeared on television in 1988, in a commercial for the Slovene soft drink company carbonated Cockta, directed by Jaka Judnič. In 1989, she appeared in her first movie, Peklenski načrt (The Infernal Plan), a Slovene youth film. From 1997, she hosted the music program Atlantis, which was broadcast on Kanal A. From 2005, she hosted the music program Aritmija on RTV Slovenija. In the Eurovision Song Contest 2005, she announced the votes given by Slovenia. She again announced the Slovene votes in the Eurovision Song Contest 2017. Her international career began in the 2011 Irish movie The Guard by John Michael McDonagh, where she played Gabriella. Then in the 2013 movie The Wolf of Wall Street, in which she played Chantalle. Later, she played Sophie in the 2015 movie Danny Collins opposite Al Pacino. She has worked on several UK TV series including, A Touch of Cloth, New Tricks, Death in Paradise, Silent Witness, Love Lies and Records, Wild Bill, Besa and Wild Cherry, as well as the U.S. TV series Berlin Station and Tom Clancy's Jack Ryan.

== Filmography ==
=== Film ===
Year	Title	Role	Notes
2000	V petek zvečer	Katja	aka: Friday Night
2007	Estrellita	–	Second assistant director: preproduction
2008	Reality	Blondie & Gipsy	
2011	The Guard	Gabriela McBride	
2012	Kekec, tri dni pred poroko	Mojca	
2013	The Wolf of Wall Street	Chantalle	
2014	Liam and Lenka	Lenka	Short film
2015	We Will Be the World Champions	American Newswoman	
2015	Danny Collins	Sophie	
2016	The Rift: Dark Side of the Moon	Liz Waid	
2017	Perseverance	Ukrainian Girl	
2017	Prebujanja	Ula	
2018	Terminal	Chloe Merryweather	
2018	A Christmas Prince: The Royal Wedding	Chef Ivana	
2019	Everything Is Different	Ines	Original title: Jaz sem Frank (I am Frank)
2019	Paradise - Una nuova vita	Klaudia	
2019	K.A.T. - Un Bacio Di Luna	–	Short film. Producer
2022	Gajin svet 2	Vivian / Bibi	
2024	Pa Tako Lep Dan Je Bil	Manca	aka: It Was a Beautiful Day. Also producer

=== Television ===
Year	Title	Role	Notes
1988	Cockta commercial	–	Slovene carbonated soft drink commercial
1991	Peklenski načrt	Spela	Television film (English title: The Internal Plan)
1997–1999	Atlantis	TV Host	Slovene music TV show host (covered popular music)
2005	Aritmija	TV Host	Slovene music TV show host (covers alternative music)
2006	Who Wants to Be a Mozart	Constanze Mozart / Jeannie	Television film
2007	Zauvijek susjedi	Urška	Croatian TV series; 1 episode (English title: Neighbors Forever)
2008	Hit poletja	Talk Show Host	Television film (English title: Summer Hit)
2008	Strasti	Ana	Slovene TV series; 1 episode (English title: Passions)
2010	Dan ljubezni	Martina	Slovene web series; 1 episode (English title: Day of Love)
2010	Prepisani	Barbra Zidar	Slovene web series; 15 episodes
2011	Pod sretnom zvijezdom	Ena Kolar	Croatian TV series; 71 episodes (English title: Under Lucky Star)
2012	Duhec	Klara Mirodolska	Mini-series; 3 episodes
2013	A Touch of Cloth	Katya	Series 2; episodes: "Undercover Cloth: Parts 1 & 2"
2013	New Tricks	Hana Keranovic	Series 10; episode: "Things Can Only Get Better"
2013–2014	Življenja Tomaža Kajzerja	Alenka Kajzer	Slovene TV series; 3 episodes (English title: Lives of Tomaž Kajzer)
2015	Death in Paradise	Imke Sandt	Series 4; episode 3
2015	Silent Witness	Kristina Bazhanov	Series 18; episode: "Squaring the Circle: Part 1"
2016	Prvaci sveta	Americka novinarka	Serbian TV series; 3 episodes
2017	Love, Lies and Records	Dominica	5 episodes
2018	Rubirosa	Doris Duke	Mini-series; 3 episodes
2018–2019	Berlin Station	Sofia Vesik	Season 3; 9 episodes
2019	Wild Bill	Lubica Varga	Mini-series; episode: "You're Stupid Enough to Say That to a Copper?"
2021	Besa	Lara Pirsch	Series 2; 5 episodes
2021–2023	Primeri inspekorja Vrenka	Mojca	Slovene TV series. Series 1 & 2; 7 episodes
2021–2024	Ja, chef	Pika Golob	Slovene TV series. Series 1–9; 83 episodes
2023	Tom Clancy's Jack Ryan	Katarina Celar	Season 4; episode: "Bethesda"
2025	Wild Cherry	Jelena Milanovic	6 episodes
