= Pasquale Esposito =

Pasquale Esposito may refer to:

- Pasquale Esposito (tenor)
- Pasquale Esposito (actor)
