= Hotel Portofino =

British period drama television series

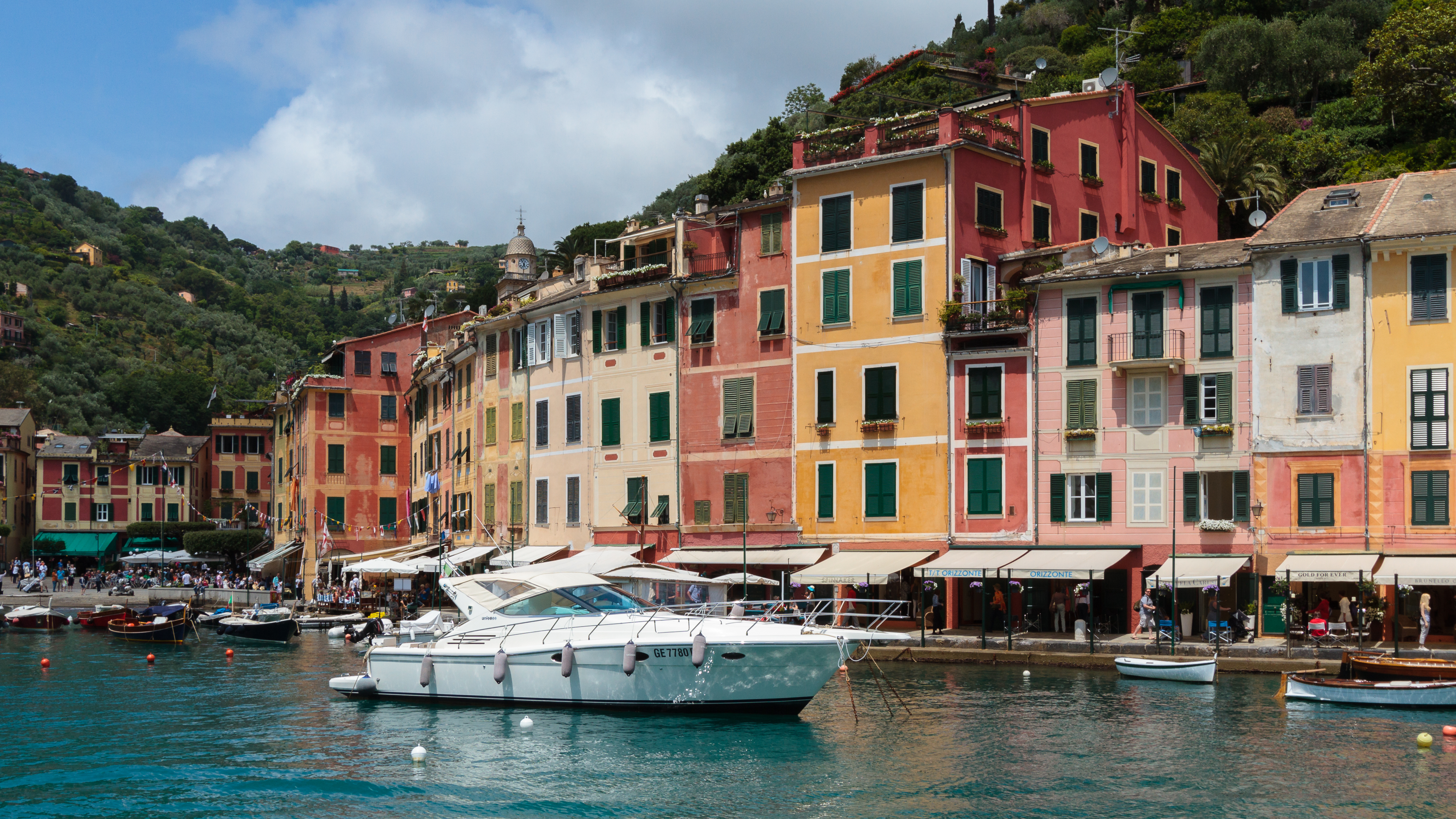
- Hotel picture from the series
- Genre: Period drama
- Created by: Matt Baker
- Written by: Matt Baker
- Directed by: Adam Wimpenny
- Starring: Natascha McElhone; Lucy Akhurst
- Composer: Stefano Cabrera
- Country of origin: United Kingdom
- Original language: English
- No. of series: 3
- No. of episodes: 18

Production
- Executive producers: Walter Iuzzolino; Jo McGrath
- Producer: Julie Bains
- Production locations: Italy; Croatia
- Cinematography: Erol Zubcevic
- Production company: Eagle Eye Drama

Original release
- Network: BritBox
- Release: 27 January 2022 – present

Hotel Portofino is a British period drama television series, created and written by Matt Baker. It is about a British family in the 1920s who own and operate a hotel for wealthy clients in an Italian resort town. The six-episode first series was released on BritBox in the United Kingdom on 27 January 2022 and began airing on ITV from 3 February 2023. It premiered on Sky Italia on 28 February 2022.

The series was renewed for a second season, which began broadcasting 12 February 2023. The show was renewed for a third series which aired in April 2024.

== Plot ==
Bella Ainsworth and her family run a hotel for wealthy holidaymakers in the resort town of Portofino, on the Italian Riviera. However, as they deal with the problems of running the hotel while subjected to deception and corruption, Italy is dealing with political turmoil brought on by the rise of the Fascist movement.

== Cast ==
=== Main ===
- Natascha McElhone as Isabella "Bella" Ainsworth, née Livesey, the owner of a British-style hotel in the Italian town of Portofino
- Oliver Dench as Lucian Ainsworth, Bella's son who is physically and emotionally wounded from the war
- Olivia Morris as Alice Mays-Smith, Bella's daughter and Lucian's sister
- Mark Umbers as Cecil Ainsworth, Bella's husband and Lucian and Alice's father, who is prone to dodgy dealings
- Louisa Binder as Constance March, the new nanny for Alice's daughter and a love interest of Lucian
- Elizabeth Carling as Betty Scanlon, the British cook for the hotel and old colleague to Constance's mother
- Lucy Akhurst as Julia Drummond-Ward (series 1–2), an old flame of Cecil and invited guest
- Claude Scott-Mitchell as Rose Drummond-Ward (series 1–2), Julia's daughter, who the parents hope will become Lucian's wife
- Anna Chancellor as Lady Latchmere (series 1), a hotel guest
- Imogen King as Melissa de Vere (series 1), Lady Latchmere's niece
- Daniele Pecci as Count Carlo Albani, an Italian fond of all things British and trusted advisor to Bella
- Lorenzo Richelmy as Roberto Albani (series 1), Carlo's son
- Assad Zaman as Dr Anish Sengupta (series 1–2), Lucian's best friend who is secretly in love with him
- Adam James as Jack Turner (main series 1; recurring series 3), an American arts dealer
- Lily Frazer as Claudine Pascal, a dancer-singer and movie star, Jack Turner's partner
- Pasquale Esposito as Signor Vincenzo Danioni, a local Fascist party politician
- Rocco Fasano as Gianluca Bruzzone (series 1–2), a local anti-Fascist and love interest for Anish
- Carolina Gonnelli as Paola (recurring series 1; main series 2), a hotel maid who has an affair with Lucian
- Louis Healy as Billy Scanlon (recurring series 1; main series 2), Betty's son and waiter for the hotel who gets in conflict with the Fascists
- Joseph Balderrama as Luigi Farrino (series 2), an Italian-American gangster from Detroit who runs a casino in an Italian town nearby
- Oscar Lloyd as Jonathan Bertram (series 2), a hotel guest and writer
- Giorgio Marchesi as Marco Bonacini (series 2-present), an architect hired by Bella and her love interest
- Roby Schinasi as Victor Michel (series 2), Alice's fiancé
- Camilla Rutherford as Amelia Jackson (series 3), Bella's sister
- David Schofield as George Livesey (series 3), Bella and Amelia's father

=== Recurring ===
- Petar Benčić as Francesco (series 1, 3), Cecil's assistant
- Maya Ramadan (series 1) and Laura Radetić (series 3) as Lottie Mays-Smith, Alice's daughter
- Henry Tomlinson as Edmund Ainsworth, Viscount Heddon (series 1–2), Cecil's brother
- Dominic Tighe as Pelham Wingfield (series 1), a hotel guest and professional tennis player
- Bethan Cullinane as Lizzie Wingfield (series 1), Pelham's wife
- Bruno Nacinovich as Salvatore (series 2-present), a worker for Marco and Betty's love interest
- Marko Braic as Bruno (series 2-present), a worker for Marco and Paola's love interest
- Melanie Gray as Jane Dodsworth (series 2), a hotel guest
- Michele Moran as Patricia Dodsworth (series 2), a hotel guest
- Antonio Scarpa as Sergeant Poretti (series 2), police chief in Portofino
- Francesco Martino as Antonio Costa (series 3), a Fascist blackshirt working for Danioni
- Shannon Tarbet as Nellie Gibson-White (series 3), Cecil's lover
- Corey Johnson as Randall Gibson-White (series 3), Cecil's stock broker and Nellie's father
- Leonardo Pazzagli as Vito (series 3), a friend of Bruno's and love interest for Constance
- Gurjeet Singh as Virat Sengupta (series 3), Anish's brother

== Episodes ==
=== Series 1 ===
No. overall	No. in series	Title	Directed by	Written by	Original release date	U.K. viewers (millions)
1	1	"First Impressions"	Adam Wimpenny	Matt Baker	27 January 2022	N/A
Bella Ainsworth and her husband, Cecil, along with their grown children, Lucian and Alice, are navigating the difficulties of running an English centric hotel in the Italian coastal town of Portofino. Rose and her mother, Julia, arrive at the hotel to evaluate marriage prospects with Lucian. Lady Latchmere and her niece, Melissa, Anish Sengupta, a friend of Lucian, an Italian Count and his son, along with American Jack Turner and his wife Claudine, round out the rest of the guests. Constance March arrives and is the new nanny hired to care for the child of Alice. Cecil has a prior relationship with Julia and isn't above stealing from the business to maintain his lifestyle. Bella also has to contend with a local Fascist politician, Danioni.
2	2	"Lessons"	Adam Wimpenny	Matt Baker	3 February 2022	N/A
Bella refuses Cecil's demands to ask her father for more money for the hotel. Cecil arranges for a family heirloom to be sent from England for authentication by Jack Turner, who claims to be connected to the art society of Europe and America. Danioni ingratiates himself with Cecil and earns an invitation to tea, much to Bella's horror. Lucian gives Rose a painting lesson ending in an unfortunate accident. New guests, Pelham Wingfield, a tennis pro, and his wife, Lizzie arrive. Bella realizes how serious Danioni is about his blackmail threat.
3	3	"Invitations"	Adam Wimpenny	Matt Baker	10 February 2022	N/A
Lucian and Anish, run afoul of Danioni's Blackshirts but are rescued by a charismatic local, Gianluca Bruzzone. Claudine begins a fling with Roberto Albani, while Cecil and Jack shake on a shady deal for the sale of his family heirloom, a possible painting by artist Paul Rubens, while Wingfield listens in. Bella and Lady Latchmere bond over a family tragedy and later, Bella throws a tea party for the locals to try and earn more money. Some of the hotel guests are invited to the home of a local aristocrat but Rose instead attends a party some of the younger set have at the hotel, where she lets her hair down to the disgust of her mother Julia. Anish decides to become more involved in the anti-fascist movement, to Lucians dismay and they must make a quick escape from the Blackshirts and Danioni at their first meeting.
4	4	"Uncoverings"	Adam Wimpenny	Matt Baker	17 February 2022	N/A
5	5	"Discoveries"	Adam Wimpenny	Matt Baker	24 February 2022	N/A
6	6	"Denouements"	Adam Wimpenny	Matt Baker	3 March 2022	N/A

=== Series 2 ===
No. overall	No. in series	Title	Directed by	Written by	Original release date	Viewers (millions)
7	1	"Returns"	Adam Wimpenny	Matt Baker	12 February 2023 (AUS)	N/A
7	1	"Returns"	Adam Wimpenny	Matt Baker	17 March 2023 (UK)	N/A
8	2	"Alliances"	Adam Wimpenny	Matt Baker	19 February 2023 (AUS)	N/A
8	2	"Alliances"	Adam Wimpenny	Matt Baker	24 March 2023 (UK)	N/A
9	3	"Coming Together"	Adam Wimpenny	Matt Baker	26 February 2023 (AUS)	N/A
9	3	"Coming Together"	Adam Wimpenny	Matt Baker	31 March 2023 (UK)	N/A
10	4	"Contortions"	Adam Wimpenny	Matt Baker	5 March 2023 (AUS)	N/A
10	4	"Contortions"	Adam Wimpenny	Matt Baker	7 April 2023 (UK)	N/A
11	5	"Subterfuges"	Adam Wimpenny	Matt Baker	12 March 2023 (AUS)	N/A
11	5	"Subterfuges"	Adam Wimpenny	Matt Baker	14 April 2023 (UK)	N/A
12	6	"Farewells"	Adam Wimpenny	Matt Baker	19 March 2023 (AUS)	N/A
12	6	"Farewells"	Adam Wimpenny	Matt Baker	21 April 2023 (UK)	N/A

=== Series 3 ===
No. overall	No. in series	Title	Directed by	Written by	Original release date	Viewers (millions)
13	1	"Entitled"	Jon Jones	Matt Baker	25 April 2024	N/A
13	1	"Entitled"	Jon Jones	Matt Baker	N/A	N/A
14	2	"Proposals"	Jon Jones	Matt Baker	2 May 2024	N/A
14	2	"Proposals"	Jon Jones	Matt Baker	N/A	N/A
15	3	"Realizations"	Jon Jones	Matt Baker	9 May 2024	N/A
15	3	"Realizations"	Jon Jones	Matt Baker	N/A	N/A
16	4	"Experiments"	Jon Jones	Matt Baker	16 May 2024	N/A
16	4	"Experiments"	Jon Jones	Matt Baker	N/A	N/A
17	5	"Revelations"	Jon Jones	Matt Baker	23 May 2024	N/A
17	5	"Revelations"	Jon Jones	Matt Baker	N/A	N/A
18	6	"Masquerades"	Jon Jones	Matt Baker	30 May 2024	N/A
18	6	"Masquerades"	Jon Jones	Matt Baker	N/A	N/A

== Production ==
Baker created and wrote the first series in 2020. Principal photography took place on location in Rijeka, Lovran, and Rovinj, Croatia. A minor part was filmed in Portofino, Italy in 2021.

The second series began filming in July 2022. It was Croatia's largest television production of that year. The production employed 135 Croatian crew, including 13 out of 14 heads of departments, and more than 800 extras.

== Release ==
BetaFilm Group is handling international distribution of the series. In June 2021, it was announced the first series of Hotel Portofino had been sold to BritBox and ITV, Sky Italia, Foxtel in Australia and the American broadcaster PBS. Sales expanded to Danish DR, Swedish SVT, Norwegian NRK, Finnish Yle, Icelandic Sýn and Dutch NPO by October.

BritBox released a trailer for the first series on 5 January 2022.

A novelisation of the series, written by J.P. O'Connell, was published in December 2021 ahead of the series launch on BritBox. A follow-up novel, Hotel Portofino: Lovers and Liars, was published on 15 February 2024.

Series 2 began airing on U&DRAMA on Friday 8 November.

== Reception ==
Radio Times consistently complimented the first series, awarding Hotel Portofino a glowing front cover and countless Picks of the Day. Jane Rackham also boasted the 'sumptuous period drama' as 'enjoyable escapism' in the magazine.

In more critical reviews, Anita Singh in The Telegraph gave the first series two out of five stars, praising the production values but unimpressed by the writing. Singh remarked, "It is a drama serial which draws so heavily from The Durrells and Downton Abbey that it could have been assembled from an ITV kit, although it is a pale imitation of both."

Barbara Ellen of The Observer awarded the second series two out of five stars, summarizing it as 'so silly you may just enjoy it.'
