= Isidora Simijonović =

Serbian actress

Isidora Simijonović (Serbian Cyrillic: Исидора Симијоновић; born 21 June 1995 in Belgrade) is a Serbian actress.

She is best known for her performance as Saša in the TV drama series Jutro će promeniti sve, which follows the lives of a group of young adults in contemporary Belgrade. Isidora graduated acting from Belgrade Academy of Arts.

Simijonović began her acting career with the play Pazi vamo performed in Boško Buha theatre in 2010, when she was still in high school. After she had enrolled the academy, she has played in few Belgrade theaters including National Theatre in Belgrade, Belgrade drama theatre, Atelje 212, Bitef theater and Zvezdara theater.

Her film career started with a lead role in the movie Klip, when she was 16 years old. She portrays a sullen high school student from a Belgrade suburb. For her performance, she won the award for the best actress at the Vilnius International Film Festival and 'The Golden Hazelnut' (Zlatni lešnik) award for the best actress at the fifth International Festival of Film Direction in Leskovac. After this breakthrough debut role, Simijonović went on to star in several films such as Gde je Nađa? and Atomski zdesna. She also played Katarina in Dobra žena which was screened at many film festivals, including Sundance Film Festival, FEST (Belgrade) and Crossing Europe in Linz. She made her television debut with a minor role in Andrija i Anđelka. She is also known for her role of Ruža in popular crime television show Ubice moga oca.

She played journalist Nataša in Porodica, a five-part drama series about the arrest of Slobodan Milošević, released in 2021.

For her stage performance in Jami distrikt she received Dara Čalenic Foundation Award for the Best Young Actress on theatre festival Sterijino pozorje.

== Filmography ==
=== Film ===
Year	Title	Role	Notes
2012	Clip (Serbian: Klip)	Jasna	
2013	Gde je Nađa? (Where is Nađa?)	Sandra	
2014	Atomski zdesna (Atomic from the right)	Dušica	
2015	Haiku	Daughter	in pre-production
2016	Dobra žena (A Good Wife)	Katarina	
2022	Have You Seen This Woman?	Mala	

=== Television ===
Year	Title	Role	Notes
2016	Andrija i Anđelka	Anđelka's classmate	2. season, 24. episode
2016	Mamurluci	Unknown	Pilot episode
2017	Ubice mog oca	Ruža (Ružica)	Season 2
2018	Jutro će promeniti sve	Saša (Aleksandra)	
2020	Močvara	Neda	
2021	Porodica	Nataša	
2025	The Librarians- The Next Chapter	Yelena	Season 1, Episode 2

==== Theatre credits ====
Year	Title	Role	Venue
2012	Pazi vamo	Ivana	Boško Buha Theatre, Belgrade
2016	Gozba	Dušica	Zvezdara teatar, Belgrade
2017	Jami Distrikt	Srbija	Bitef teatar
2018	Sumnjivo lice		Reflektor teatar
2018	Osama kasaba u Njujorku	Esma	Zvezdara teatar
2018	Balava	Balava	Beogradsko dramsko pozorište
2018	M.I.R.A.		Bitef teatar
2019	A Midsummer Night's Dream	Hermia	National Theatre in Belgrade
2019	The Dummed	Martin	Beogradsko dramsko pozorište
2019	Testirano na ljudima	Eva	Atelje 212
2020	Jugojugoslavija		Beogradsko dramsko pozorište
2021	Cement - Beograd		Beogradsko dramsko pozorište
