= South Wind (film) =

2018 Serbian film

- Directed by: Miloš Avramović
- Starring: Miloš Biković; Nebojša Glogovac; Milos Timotijevic
- Release date: 25 August 2018
- Country: Serbia
- Languages: Serbian; Bulgarian
- Budget: 360,000 €
- Box office: 2,365,712 €

South Wind (Serbian: Јужни ветар, romanized: Južni vetar) is a 2018 Serbian crime film directed by Miloš Avramović. The film was released on 25 August 2018 at the Niš Film Festival. A sequel, South Wind: Speed Up, was released on 4 November 2021.

== Plot ==
Petar Maraš, a member of the Belgrade car mafia, leaves his parents' home and moves into his new apartment with his long-time girlfriend, Sofija. The clan he belongs to is led by the a man named Dragoslav, and police are not giving them any problems.

== Cast ==
- Miloš Biković as Petar Maraš
- Nebojša Glogovac as Golub
- Dragan Bjelogrlić as Dragoslav
- Miloš Timotijević as Stupar
- Miodrag Radonjić as Baća
- Srđan Todorović as Jani
- Jovana Stojiljković as Sofija
- Jasna Đuričić as Anđela Maraš
- Aleksandar Berček as Crveni (Red)
- Miki Manojlović as Car (Tzar)

== Adaptations ==
A TV series based on the film was announced in 2019 and premiered on 19 January 2020.

== Soundtrack ==
=== Track listing ===
No.	Title	Length
1.	"4 strane sveta" (by Coby and Senidah)	2:44
2.	"Grmi"	2:50
3.	"Mače"	3:32
4.	"Južni vetar gas"	3:17
5.	"Grad greha"	3:26
6.	"Mojne s' nama"	3:18
7.	"Hollywood"	2:14
Total length:		21:21
