= Besa (TV series) =

Serbian television series

- Official poster for the first season
- Also known as: Besa; Besa: Blood Oath
- Genre: Drama; Thriller
- Created by: Tony Jordan
- Screenplay by: Tony Jordan; Mladen Matičević; Igor Stoimenov
- Directed by: Dušan Lazarević
- Starring: Radivoje Bukvić; Miloš Timotijević; Arben Bajraktaraj
- Composer: Nemanja Mosurović
- Countries of origin: Serbia; United Kingdom
- Original languages: Serbian; Albanian
- No. of seasons: 2
- No. of episodes: 22

Production
- Executive producers: Tony Jordan; Srđan Šaper; Pete Smith; Henning Tewes
- Producers: Tea Korolija; Igor Stoimenov
- Production companies: Adrenalin Production; Red planet pictures

Original release
- Release: December 18, 2018 – December 26, 2021

Besa (Serbian: Беса) is a Serbian-British television series produced by Adrenalin and Red Planet Pictures.

== Synopsis ==
Inspired by a true story and from an original idea by Srđan Šaper, the plot follows Uroš, a family man and a businessman from Belgrade who kills the daughter of Dardan, an Albanian drug lord, in a road accident. To atone for her death and in order to protect the lives of his own family, he is forced to start working as a hitman for the Albanian mob.

Besa is an Albanian cultural precept, usually translated as 'faith' or 'oath', that means 'to keep the promise' and 'word of honor'.

== Production ==
Besa brought together writer/producer Tony Jordan and several Serbian screenwriters and script doctors, as well as international and regional actors, in creating the first TV series in the Adriatic region that compares with the standards of British television drama.

Besa features a mixture of local and international talent, with Taken costars Radivoje Bukvić and Arben Bajraktaraj playing the leads. Director Dušan Lazarević previous credits include Misfits, Vera, Death In Paradise, Silent Witness. The series gathered more than 200 actors from the entire territory of the former Yugoslavia, as well as foreign actors from Albania, United Kingdom and France.

Besa was set up as an international co-production between Adrenalin and Red Planet Pictures. It was filmed for 120 days on numerous attractive locations throughout the Balkans. International sales and Distribution is handled by MBC Studios.

The second season was shot from 2020 to 2021 in Montenegro, Serbia and Estonia.

== Awards ==
At FEDIS, the 9th International festival of domestic television series, Besa won the Golden Antenna award for Best TV series produced in Serbia, as well as for Best Music by composer Nemanja Mosurović and Best Photography by the director of photography Igor Šunter.

== Cast and characters ==
Roles	Actors
Uroš Perić	Radivoje Bukvić
Dardan Berisha	Arben Bajraktaraj
Petrit Koci	Miloš Timotijević
Marija Perić	Lana Barić
Teuta Berisha	Gresa Pallaska
Divna Dukić	Hana Selimović
Mima	Radoslav Milenković
Hashimi	Mensur Safqiu
Luka	Milan Marić
Una Perić	Milica Gojković
Agim Sokoli	Sebastian Cavazza
Skenderi	Selman Jusufi
Boža Perić	Miodrag Krivokapić
Besiana	Elizabeta Brodić
Afrimi	Allmir Suhodolli
Miša	Boris Milivojević
Pavle	Ivan Zarić
Mirko Sandić	Marko Janjić
Premović	Nebojša Dugalić
Driton Berisha	Jon Raci
Todor Lekić	Mima Karadžić
Isa (Skenderi)	Refet Abazi
Ilir Sokoli	Tristan Halilaj
Joni	Slaven Došlo
Enver	Adrijan Aziri
Ivan	Jovo Maksić
Igi	Relja Popović

== Adaptation ==
A Philippine-Malaysian adaptation has been announced on December 3, 2025 and will release on iWant in the Philippines and Astro in Malaysia as their own original content.
