= Slaven Došlo =

Serbian actor

- Славен Дошло
- Born: 11 April 1991 (age 35); Sombor, SR Serbia, SFR Yugoslavia (now Serbia)
- Occupation: Actor
- Years active: 2015–present

Slaven "Slavko" Došlo (Serbian Cyrillic: Славен "Славко" Дошло; born 11 April 1991) is a Serbian actor. He is best known for his highly praised roles in Next to Me (2015) and Panama (2015).

== Biography ==
Došlo graduated from Belgrade's Academy of Arts, Alfa university. He starred in Serbia's biggest domestic film of 2015, Next to Me. His stand-out performance as a sharp-witted high school student who enjoys Serbian cinema's first teenage gay kiss attracted critical acclaim at home and abroad. He followed this up with a lead role in the film Panama.

He starred in Humidity, a captivating drama from Serbian director Nikola Ljuca, which won the Best Film Award at the Belgrade Film Festival FEST in February 2016.

In April 2016, Došlo signed on to play a new recruit in RTS TV series Vojna akademija.

As well as numerous local productions, Došlo has performed in musical theatre at Belgrade's renowned Terazije Theatre in productions of Zorba the Greek and Glavo luda, based on the songs of Zdravko Čolić.

== Awards and recognition ==
For his performance in the Award-winning play by Filip Vujošević, Life Stands Still, Life Goes On at Belgrade's Bitef Theatre, in 2015, Slaven received the Dara Calenic Foundation Award for Best Young Actor.

In October 2015 Došlo was named Actor of the Year in the first ‘League of Extraordinary Gentlemen’ from Serbia's Men's Health magazine.

In November 2016, Došlo received his first international award for acting, in the form of an Angela Award from Ireland's Subtitle European Film Festival.

== Filmography ==
=== Film ===
Year	Title	Role	Notes
2011	Susret	Guy at the Party	Short film
2015	Panama	Jovan	
2015	Izgleda da smo sami	Deki	Short film
2015	Next to Me	Lazar	
2016	Humidity	Milan	
2016	Melancholic Drone		Short film
2016	Fluffy	Reporter	Short film
2016	Sarajevo Songs of Woe		
2016	Military Academy 3	Ilija "Ika" Morača	
2017	Biser Bojane	Đorđe	
2017	Život traje tri dana	Bogdan / Poolboy	Short film
2017	Priority		Short film
2019	Military Academy 5	Ilija "Ika" Morača	
2019	Breaking Point: A Star Wars Story	Kess Dust	Short film
2020	Porajmos	Francov posilni Mark	Short film
2021	Celts	Neša	
2024	Beautiful Evening, Beautiful Day	Stevan Petrović	
2024	Next to Us	Lazar	

=== Television ===
Year	Title	Role	Notes
2014	Emergency Center	Žica	2 episodes
2016	Prvaci sveta	Bane	6 episodes
2016	Pundravci 2	Vukašin	Episode: "Vukašin"
2017–2020	Military Academy	Ilija "Ika" Morača	38 episodes
2017; 2023	Ja volim Srbiju	Himself (contestant)	Game show; 2 episodes
2017	Komšije	Mihajlo Bajat	6 episodes
2018–2019	Biser Bojane	Đorđe Popović	11 episodes
2018	Next to Me: The Musical	Lazar	TV special
2019–2021	Black & White World	Lepi Zile	13 episodes
2019	Besa	Jon	2 episodes
2021	Kaljave gume	Fransoa	Episode: "Dan zahvalnosti"
2021	Svindleri	Aleksandar	12 episodes
2021	Aviondžije	Miloš "Ceger" Stoisavljević	24 episodes
2022	Branilac	Ilija Jović	Episode: "Ilijino posrnuće"
2023	My Father's Murderers	Nenad	11 episodes
2023	Južni vetar: Na granici	Counselor	Episode: "Part 5"
2023	Deca zla	Milan Jovanović / Alen Zilkić	9 episodes
2024	Pesma za Evroviziju '24	Himself (host)	Eurovision Song Contest 2024 national selection
2024	Martin Scorsese Presents: The Saints	Other SS Officer	Episode: "Maximilian Kolbe"
