= Mrs Sidhu Investigates =

British detective TV series

- Genre: Cosy; Crime; Mystery
- Created by: Suk Pannu
- Based on: The BBC Radio 4 series by Suk Pannu
- Written by: Suk Pannu; Vivienne Harvey
- Directed by: Steve Barron; Ben Kellett
- Starring: Meera Syal; Craig Parkinson
- Composer: Cora Miron
- Country of origin: United Kingdom
- Original language: English
- No. of series: 1
- No. of episodes: 4

Production
- Executive producers: Jane Wallbank; Steve Barron; Alison Carpenter; Debra Hayward; Gordon Kennedy; Catherine Mackin; Alison Owen; Suk Pannu; Meera Syal; Bea Tammer
- Producer: Jane Wallbank
- Running time: 90 minutes
- Production companies: Absolutely Television; Acorn TV; Monumental Pictures

Original release
- Network: Acorn TV (US); UKTV
- Release: 18 September – 9 October 2023

Mrs Sidhu Investigates is a British mystery crime television series, which is produced by and broadcast on Acorn TV. The series was created by Suk Pannu, based on his BBC Radio 4 series, and stars Meera Syal in the title role (which she also originated on radio). As of 2024, there has been no confirmation of a second series.

== Synopsis ==
Recently widowed caterer Mrs. Sidhu juggles her business with encouraging her son Tez (Singh) to find his passion, all while solving crimes in Berkshire.

== Cast ==
- Meera Syal as Mrs Sidhu
- Craig Parkinson as DCI Burton
- Naana Agyei-Ampadu as Sergeant Mint
- Gurjeet Singh as Tez Sidhu
- Gordon Kennedy as Superintendent De Vries
- Lee Nicholas Harris as Police Sergeant Keely
- Kishore Bhatt as Mr. Ramgariah

== Episodes ==
| No. | Title | Directed by | Written by | Original release date |
|---|---|---|---|---|
| 1 | "Ripped" | Steve Barron | Suk Pannu | 18 September 2023 |
| 2 | "Breaking Convention" | Steve Barron | Vivienne Harvey | 25 September 2023 |
| 3 | "Killer App" | Ben Kellett | Suk Pannu | 2 October 2023 |
| 4 | "On the Ropes" | Ben Kellett | Vivienne Harvey | 2 October 2023 |
