= Skinning (film) =

2010 film by Stevan Filipović

- Directed by: Stevan Filipović
- Written by: Stevan Filipović; Staša Koprivica; Dimitrije Vojnov; Nataša Vranješ
- Produced by: Branislav Jević
- Starring: Nikola Rakočević; Viktor Savić; Bojana Novakovic
- Cinematography: Mihajlo Savić
- Edited by: Stevan Filipović; Nataša Vranješ
- Distributed by: Hypnopolis
- Release date: 6 October 2010
- Country: Serbia
- Language: Serbian
- Budget: €500,000
- Box office: €171,052

Skinning (Serbian: Шишање / Šišanje) is a 2010 Serbian film directed by Stevan Filipović. It premiered on 6 October 2010 in Sava Centar in Belgrade.

== Plot ==
The film opens with actual news footage of protests in front of the American embassy in Belgrade following the "Kosovo is Serbia" protest rally that was held in response to the 17 February 2008 unilateral declaration of independence by ethnic Albanians inhabiting Serbia's southern province of Kosovo. This news footage is intercut with shots of the movie's main protagonist, skinhead Novica, protesting by leading chants and lighting flares in front of the embassy while he's also providing narration.

The story than backs up as Novica, a timid and geeky high school student with frumpy clothing and disheveled thick hair, is introduced. He lives in Belgrade where his life revolves around attending advanced math classes for gifted kids and taking part in math competitions. Due to his awkwardness around people, his social life is nothing to speak of—his only friends are his stoner cousin Mirko as well as an even nerdier math colleague Stanislav.

At a math competition as the students are working away solving problems, Novica is pressured into facilitating cheating by Relja, a confident skinhead full of bravado who is also gifted at math but doesn't quite possess Novica's math problem-solving skills. Relja is seated relatively close to Novica at the competition and is stuck on a question that he can't solve. Flattered by the attention from a kid placed much higher on the high school social scale, Novica passes Relja the solution scribbled on a piece of paper. The competition supervisor notices something untoward occurred and tells Novica to report the person he had helped without penalty to himself. Wanting to cover for Relja, Novica purposely wrongly points out nerdy Stanislav as the recipient of his help, leading to the supervisor throwing both Novica and Stanislav out thus breaking her promise to spare Novica.

Outside, Relja is happy and impressed with Novica's behaviour under pressure, handing him a copy of Hitler's Mein Kampf as well as extending an invite to a lecture by professor Hadži-Tankosić at the University of Belgrade's Faculty of Philosophy. Novica brings his cousin Mirko along who—dissatisfied with the right-wing, anti-Semitic overtones in professor's lecture—leaves early on. Novica, on the other hand, remains and is very much receptive to what he's hearing.

The next day, Relja takes Novica to a football match since his skinheads are active as fans of FK Radnik—corrupt lower-league club financed by the local gangster nicknamed Pufta. Ostensibly faithful supporters of the club, they don't actually care much for football and mostly use the matches as a public platform to raise the group's profile and further their right-wing political agenda through racist chanting, violence, and hooliganism. Additionally, skinheads have an extremely antagonistic relationship with the club's financier Pufta, regularly getting into fights with "Pufta's diesel boys"—a small fan group on his payroll. Since he doesn't own the club, Pufta's motivation for getting involved with football is taking advantage of his vaguely defined "financier role" in order to siphon off the funds from player transfers to clubs abroad. As he conducts his business in ruthless manner, his biggest rivals are similarly-run FK Kosančić, a club that also has a financier—a mafia widow. At this particular match, FK Radnik is playing FK Novi Pazar and there's no shortage of hateful chants and violence as Novica and Relja, among others, get taken to the police station where they're questioned by corrupt inspector Milutin and young idealistic policewoman Lidija who had recently joined the force. She immediately notices that Novica doesn't quite fit the usual skinhead profile and encourages him to get out, even handing him her personal contact in case he ever needs help.

Couple of days later, Relja formally introduces Novica to the various individuals that make up his skinhead, white supremacist group, including his sexy girlfriend Mina and computer geek Svarog, all of whom hang out in an underground swastika-adorned cave where they mostly guzzle beer and listen to hard core bands such as Direktori. As it turns out, Novica already knows Mina from the neighbourhood (they once got jumped by a group of diesel boys, barely managing to escape) and already harbours some emotions towards her. Mina seduces Novica, symbolising his seduction into the world of racist skinheads.

Hanging out one night, under the influence of alcohol, the group is walking along the river quay when they run into one of the diesel boys who's all by himself. In addition to belonging to their hated rival group, he's also Romani, which makes him even more of a target in their eyes. Relja however orders them not to bother, but Novica who is for the confrontation with the others backing him with words, charges and beats the guy with fists. Relja and the others pull Novica from killing the Gypsy but he surprises all by taking construction block piece and kills the Gypsy. Shocked by the gruesome crime Novica just committed, other skinheads panic a bit before regrouping and deciding to dump the body into the river and sink it with rocks.

== Cast ==
- Nikola Rakočević as Novica
- Viktor Savić as Relja
- Bojana Novakovic as Mina
- Nikola Kojo as Milutin
- Nataša Tapušković as Officer Lidija
- Predrag Ejdus as Nazi Professor Hadži–Tankosić
- Milan Mihailović as Novica's father

Actor Dragan Mićanović made an appearance in the film. Popular Serbian journalist and television presenter Ivon Jafali also appeared in the film as the journalist.

== Production ==
The pre–production of Skinning began in 2007. The director Stevan Filipović got some funds from the SEE Cinema Network in Thessaloniki. The film was shot in stages, as it required great transformations of the actors, which included training in the gym and changing haircuts.

== Motifs ==
Though on occasion applying a thin disguise when it comes to actual names, the movie references and alludes to various individuals, organizations, and events from the Serbian public life during the 2000s.

The fictitious FK Radnik from Belgrade is obviously FK Rad, the club that has a small but violent core of right-wing fans known for clashes with the fans of FK Novi Pazar. Radnik's fictitious cross-town rival FK Kosančić run by an unnamed attractive mafia-widow obviously refers to FK Obilić (instead of Miloš Obilić, one famous medieval Serbian knight from the Battle of Kosovo, the club is named after another one, Ivan Kosančić), while its owner/financier bears an uncanny physical resemblance to Obilić's one-time president Ceca Ražnatović, the widow of slain gangster Arkan.

In fact, many details from the football subplot in the movie are lifted straight from B92 television investigative programme Insajder's 2008 exposé "Pravila igre" and the 2009 one called "(Ne)moć države" both of which uncovered and alleged high levels of organized criminality and systemic corruption within the Serbian league football.

== Reception ==
The film grossed €30,193 during its opening weekend in Serbia. As of 29 November 2010, it grossed €171,052. It ended its theatrical run in Serbia in late February 2011, grossing the total of US$288,512.

One reviewer wrote: "Skinning is an obligatory, which must be seen by almost all parents who raise a teenager in their home... Especially those whose talents are unimaginable. And especially the parents who doubt to have a genius, because the line between genius and madness is thin. Skinning divides nationalism and false patriotism from violence and anarchy." Press.
