= Clip (film) =

2012 film

- Theatrical release poster
- Directed by: Maja Miloš
- Written by: Maja Miloš
- Produced by: Srđan Golubović; Jelena Mitrović
- Starring: Isidora Simijonović
- Cinematography: Vladimir Simić
- Production company: Film House Baš Čelik
- Release dates: 27 January 2012 (IFFR); 12 April 2012 (Serbia)
- Running time: 102 minutes
- Country: Serbia
- Language: Serbian

Clip (Serbian: Клип, romanized: Klip) is a 2012 Serbian drama film written and directed by Maja Miloš, her first time directing, and starring Isidora Simijonović in her first film role. The film's title derives from the many short cell phone videos made by the film's central character, Jasna (Simijonović), a troubled teenager whose family is falling apart. The film was released in Serbia on 12 April 2012 at Belgrade's Sava Centar. Simijonović won the award for the best actress at the Vilnius International Film Festival and 'The Golden Hazelnut' (Zlatni lešnik) award for the best actress at the fifth International Festival of Film Direction in Leskovac.

== Cast ==
- Isidora Simijonović as Jasna
- Vukasin Jasnić as Đorđe "Đole" Tošić
- Sanja Mikitisin as Jasna's mother
- Jovo Maksić as Jasna's father
- Monja Savić as Marija
- Katarina Pešić as Ivana
- Sonja Janičić as Sanja
- Jovana Stojiljković as Tanja
- Vladimir Gvojić as Crni
- Nikola Dragutinović as Šone

== Reception ==
The film holds a rating of 43% on review aggregator website Rotten Tomatoes and a score of 54 on Metacritic.

=== Controversy ===
Due to its realistic depiction of sex between minors (Simijonović was 14 when production began), the film was banned in Russia as child pornography. In interviews, Miloš said that prosthetics, dildos, special visual effects, and body doubles had been used, and that the film had a long post-production period.

=== Accolades ===
- Rotterdam International Film Festival – KNF Award 2012
