= Dušan Lazarević =

Film & television director

Dušan Lazarević is a London-based television and film director.

== Biography ==
Born in Belgrade, Serbia (Yugoslavia) Dušan started making short films while in high school. He came to the UK to attend the London Film School. War and the destruction of Yugoslavia compelled him to stay and build a career in the UK.

His graduation film, The Hottest Day of The Year, was a British entry at the AMPAS Student Academy Awards.

In 2019, he was nominated for a Daytime Emmy Award for Outstanding Directing For A Children's Series for Free Rein.

Amongst his recent work is Besa (TV series), a psychological crime thriller, created by British television writer Tony Jordan, set in the world of the Albanian mafia in the Balkans.

== Filmography ==
- The Hottest Day of the Year (1991) Film
- How to Kill (1992) TV Film
- Living with Lionel (2000) Animated TV series
- Hollyoaks (2003) TV series
- Hollyoaks: Let Loose (2005) TV series
- Grange Hill (2006) TV series
- Žene sa Dedinja (2011) TV series
- Misfits (TV series) (2012)
- Vera (TV series) (2013)
- Death in Paradise (TV series) (2014)
- Silent Witness (2014) TV series
- Free Rein (2018) TV series
- The Outpost (TV series) (2019)
- Besa (TV series) (2019)
