= South Wind (TV series) =

Serbian crime drama television series

- Genre: Crime
- Created by: Miloš Avramović
- Based on: South Wind by Miloš Avramović
- Written by: Petar Mihajlović
- Starring: Miloš Biković; Miodrag Radonjić; Miloš Timotijević; Miki Manojlović
- Country of origin: Serbia
- Original languages: Serbian, Bulgarian, Italian, Albanian
- No. of seasons: 1
- No. of episodes: 14

Production
- Executive producers: Miloš Avramović; Miloš Biković; Miodrag Radonjić; Tatjana Žeželj Gojković
- Production locations: Serbia; Croatia; Italy; Russia
- Cinematography: Ivan Kostić
- Editor: Bojan Kosović
- Running time: ± 45 minutes

Original release
- Network: Radio Television of Serbia
- Release: January 19 – April 19, 2020

South Wind (Serbian: Јужни ветар, romanized: Južni vetar) is a 2020 Serbian television series starring Miloš Biković, Miodrag Radonjić, Miki Manojlović, and Miloš Timotijević as main roles.

The first four episodes feature scenes from the 2018 film of the same name. In further episodes, the role of Dragoslav the Tsar was taken over by Predrag Manojlović from Dragan Bjelogrlić, who did not participate in further filming. A second series was announced in 2020 and premiered on 25 February 2023.

== Plot ==
A young criminal member of Belgrade mafia gang puts the lives of his family members in danger when he angers a mafia boss.

== Cast ==
- Miloš Biković as Petar Maraš
- Miodrag Radonjić as Baća
- Miloš Timotijević as Stupar
- Dragan Bjelogrlić as Dragoslav (ep. 1-4)
  - Miki Manojlović as Dragoslav (ep. 5-14)
- Hristo Shopov as Dimitar
- Nebojša Glogovac as Golub
- Ljubomir Bandović as Vajo
- Bogdan Diklić as Lazar Maraš
- Jovana Stojiljković as Sofija
- Aleksandar Berček as Crveni
- Nela Mihajlović as Ljubica (ep. 1-4)
- Anita Mančić as Ljubica (ep. 5-14)
- Jasna Đuričić as Anđela Maraš
- Vuk Kostić as Sparta
- Aleksandar Gligorić as Kapućino
- Pasquale Esposito as Cesare
- Tamara Krcunović as Marija
- Mladen Sovilj as Drka
- Ivan Mihailović as Sine
- Srđan Žika Todorović as Jani
- Nikola Pejaković as Debeli
- Vahidin Prelić as inspector Papa

== Music ==
The whole soundtrack for South Wind was done by the Belgrade-based record label Basiviti.

1. "4 strane sveta" (Serbian: 4 стране света, lit. '4 Sides of the World') – Coby feat. Senidah
2. "Pazi se" (Serbian: Пази се, lit. 'Watch Out') – Jovana Nikolić feat. Coby

== Reception ==
South Wind was the most-watched Serbian television series in 2020, with an average viewership share of 35.5%.
