= Gurjeet Singh =

English actor (born 1994)

- Born: Gurjeet Trojan Singh; 26 November 1994 (age 31); Manchester, England
- Occupation: Actor
- Years active: 2015–present
- Television: Ackley Bridge; Mrs Sidhu Investigates; Hotel Portofino

Gurjeet Trojan Singh (born 26 November 1994) is an British actor. He portrayed Naveed Haider in the Channel 4 series Ackley Bridge (2017–2019). Aside from his role as Naveed, he has appeared in series including Three Girls (2017), Mrs Sidhu Investigates (2023) and Hotel Portofino (2024). As well as his television roles, Singh has also starred in various theatre productions, including Hobson's Choice (2019), The Importance of Being Earnest (2021), East is East (2021) and No Pay? No Way! (2023).

== Life and career ==
=== 1994–2019: Early work and breakthrough ===
Gurjeet Trojan Singh was born on 26 November 1994 in Manchester. He had a passion for acting since primary school and went on to study performing arts at college. He auditioned for a drama school and has stated he "got close" but did not get accepted. He got signed to an agent following his final college showcase and auditioned for roles with the National Theatre. They noticed his lack of professional training and declined him, advising him to train. Singh then trained with the Royal Exchange's Young Company, as well as joining NWTAC, a theatre group. Whilst working at a post office, he received a call from his agent, who informed him that the National Theatre wanted to invite him for an audition. He then made his professional acting debut in their 2015 production of Dara. Singh then appeared in the 2016 film 31st October. He then made various screen appearances, including an episode of Comedy Playhouse, the 2016 film 25 Kille and an episode of the BBC Three drama series Three Girls.

In 2017, Singh appeared in Goth Weekend at the Live Theatre Company, as well as starring in Hull Truck Theatre's production of A Christmas Carol. Later in 2017, Singh appeared in his first high-profile role when he was cast in the Channel 4 school drama series Ackley Bridge. He was cast as Naveed Haider, a gay Muslim student. At the time of his casting, Singh had left school years prior, and found it fun "putting on a school uniform again and becoming a mischievous student". His character was involved in a popular storyline that centred on the romantic developments between him and Cory Wilson (Sam Retford). Singh left his role as Naveed after the conclusion of the third series.

=== 2019–present: Stage and television roles ===
In 2019, whilst also filming for Ackley Bridge, he portrayed Tarig in the ITV1 crime drama series The Bay. He had auditioned for a different role but was not chosen, later receiving a call to instead play Tarig. Singh then returned to the stage. He portrayed Robbie Singh in a 2019 production of Hobson's Choice at the Royal Exchange Theatre, where he trained. The Manchester Evening News praised his comedic delivery in the play. A year later, he starred in Wuthering Heights, also at the Royal Exchange. Singh then portrayed Jamil in The Importance of Being Earnest at the Lawrence Batley Theatre in 2021, which went on to be a digitised film. Later in 2021

In 2021, Singh was cast in the Birmingham Repertory Theatre's production of East is East. Then in 2023, he starred in the Acorn TV mystery crime series Mrs Sidhu Investigates as Tez Sidhu. Singh also returned to the Royal Exchange that year for their production of No Pay? No Way!, in which he played Luigi. WhatsOnStage praised his chemistry with co-star Roger Morlidge. In 2024, he was made a board member of the Royal Exchange, as well as leading workshops for the company. He also portrayed Raheel in the Royal Court Theatre's production of Expendable. Later that year, he appeared in the recurring role of Virat Sengupta in the third series of the BritBox period drama Hotel Portofino.

== Filmography ==
Year	Title	Role	Notes
2016	31st October		Film
2016	Comedy Playhouse	Raz	Episode: "Broken Biscuits"
2016	25 Kille		Film
2017	Three Girls	Ali	Guest role
2017–2019	Ackley Bridge	Naveed Haider	Main role
2018	Gamer	Nazgore	Short film
2019	The Bay	Tarig	Guest role
2021	The Importance of Being Earnest	Jamil	Film
2023	Mrs Sidhu Investigates	Tez Sidhu	Main role
2024	Hotel Portofino	Virat Sengupta	Recurring role
2025	Magid / Zafar	Zafar	Short film
2026	Grace	Devan Siddiqui	Episode: "Left you dead"
2026	The Northumbria Mysteries	DS Raj Singh	Upcoming detective drama series
2026	Ghosts: The Possession of Button House	P.C. Coulter	Film

== Stage ==
Year	Title	Role	Venue	Ref.
2015	Dara	Malik's Watchman	National Theatre Live	
2017	Goth Weekend	Simon	Live Theatre Company	
2017	A Christmas Carol	Dick Wilkins/Topper	Hull Truck Theatre	
2019	Hobson's Choice	Robbie Singh	Royal Exchange Theatre	
2019	The Manchester Project at Christmas	Various	HOME Theatre	
2020	Wuthering Heights	Hindley	Royal Exchange Theatre	
2021	The Importance of Being Earnest	Jamil	Lawrence Batley Theatre	
2021	East is East	Tariq	Birmingham Repertory Theatre	
2023	No Pay? No Way!	Luigi	Royal Exchange Theatre	
2024	Expendable	Raheel	Royal Court Theatre	
