= No One's Child =

- Film poster
- Directed by: Vuk Ršumović
- Written by: Vuk Ršumović
- Produced by: Miroslav Mogorovich
- Starring: Denis Muric; Pavle Čemerikić
- Cinematography: Damjan Radovanovič
- Edited by: Mirko Bojović
- Music by: Jura Ferina; Pavao Miholjević
- Release dates: 4 September 2014 (VFF); 8 April 2015 (Serbia)
- Running time: 95 minutes
- Countries: Serbia; Croatia
- Language: Serbian

No One's Child (Serbian: Ничије дете; Ničije dete) is a 2014 Serbian drama film directed by Vuk Ršumović. It was one of six films shortlisted by Serbia to be their submission for the Academy Award for Best Foreign Language Film at the 88th Academy Awards, but it lost out to Enclave.

== Cast ==
- Denis Murić - Haris Pućurica Pućke
- Pavle Čemerikić - Zika
- Isidora Janković - Alisa
- Miloš Timotijević - Vaspitač Ilke
