= Maja Miloš =

Serbian film director and screenwriter (born 1983)

- Born: 16 May 1983 (age 43); Belgrade, SFR Yugoslavia
- Occupations: Film director Screenwriter
- Years active: 1997–present

Maja Miloš (Serbian Cyrillic: Маја Милош) (born 16 May 1983) is a Serbian film director and screenwriter. She is most notable for creating the 2012 movie Clip.

== Selected filmography ==
- Si Tu Timazin (2004)
- Clip (2012)
- No Fairy Dust (2026)
