= Dovlatov (film) =

- Theatrical release poster
- Directed by: Aleksei German Jr
- Screenplay by: Aleksei German Jr; Yuliya Tupikina
- Produced by: Andrey Savelev; Artyom Vasilev; Konstantin Ernst; Dariusz Jablonski
- Starring: Milan Marić; Danila Kozlovsky; Helena Sujecka; Artur Beschastny; Anton Shagin; Svetlana Khodchenkova; Elena Lyadova
- Cinematography: Łukasz Żal
- Production companies: Art and Pop Corn; Metrafilms; SAGa
- Distributed by: WDSSPR(Russia) Netflix(United States)
- Release date: 17 February 2018 (Berlin)
- Running time: 126 minutes
- Country: Russia
- Language: Russian

Dovlatov (Russian: Довлатов) is a 2018 Russian biographical film about writer Sergei Dovlatov, directed by Aleksei German and starring Milan Marić and Danila Kozlovsky. It premiered at the 2018 Berlin International Film Festival in competition on 17 February, where it was awarded a Silver Bear for Outstanding Artistic Contribution for costume and production design. It received generally positive reviews from critics.

== Plot ==
The film tells about a few days in the life of writer Sergei Dovlatov (Milan Marić) in 1971 Leningrad, on the eve of the emigration of his friend, the future Nobel laureate Joseph Brodsky (Artur Beschastny). Sergei is determined to stay and lead a normal life with his wife Elena (Helena Sujecka) and daughter Katya (Eva Herr). Dovlatov's manuscripts are regularly rejected by the official media as his point of view is deemed undesirable. His friend is an artist, David (Danila Kozlovsky), a fartsovshchik who sells foreign goods on the black market. During this time, Sergei tries to buy his daughter a German doll but is not able to find one anywhere.

== Cast ==
- Milan Marić as Sergei Dovlatov
- Danila Kozlovsky as David
- Helena Sujecka as Elena Dovlatova
- Eva Herr as Katya Dovlatova
- Artur Beschastny as Joseph Brodsky
- Anton Shagin as Anton Kuznetsov
- Svetlana Khodchenkova as actress, Dovlatov's girlfriend
- Elena Lyadova as young editor
- Igor Mityushkin as Sholom Schwartz
- Piotr Gąsowski as Semyon Alexandrovich
- Tamara Oganesyan as Nora Dovlatova
- Denis Shlenkov as site manager

== Reception ==
On review aggregator Rotten Tomatoes, the film holds an approval rating of 80%, based on 15 reviews with an average rating of 6.1/10. Metacritic gives the film a weighted average score of 68 out of 100, based on 8 critics, indicating "generally favorable reviews".
