= Danijel Sraka =

Slovenian film director and producer (born 1975)

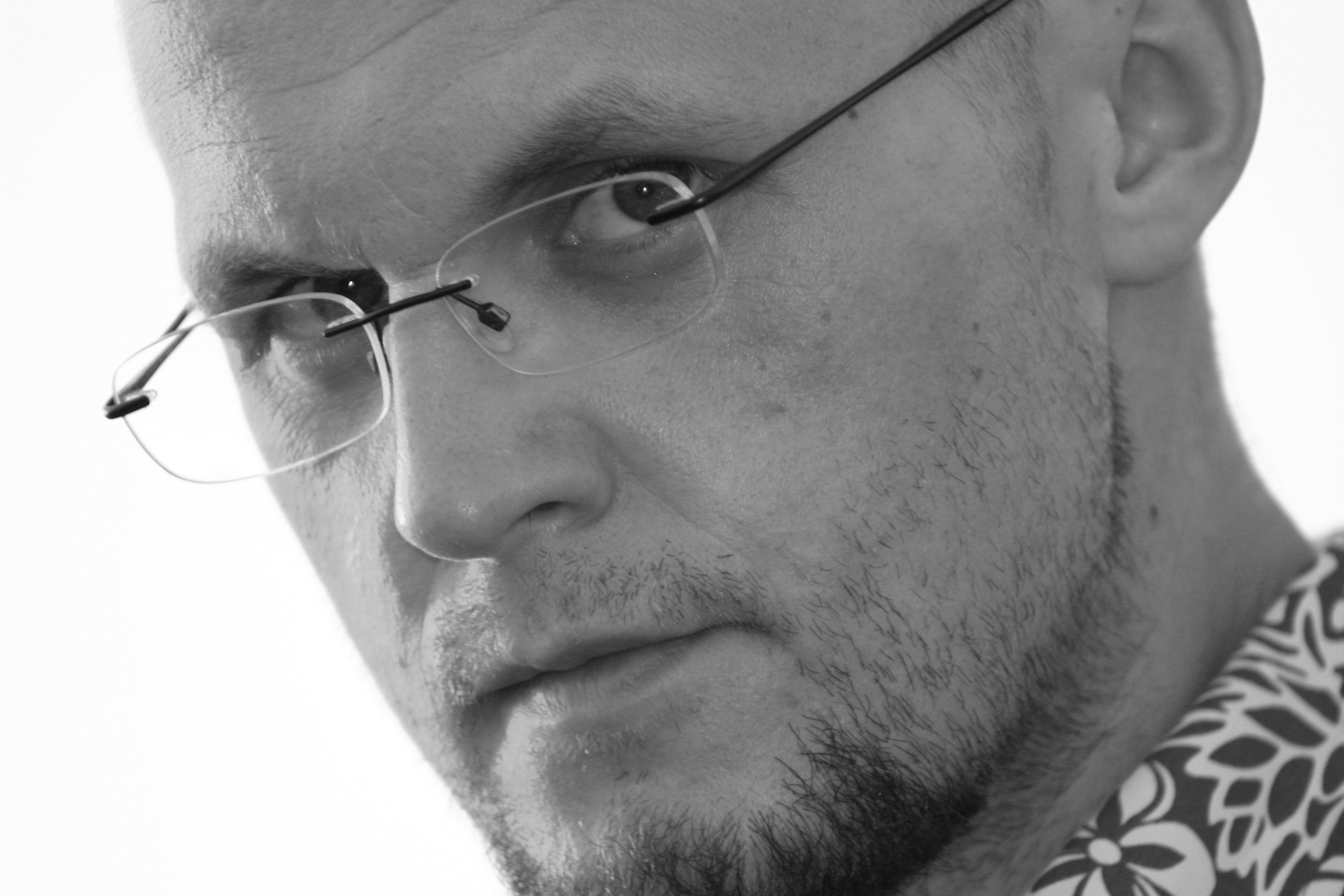
- Born: Danijel Sraka; 22 December 1975 (age 49); Ljubljana, Slovenia
- Years active: 1997–present
- Spouse: Vesna Hocevar (2009–present)

Danijel Sraka (born 22 December 1975) is a Slovenian film director and producer. Sraka directed his first feature film, Friday Night (V Petek Zvecer), at age 22 (film shot in 1998, released in 2000).

In 2001, he established (with Slovenian actor Jernej Kuntner) the first Slovenian stand-up comedy club and show, Nove zvezde komedije.

His first collection of poems entitled Logos Via Ljubezen (Logos Via Love) was published in 1995.

Graduated with honors from Brooks Institute of Photography in 2007. Graduated from AFI Conservatory with MFA degree in Producing in 2009. He further polished his skills at TV production company Prospect Park and feature film production company Mace Neufeld Productions.

Nowadays, Danijel pursues his dreams as producer and director at a production company Vindicated Dream. He is also a producer and partner at Primo Pictures Entertainment, a multiplatform entertainment company. Primo Pictures Entertainment's current slate of projects include a lost-in-translation drama set in Beijing "Coffee & Tea," a coming of age dramedy "Pancake's Wedding," and a fantasy feature film Fearless Boy.

Lives in Los Angeles, CA, with his wife, theater director and producer, Vesna Hocevar.

== Filmography ==
=== Director ===
- 2009 - Balicanni, short film
- 2009 - Summer Camp, short film
- 2009 - Room 337, short film
- 2006 - Filming Jefferey, feature documentary (in post-production)
- 2005 - Anniversary, short film
- 2004 - Chasing the UFOs, short documentary film
- 2004 - Lost Souls, short film
- 2000 - Friday Night (V Petek Zvecer), feature film
- 1998 - Renaissance, short film

=== Producer ===
- 2011 - Coffee & Tea, feature film (in pre-production)
- 2011 - Pancake's Wedding, feature film (in pre-production)
- 2011 - Warriors, short film
- 2010/11 - The Dog and the Duck, feature documentary
- 2010 - Lost Girl, short film
- 2009 - Balicanni, short film
- 2009 - Summer Camp, short film
- 2009 - Echoes, short film
- 2008 - Coal For Cole, short film
- 2006 - Filming Jefferey, feature documentary (in post-production)
- 2000 - Friday Night (V Petek Zvecer), feature film

=== Writer ===
- 2009 - Balicanni, short film
- 2009 - Summer Camp, short film
- 2005 - Anniversary, short film
- 1998 - Renaissance, short film
