= The Hornet =

The Hornet; Stršljen
- Directed by: Gorčin Stojanović
- Starring: Sergej Trifunović; Mirjana Joković
- Release date: 24 February 1998
- Running time: 107 min
- Country: FR Yugoslavia
- Languages: Serbian; Albanian; English

The Hornet (Stršljen) is a 1998 Serbian drama film directed by Gorčin Stojanovic.

== Cast ==
- Sergej Trifunović – Miljaim
- Mirjana Joković – Adrijana
- Dragan Jovanović – Inspektor Boban Đorđević
- Branimir Popović – Abaz
- Meto Jovanovski – Avdija
- Ljubiša Samardžić – Profesor Lane Šekularac
- Enver Petrovci – Salih
- Mirko Vlahović – Redžepi
- Dragan Petrović – Inspektor Peter Helmer
- Miloš Timotijević – Emin
- Dragan Maksimović – Azem
- Vojin Ćetković – Taxi driver
