= Stevan Filipović (film director) =

Serbian film director and editor

- Стеван Филиповић
- Born: 1981 (age 44–45); Belgrade, SR Serbia, SFR Yugoslavia
- Education: University of Arts in Belgrade
- Occupations: Editor; director; lecturer
- Years active: 2002–present

Stevan Filipović (Serbian Cyrillic: Стеван Филиповић; born 1981) is a Serbian film editor, director and lecturer.

== Biography ==
Best known for his box-office successes, such as Šejtanov ratnik (2006), Skinning (2010) and Next to Me (2015), he is recognized for depicting social commentary through elements of fantasy. In addition to his creative work, Filipović also served as an assistant lecturer to the class of actress Mirjana Karanović at the University of Arts in Belgrade, between 2012 and 2014. Subsequently, he started teaching fundamentals of visual effects and digital postproduction at the University.

He has received a number of national accolades as well as regional ones, including a grand prix at the Pula Film Festival.

In December 2021, Filipović came out as gay on Twitter.

== Selected filmography ==
- Šejtanov ratnik (2006)
- Skinning (2010)
- Urgentni centar (2014–15); 3 episodes
- Next to Me (2015)
- A Good Wife (2016)
- Next To Me The Musical
- Breaking Point: A Star Wars Story (2019)
- Next To You (2023)
- Next To Us (2024)

== Selected accolades ==
Awards and nominations received by Lady Gaga
Award	Year	Recipient(s)	Category	Result	Ref.
FEST International Film Festival	2016	Next to Me	Jury Prize - Best Film	Won	
FEST International Film Festival	2016	Next to Me	Jury Prize - National Program	Won	
FEST International Film Festival	2016	Next to Me	FEDEORA Jury Award	Won	
Grossmann Fantastic Film and Wine Festival	2006	Šejtanov ratnik	Hudi Mačak Award	Won	
Grossmann Fantastic Film and Wine Festival	2010	Skinning	Special Jury Mention	Won	
Pula Film Festival	2015	Next to Me	Golden Arena	Won	
Sarajevo Film Festival	2015	Next to Me	Young Audience Award	Won	
Festival International du Film Fantastique de Menton	2020	Breaking Point: A Star Wars Story	Special Prize of the jury Award	Won	

== Recent activity ==
In 2017, Stevan Filipović has signed the Declaration on the Common Language of the Croats, Serbs, Bosniaks and Montenegrins.
