= The Northumbria Mysteries =

British television series

- Genre: Crime drama
- Directed by: Gordon Anderson; Duncan Foster
- Starring: Robson Green; Liz White; Gurjeet Singh
- Country of origin: United Kingdom
- Original language: English
- No. of series: 1
- No. of episodes: 8

Production
- Executive producers: Aschlin Ditta; Gordon Anderson; Chris Gascoyne; Helen Munson
- Producer: Lesley Douglas
- Running time: 42 minutes
- Production company: Lonesome Pine Productions

Original release
- Network: BBC One
- Release: 23 October 2026 – present

The Northumbria Mysteries is a British crime drama television series starring Robson Green, Liz White, and Gurjeet Singh. The series premiered on BBC One on 23 October 2026.

== Premise ==
An odd-couple crime-solving partnership forms in North East England between an Oxford-educated police woman and a local man with an inauspicious past.

== Cast and characters ==
- Robson Green as Joe Ruby
- Liz White as DI Rose O'Connell
- Gurjeet Singh as DS Raj Singh
- Simon Callow as the Prior, Father David
- Chris Gascoyne as 'Ace' Dawson
- Damola Adelaja as Brother Christopher Akintola
- Alex Croft as Brother Mark Bancroft
- Craig Pearson
- Charlotte Jordan as Maxine Gray
- Paula Wilcox as Lady Philippa Armstrong
- Nicole Evans as Louise Bentley

== Production ==
Produced by Lonesome Pine Productions, the series was commissioned by the BBC in March 2026. It is directed by Gordon Anderson and Duncan Foster and produced by Lesley Douglas. Aschlin Ditta, Gordon Anderson and Chris Gascoyne are Executive Producers for Lonesome Pine, with Helen Munson for the BBC.

The series is starring Robson Green, Liz White and Gurjeet Singh. Green described his character as an ex-con who is "seeking redemption" and someone that has "always been lured into temptation despite having a good heart and wanting to do the right thing", and likened the character to Robby Box played by Ray Brooks in 1980s television series Big Deal. The cast also includes Simon Callow, Craig Pearson, Chris Gascoyne and Alex Croft.

Production was underway by April 2026. The priory scenes were filmed at Brinkburn Priory, a Grade I listed English Heritage property, other filming locations in Northumbria included Dunstanburgh Castle as well as in Alnwick, Amble, Seahouses, Morpeth and Rothbury.

== Broadcast ==
The Northumbria Mysteries premiered on BBC One on 23 October 2026 with all episodes also releasing on BBC iPlayer.
