= Friday Night (2000 film) =

- Directed by: Danijel Sraka
- Written by: Beno 'Stef' Torkar
- Produced by: Ales Blatnik; Danijel Sraka
- Starring: Primoz Rokavc; Katarina Čas; Tadej Cepeljnik; Primoz Preksavec
- Edited by: Morena Fortuna
- Release date: 31 March 2000
- Running time: 89 minutes
- Country: Slovenia

Friday Night (Slovene: V petek zvečer) is a Slovenian low-budget film that premiered in theaters across Slovenia in 2000. Directed by Danijel Sraka; written by Beno 'Stef' Torkar; produced by Ales Blatnik and Danijel Sraka. The film received extensive media coverage in Slovenia during filming as a result of being privately financed and having an international crew when most films from the area were dependent on state funds and local workers.

The crew members brought in from abroad were Mikael Karlmark from Sweden, Roy Kurtluyan from Turkey/United States, Donald L. Painchaud from Canada and James Debbs from the United States.

== Summary ==
High school friends Edi, Marko, Katja, Mateja, and Petra are trying to find their way to graduation. Along the way they encounter extremely hostile teachers, offensive policemen, insane parents, and at one point aliens (?!). Will they succeed in reaching their goal: the ultimate 'be here or die' party?

== Film information ==
=== Cast ===
- Primož Rokavc
- Katarina Čas
- Tadej Cepeljnik
- Primož Preksavec
- Tina Cvek
- Manja Plesnar
- Mateja Dominko
- Ales Drolc
- Jernej Kuntner
- Jasna Kuljaj
- Vesna Strehar
- Matej Kralj
- Polona Fabic
- Mladen Bucic
- Roman Zun
- Zoran Smiljanic
- Max Modic
- Drago Razborsek
- Breda Omerza
- Danijel Smon
- Jože Vunsek
- Sonja Pantar
- Andrija Hevka
- Bostjan Regulj
- Marcel Stefancic
- Simona Habic
- Jozef Jarh
- Tomaž Cedilnik
