= Jatagan Mala =

Jatagan Mala Јатаган мала
- Urban neighbourhood
- Location within Belgrade
- Coordinates: 44.79653°N 20.45557°E
- Country: Serbia
- Region: Belgrade
- Municipality: Savski Venac
- Time zone: UTC+1 (CET)
  - Summer (DST): UTC+2 (CEST)
- Area code: +381(0)11
- Car plates: BG

Jatagan Mala (Serbian: Јатаган мала) is a former urban neighborhood of Belgrade, the capital of Serbia. It existed from 1919 to 1961 and was located in the municipality of Savski Venac. Jatagan Mala became a point of media interest in 2017 with the broadcast of TV serial Shadows over Balkan, which was partially located in Jatagan Mala during the Interbellum.

== Location ==
Jatagan Mala was situated some 5 km (3 mi) south of downtown Belgrade, east of the Sava river. It originated on the location where the modern headquarters of the Medical Emergency Office (Hitna pomoć) is, below the "Višegradska" Maternity Hospital. In time, it expanded occupying the entire slope between the Sarajevska Street on the west and Autokomanda on the east, stretching above the Kragujevac road, modern Franše d'Еpere section of the highway. It occupied roughly the area across the present neighborhoods of Mostar and Prokop, on the northern slopes of Topčidersko Brdo.

== History ==
The name of the neighborhood derives from two words in Turkish, jatagan (short sword or sabre, Turkish yatagan, dagger) and ma[ha]la (Turkish mahalle, neighborhood), meaning "sword neighborhood".

Belgrade was left battered after the World War I and Austro-Hungarian and German occupation. There was a major lack of dwellings and large number of internal migrants from the rest of Serbia poured into the capital searching for jobs. Many squatted in abandoned and torn-down dwellings. The neighborhood was established in the late 1919. A group of citizens who had been expelled from their illegal residences built the first shanty houses. The area that they occupied was a municipal lot, but was not urbanized at all and was overgrown with weeds and shrubs. The settlement grew constantly and soon became notorious for the prostitution, gambling, robbing, brawls, etc., and even the police hesitated to enforce the law and order in Jatagan Mala.

Jatagan Mala was a typical shanty town. The dwellings were all small, but built in various "styles" and from all sorts of materials. There were half-dugouts, shanties built of adobe or tin sheets, etc. Still, the streets developed in the settlement and there were grocery and craft shops. As a curiosity, Jatagan Mala had electricity, which was very expensive then. In time, some of the wealthier settlers built big palaces from proper, hard materials. By the late 1920s the settlement had 300 houses and over 1,000 people. At that time the first attempt at demolishing the settlement occurred, in the joint action of the police and firemen.

Efforts to demolish Jatagan Mala resumed in several partial actions, but it continued to grow nevertheless: "new shanty houses are constantly built, so often an inhabitant of Jatagan Mala, when he gets up in the morning, sees a new, someone else's house in his yard". In 1933 the police demolished one part of the settlement. In 1938, it had 5,000 inhabitants, and the major section of the settlement, between modern interchanges of Autokomanda and Mostar, was demolished that year. City administration constructed "Worker's colony", a barracks settlement in the Severni bulevar street, in the neighborhood of Zvezdara, to relocate settlers of Jatagan Mala, but the outbreak of the war put the project on hold. Still, the largest part was demolished in 1939–40, when 450 houses were razed to the ground, and the inhabitants were forcibly resettled to Marinkova Bara.

There was a permanent circus in the neighborhood. One of the attractions was a 6 metres (20 ft) long baby whale. After it died in 1936, the carcass was purchased by Vladeta Simić, professor at the University of Belgrade's Veterinary Faculty. It turned out that it was actually a fully grown beaked whale. Simić exhibited whale's skeleton as the first item in the faculty's Museum of Anatomy.

A temporary facility, which hosted the University of Belgrade's Faculty of Veterinary Medicine, was set in the neighborhood in 1936, when the faculty was established. Present faculty's building was finished in 1948, above the neighborhood. When construction of the new highway through Belgrade began in 1960s, population of Jatagan Mala was dislocated into the newly constructed residential blocks of New Belgrade across the Sava and the neighborhood was demolished to make way for the interchange of Mostar and the still not completely finished Belgrade Centre railway station, colloquially called Prokop.

Among his first, amateur films, film director Dušan Makavejev made a movie Jatagan Mala in 1953. It was described as an original, insightful and provocative debunking of the big city's backside. The settlement was completely demolished by 1961, in the process of city beautification due to the First Summit of the Non-Aligned countries. The inhabitants were resettled into the neighborhood of Ledine.

== Romani ==
Though the settlement developed after World War I, settling of the Romani people in the area was already recorded in the 19th century.

It was a poor, neglected neighborhood inhabited by the Romani people and by today's standards it would probably be classified as an informal settlement. Ironically, it bordered two wealthiest neighborhoods of Belgrade, Senjak and Dedinje.

The case of Jatagan Mala is today often cited as a successful way of handling informal settlements problems (regarding today existing similar settlements like Kartonsko naselje, Deponija, etc.), but no proper study was ever made how fully the Romani population was really integrated.
