= Vlasta Velisavljević =

Serbian actor (1926–2021)

- Власта Велисављевић
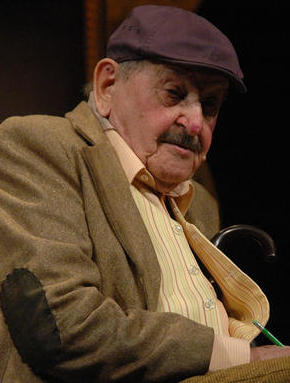
- Velisavljević in October 2013
- Born: 28 July 1926; Belgrade, Kingdom of Serbs, Croats and Slovenes
- Died: 24 March 2021 (aged 94); Belgrade, Serbia
- Burial place: New Cemetery, Belgrade
- Occupation: Actor
- Years active: 1938–2021

Vlastimir "Vlasta" Velisavljević (Serbian Cyrillic: Властимир "Власта" Велисављевић; 28 July 1926 – 24 March 2021) was a Serbian actor.

== Death ==
Velisavljević died from complications caused by COVID-19 on 24 March 2021, in Belgrade. He was 94. He was buried on 27 March 2021, at the Alley of Distinguished Citizens at the New Cemetery in Belgrade.
