= Slivnica, Resen =

Slivnica Сливница
- Village
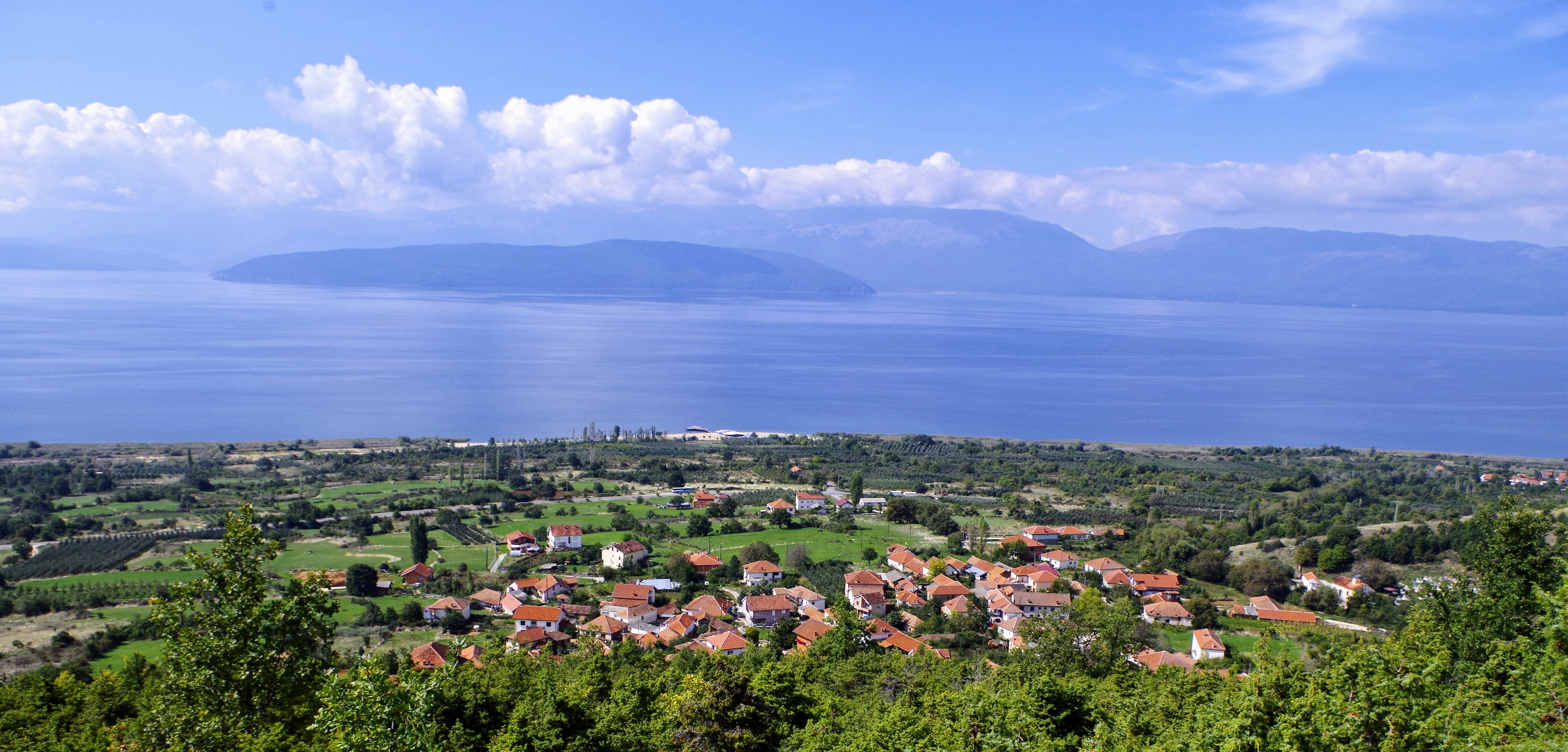
- Panoramic view of the village Slivnica, in the background is Lake Prespa

- Location within North Macedonia
- Coordinates: 40°57′32″N 21°04′53″E
- Country: North Macedonia
- Region: Pelagonia
- Municipality: Resen

Population (2002)
  - Total: 188
- Time zone: UTC+1 (CET)
  - Summer (DST): UTC+2 (CEST)
- Area code: +389
- Car plates: RE

Slivnica (Macedonian: Сливница) is a village on the eastern shore of Lake Prespa in the Resen Municipality of the Republic of North Macedonia. It is located under 16 kilometres (9.9 mi) south of the municipal centre of Resen.

== Demographics ==
Slivnica is inhabited by Orthodox Macedonians. During the late Ottoman period, Torbeš also used to reside in Slivnica. In the statistics of Bulgarian ethnographer Vasil Kanchov from 1900, Slivnica had 126 inhabitants with 120 being Bulgarian Christians and 6 being Bulgarian Muslims.

Slivnica has a population of 188 people. It is one of only four villages in Resen Municipality that saw a population increase from the 1994 census to the most recent one in 2002.

Ethnic group	census 1961		census 1971		census 1981		census 1991		census 1994		census 2002	
Ethnic group	Number	%	Number	%	Number	%	Number	%	Number	%	Number	%
Macedonians	310	100.0	265	99.6	309	95.7	207	99.5	166	100.0	188	100.0
others	0	0.0	1	0.4	14	4.3	1	0.5	0	0.0	0	0.0
Total	310		266		323		208		166		188	
