= North Macedonia Film Agency =

The North Macedonia Film Agency, also known as the Film Fund, is a governmental agency in North Macedonia established in 2006 to help, support, and contribute to the North Macedonia film industry. Formed by the Government of North Macedonia, the Film Fund is a legal entity under The Law for the Film Fund and its registered office is located in Skopje, officially beginning work in 2008. The agency's purpose is to provide artistic and financial support to film projects inside North Macedonia, or made by Macedonian filmmakers. It provides resources to studios and independent filmmakers in North Macedonia and has control over cinemas and film festivals.
