= Panama (2015 film) =

2015 film

- Directed by: Pavle Vučković
- Written by: Pavle Vučković; Jelena Vuksanović
- Starring: Slaven Doslo; Jovana Stojiljković
- Cinematography: Djordje Arambasic
- Edited by: Bojan Kosović
- Release date: May 2015 (Cannes)
- Running time: 105 minutes
- Country: Serbia
- Language: Serbian

Panama is a 2015 Serbian drama film directed by Pavle Vučković. It has been selected to screen in the Special Screenings section at the 2015 Cannes Film Festival.

== Cast ==
- Slaven Doslo as Jovan
- Jovana Stojiljković as Maja
- Biljana Mišić as Sanja
- Jelisaveta Orašanin as Milica
- Nebojša Milovanović as Professor
- Tamara Dragičević as Sandra
- Miloš Pjevač as Milan
