= Dragan Petrović =

Serbian actor

- Born: 17 December 1961 (age 64); Belgrade, PR Serbia, FPR Yugoslavia
- Occupation: Actor
- Years active: 1978-present

Dragan Petrović (born 17 December 1961) is a Serbian actor. He has appeared in more than seventy films since 1978. He teaches at the University of Arts in Belgrade.

== Selected filmography ==
Year	Title	Role	Notes
1996	Pretty Village, Pretty Flame	Laza	
1998	The Hornet	Inspektor Peter Helmer	
2001	Absolute 100	Neške	
2007	The Fourth Man	Politicar	
2014	The Man Who Defended Gavrilo Princip	Sudija Kurinaldi	

Andrija i Andjelka 2016 kao Zvonko Trtić - Zvonce
