= The British Family =

The British Family (a.k.a. Bradshaws) are a family from Westerham, Kent in the United Kingdom who have become consumer champions for the promotion of British manufacturing and farming. James and Emily Bradshaw, along with their son Lucan, first rose to prominence in January 2013 with their challenge to buy only British goods and services. Various exploits of the family to promote British manufacturing have been widely publicized since. The family also organised the British Family Fayre event in Kent which was a country-fair-themed festival of British manufacturing and farming. James Bradshaw was a founder director of the Made in Britain (campaign).
