= Miodrag Radonjić =

Serbian actor (born 1989)

- Миодраг Радоњић
- Born: 3 May 1989 (age 36); Belgrade, Yugoslavia
- Citizenship: Serbian
- Occupation: Actor
- Years active: 2010–present

Miodrag Radonjić (Serbian: Миодраг Радоњић, born 3 May 1989) is a Serbian actor and film producer.

== Life and career ==
Radonjić was born on 3 May 1989 in Belgrade, Yugoslavia. His mother was a musician, having won an accordion competition in their homeland. He has a younger brother named Marko. At the age of eighteen, Radonjić graduated the University of Belgrade, Faculty of Dramatic Arts. He made his acting debut in 2010 with the comedy film New Chance (Serbian: Нова шанса, romanized: Nova Chansa). Radonjić graduated from the Department of Acting in 2015.

Radonjić is married to psychologist Milica Mikić and has two children. In 2023, he became a member of Belgrade Drama Theatre.

== Filmography ==
=== TV series ===
Year	Film	Role	Ref.
2012	Military Academy	Chief of the brick	
2015	Čizmaši	Stevica Todorović	
2017	Bozicni ustanak	Danilo	
2020	South Wind	Baća	
