= Andrija i Anđelka =

Serbian television series

- Genre: Comedy
- Based on: Un gars, une fille by Guy A. Lepage
- Written by: Danilo Bećković; Marko Manojlović; Vlada Aleksić
- Starring: Andrija Milošević; Anđelka Prpić
- Country of origin: Serbia
- Original language: Serbian
- No. of seasons: 3
- No. of episodes: 164

Production
- Producers: Zorana Popović; Filip Đorđić
- Camera setup: Bojana Andrić
- Running time: 30 minutes

Original release
- Network: Prva Srpska Televizija
- Release: October 5, 2015 – October 28, 2016

Andrija i Anđelka (Serbian Cyrillic: Андрија и Анђелка, lit. 'Andrija and Anđelka') is a Serbian comedy series that was broadcast on Prva Srpska Televizija between 5 October 2015, and 13 June 2016. It is based on the Quebec comedy television series Un gars, une fille.
