= Humidity (film) =

2016 film

- Film poster
- Directed by: Nikola Ljuca
- Written by: Nikola Ljuca; Stasa Bajac
- Starring: Miloš Timotijević
- Release dates: 15 February 2016 (Berlin); 3 March 2016 (Serbia)
- Running time: 113 minutes
- Country: Serbia
- Language: Serbian

Humidity (Serbian: Vlažnost) is a 2016 Serbian drama film directed by Nikola Ljuca. It was named as one of five films that could be chosen as the Serbian submission for the Best Foreign Language Film at the 89th Academy Awards, but it was not selected.

== Cast ==
- Miloš Timotijević as Petar
- Tamara Krcunović as Mina
- Maria Kraakman as Karin
- Slaven Došlo as Milan
- Dragan Bakema as Srdjan
- Katarina Marković as Bojana
