= Pasquale Esposito (actor) =

Italian actor and director

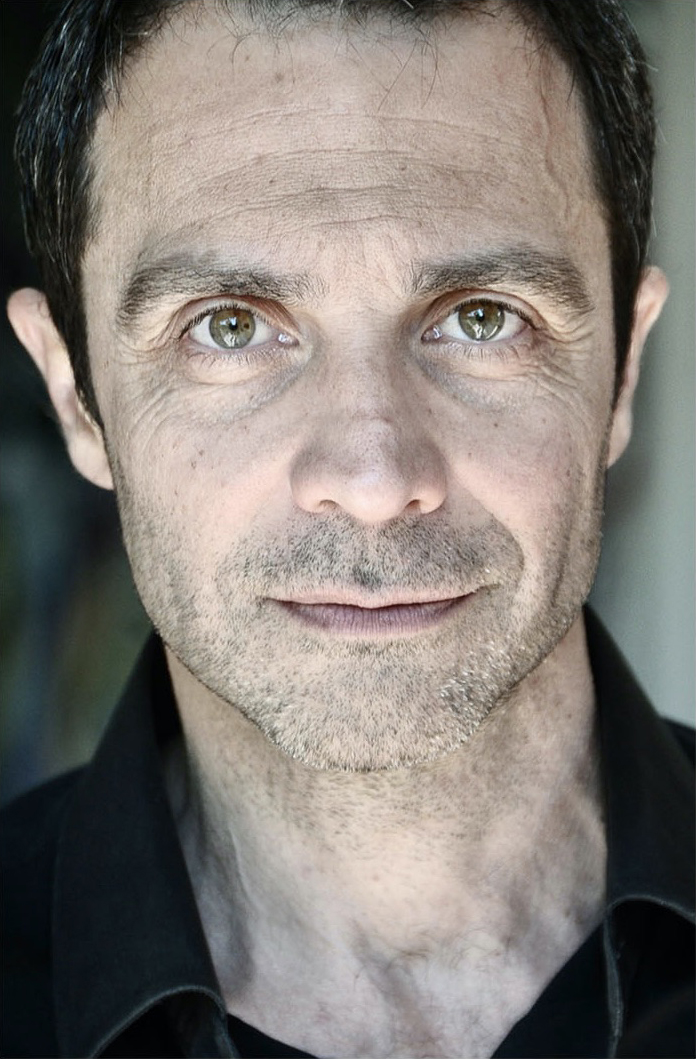
- Occupation: Actor
- Years active: 1978–present

Pasquale Esposito is an Italian actor, writer and director. His way of approaching acting has been shaped by his vision and practice of Zen Buddhism. Esposito gained international recognition for his role in the third season of the acclaimed TV series Gomorrah (Sky Atlantic). This success led to him being cast in other international productions such as Hotel Portofino (PBS), Industry (BBC-HBO), and Ripley (Netflix). Esposito received an award as “international actor” in the CINEMA category “six awards in search of an author” at the International Film Festival in Lenola (Latina) Italy.

== Career ==
Esposito began his acting education with different acting teachers from the Actors Studio, New York, such as Francesca De Sapio, Greta Seacat, Susan Batson and Dominique De Fazio, with whom he completed the 4 level training system of work that De Fazio initiated in his teaching and went on to teach for 4 years at the Studio De Fazio in Italy, Germany and Los Angeles.

Then the international break through happened with the TV Series Gomorrah – produced by Sky Italy and released on HBO Max in the US on Netflix in some countries (including US, Australia and New Zealand) and in 190 countries worldwide. The series has been described as Italy's most popular TV show based on the best selling book of the same name by journalist Roberto Saviano, Esposito plays one of the leading role in the third season. Esposito has also appeared in the TV series South Wind a Serbian Production (Juzni vetar) written and directed by Milos Avramovic.

He played a regular role in the British period drama TV Series Hotel Portofino for PBS (ITV - Foxtel - Sky Italy) starring Natasha McElhone. He played a fashion designer millionaire in the BBC production TV series Industry (TV series) second season for HBO and he is also in the drama TV series "Ripley", based on Patricia Highsmith's bestselling quintet of Tom Ripley novels, for Netflix. "Ripley” is directed by the Award-winning Steven Zaillian and starring as Ripley the BAFTA Award-winning Andrew Scott. Pasquale played a supporting role in the Italian feature film „Ciao bambino“ which won an award as the best first feature film at the Rome Film Festival 2024.

In 2008 Esposito directed an award-winning documentary play “Seven” about 7 female protagonists through their journey to freedom, at the Global WIN Conference (Women's International Networking) an independent global women's leadership organization) in Prague.

In 2015 he wrote, produced and directed the documentary In the right light about Kristin Engvig, founder and president of the Win Conference. The documentary was screened in London, Tokyo and Rome.

Esposito is the founder and art director of the "Research Company", which researches expression and communication and produces his own theatre, film productions and workshops. In October 2016, Esposito wrote, directed and performed a theatre play, A looking glass, in Munich at the Lotus Theater, with his company.

== Research activities ==
Esposito is the founder and artistic director of the „Research Company“. The company offers projects and workshops in the UK, Germany and Italy.

Esposito has been invited to the International Symposium on "Mindfulness and Performance" (June 2016) at the University of Huddersfield West Yorkshire, UK, to present “Zen in the Arts; expression and communication". He was also invited to the Symposium organized by Cardiff University (Nov.2016) on “Mindfulness Turn in Martial, Healing, and Performing Arts” to share his work on the nature of our own expression, an inquiry on our original self.

== Filmography ==
- 1978: Storie della Camorra (TV Mini-Series)
- 1991: Vento di mare (TV-Movie)
- 1995: Segreto di stato
- 1999: Ama il tuo nemico (TV-Movie)
- 2001: Concorrenza sleale
- 2001: Casa famiglia (TV Series)
- 2001: Scariest Places on Earth (TV Series)
- 2002: Vento di ponente (TV Series)
- 2004: Carabinieri (TV Series)
- 2004: Hidden Children
- 2004: A luci spente
- 2005: La squadra (TV Series)
- 2007: I bevitori di assenzio (Short)
- 2006 - 2008: Don Matteo (TV Series)
- 2009: Sisi (TV-Movie)
- 2009: Torturato (Short)
- 2009: Reflex (Short)
- 2010: When in Rome
- 2017: Gomorrah (TV series)
- 2019: South Wind (Južni Vetar) (TV series)
- 2021: Hotel Portofino (TV series)
- 2021: Industry (TV series)
- 2021: Ripley (TV series)
