= Next to Me (film) =

2015 film by Stevan Filipović

- Theatrical release poster
- Directed by: Stevan Filipović
- Starring: Hristina Popović; Mirjana Karanović
- Release dates: 20 July 2015 (PFF); 23 September 2015 (Serbia)
- Running time: 95 minutes
- Country: Serbia
- Language: Serbian

Next to Me (Serbian: Поред мене / Pored mene) is a 2015 Serbian drama film directed by Stevan Filipović.

== Plot ==
The story begins with a young and enthusiastic high school professor who is interested in alternative methods of education. Her fight is actually the fight against powerful people, who do not care about their jobs and responsibilities. She tries to convince the principal of the school to become more interested in her students. The professor is also married to the painter, whose latest exhibit causes strong reactions. Group of hooligans sees the exhibit as the reason to attack the professor. Afterwards she sees one of her students watching the video of her attack, and she realizes their involvement. She decides to take their mobile phones, and warn them about going to the police, if they do not tell her who are the attackers. After their negative reaction, she decides to lock them in school until they change their mind. In order to solve the problem, students start communicating with each other. The situation makes them realize that there are many things they do not know about each other.

== Cast ==
- Hristina Popović - History teacher Olja
- Mirjana Karanović - School headmaster
- Dragan Mićanović - Ugljesa
- Slaven Došlo - Lazar
- Nikola Glišić - Strahinja
- Joana Knezevic - Olja's friend
