= Miloš Timotijević =

Serbian actor

- Милош Тимотијевић
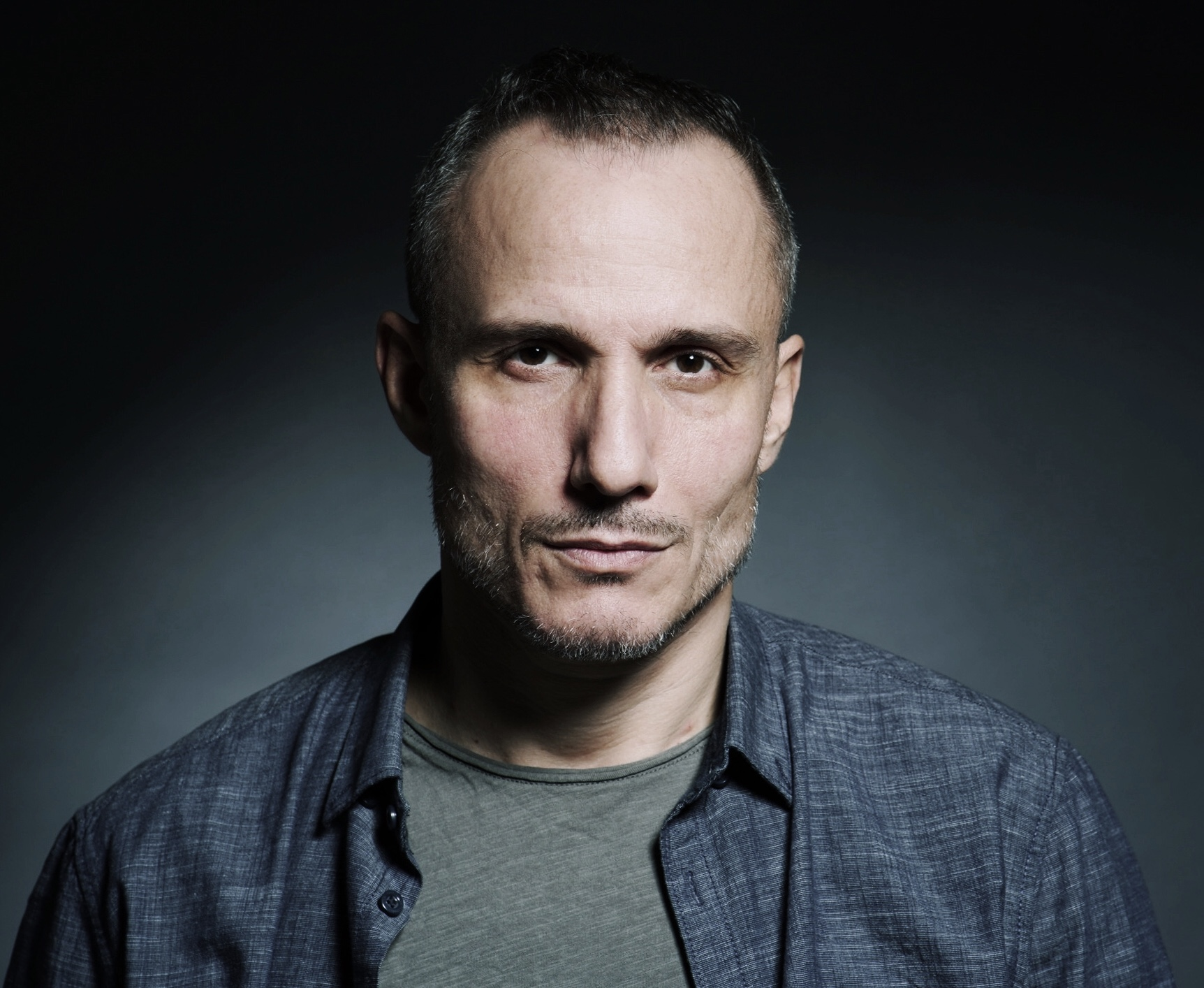
- Born: 9 March 1975 (age 51); Belgrade, SR Serbia, SFR Yugoslavia
- Occupation: Actor
- Years active: 1995–present

Miloš Timotijević (Serbian Cyrillic: Милош Тимотијевић; born 9 March 1975) is a Serbian actor. He has appeared in more than sixty films and TV series since 1995.

Miloš is best known for his roles in American war film In the Land of Blood and Honey (2011) by Angelina Jolie and in Serbian psychological drama Humidity, for which he won the Best Actor Award at the Belgrade International Film Festival in 2016. His most notable television works are crime thrillers South Wind (2020) and Besa (2019), as well as acclaimed Serbian mystery Black Sun (2017).

Since 2016 he has started to gain more media attention and praise of critics for most of his recent work.

== Early life ==
Miloš showed interest in acting in early age. During primary and high school, he was a member of the Drama Studio of Radio Television of Belgrade, led by Mika Aleksić. After graduating from the high school, he attended the Faculty of Dramatic Arts in Belgrade, where he graduated in the class of professors Milenko Maričić and Branislav Mićunović in 1999. His professional career started early during the studies.

== Career ==
=== 1994—2015: Beginning ===
His first appearance on big screen was in 1995, when he was 20, with an episodic role in the historical series The End of the Obrenović Dynasty (org. Kraj dinastije Obrenović). After that, numerous roles ensued in different genres in both domestic and foreign production.

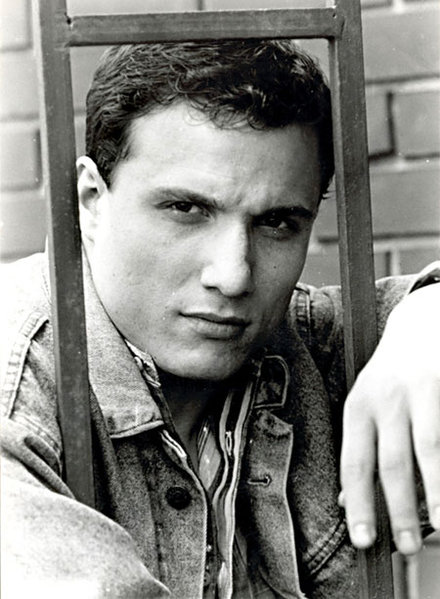
Photo of young Timotijević, taken by his father, Dragan Timotijević ″Belmondo″

The career start for Miloš wasn't easy, as it took almost 20 years to leave the supporting roles behind. Yet he said he was determined to become a real professional. Early in his career he got to be known as dedicated and disciplined actor. He trained hard for 27 days only to be able to play the role of a bodybuilder in Seven and a Half (org. Sedam i po). For the role of Emin in The Hornet (org. Stršljen) he took a course in Albanian. He went on playing in both commercial and independent projects, as well as in short films and theatre plays. Between 1995 and 2020 he has played in more than 50 roles in all theaters of the city of Belgrade. He is also a regular in the Military Academy (org. Vojna akademija) series (2012—).

=== International projects ===
In the years to come he shifted his focus to international cinema. He took a part in many foreign projects: The November Man, Chernobyl Diaries and In the Land of Blood and Honey (United States), The Sky Above Us (The Netherlands—Serbia), The Last Panthers and Despite the Falling Snow (United Kingdom), as well as in Indian, German, Italian cinema and television. Timotijević also played Varlek in American TV series The Outpost in 2018. His movie No One's Child (org. Ničije dete) was one of six films shortlisted by Serbia to be their submission for the Academy Award for Best Foreign Language Film at the 88th Academy Awards. The movie was also screened at the Venice Film Festival where it won Audience Award, FIPRESCI Award and Fedora Award for Best Screenplay.

=== 2016—now: Career peak ===
==== Humidity ====
Only in the period of 2016 his career has rapidly started to go up. In Humidity (org. Vlažnost) (Serbian - Greek - Dutch productions, premiered at the 66th Berlin International Film Festival), Miloš played the main role which brought him award for the best actor at the Belgrade International Film Festival - FEST. The Serbian Section of the International Federation of Film Critics (FIPRESCI) also awarded Miloš the Best Actor Award. The film has been screened at festivals around the world: in Vilnius, Uruguay, North Macedonia, the Sarajevo Film Festival, the Berlin Film Festival, Amsterdam and the Cannes Film Festival.

==== Black Sun ====
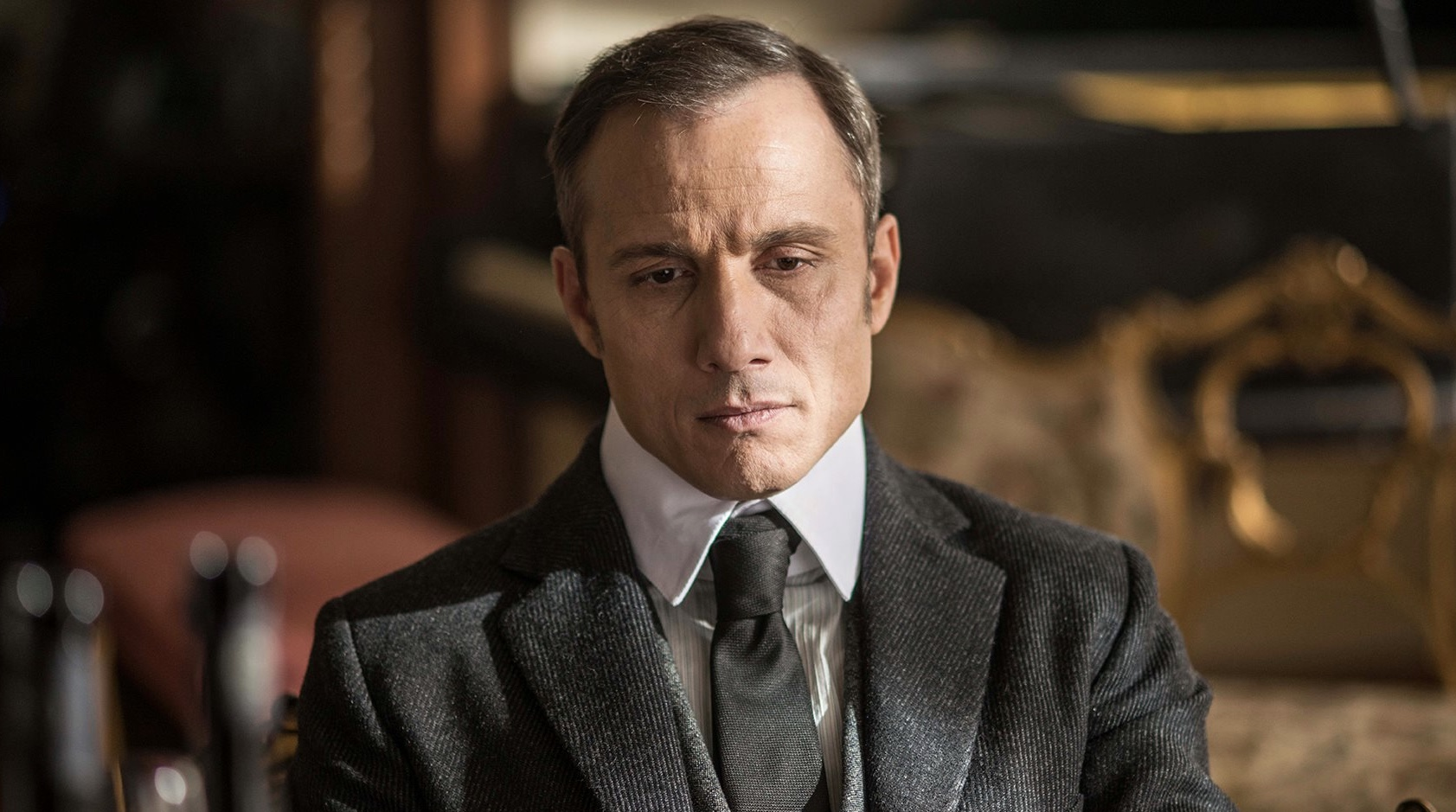
Miloš in ″Black Sun″

In 2017 Miloš got the role of Vojin Đukić in Black Sun (org. Senke nad Balkanom). The first season received universal critical acclaim and soon became one of the highest rated Serbian TV series of all time. Timotijević rose to even bigger fame thanks to an estimated 2 million viewers per episode. Black Sun won Golden Antenna (org. Zlatna antena) for the best Serbian series of 2017.

==== Besa ====
In 2019 Timotijević played one of the leading roles in Besa (org. Besa), television series of Serbian—British production. Miloš interpreted the character of Inspector Petrit Koczi - Interpol's chief man for the Western Balkans. He is a loner, dedicated to his job, a good detective, and the actor points out that he played his role with much pleasure, as Petrit is a ″good guy, with a dark side.″ For this role, Miloš had to learn his lines in Serbian, English and Albanian language. The series is based on a screenplay by British screenwriter Tony Jordan, in collaboration with Serbian writers. Besa won Golden Antenna (org. Zlatna antena) for the best Serbian television series of 2019.

==== South Wind ====
Career of Miloš Timotijević took a more significant turn in 2018, with the main role in Serbian blockbuster South Wind (org. Južni vetar). The film had almost 150.000 admissions in the first week of screening, breaking the record of the best opening for a domestic film, set by Zamphir’s Zona (org. Zona Zamfirova) in 2002. Miloš played one of the main roles, the corrupt police inspector Stupar, who operated as a link between the police, the state and the Balkan drug cartels. The South Wind series followed in 2020, recording a viewership of 2.1 million per episode.

== Personal life ==
He has not been a part of any scandal and tends to minimally participate in tabloid news. He always emphasizes that he doesn’t want to talk about his private life.

== Filmography ==
| Year | Title | Role | Notes |
|---|---|---|---|
| 1994 | Kraj dinastije Obrenović (TV series) | | |
| 1994 | Simpatija i antipatija (TV movie) | Mihailo Obrenović | |
| 1994 | Želja zvana tramvaj (TV movie) | | |
| 1996 | Srećni ljudi (TV series) | Pablo | |
| 1996—1997 | Gore dole (TV series) | Dejan | |
| 1997 | Raste trava (TV series) | Student | |
| 1998 | The Hornet | Emin | |
| 1998 | Kanal Mimo (TV series) | | |
| 1998 | Thief′s Comeback | | |
| 1998 | Dosije 128 (TV movie) | | |
| 2000 | Pronalazači (TV movie) | Police Inspector | |
| 2001 | The Crusaders (TV movie) | Johann | |
| 2002 | Labyrinth | Tamara’s Friend | |
| 2001—2002 | Porodično blago (TV series) | Inspector Lazarević | |
| 2003 | Lisice (TV series) | Petar | |
| 2003 | Priče o velikim matematičarima (TV series) | Nebojša | |
| 2006 | Seven and a Half | Tadija | |
| 2007 | The Fourth Man | Bodyguard | |
| 2007 | Vratiće se rode (TV series) | Ker (Hound) | |
| 2008 | Početak leta (short) | Branko | |
| 2008 | Bela lađa (TV series) | Alamunja’s Friend | |
| 2008 | Maša | Saki | |
| 2008 | Bitter Fruit (TV series) | Šeki | |
| 2008 | Drvo, kamen, oblak (short) | | |
| 2009 | Human Zoo | Boris | |
| 2010 | Greh njene majke (TV series) | | |
| 2010 | Kuku, Vasa (TV series) | | |
| 2010 | Sva ta ravnica (TV series) | Josip | |
| 2011 | Selo gori, a baba se češlja (TV series) | Doctor Zvonko | |
| 2011 | October | Miloš | |
| 2011 | Čuvar (short) | Bata | |
| 2011 | Žene sa Dedinja (TV series) | Hranislav Bekvalac | |
| 2011 | Practical Guide to Belgrade with Singing and Crying | | |
| 2011 | In the Land of Blood and Honey | Đura | |
| 2011 | Igra istine (TV series) | Moron | |
| 2011—2012 | Nepobedivo srce (TV series) | Lieutenant | |
| 2012 | Sergeant (short) | | |
| 2012—2020 | Military Academy (TV series) | Lieutenant Vasiljević | |
| 2012 | Chernobyl Diaries | Russian Check Point Guard | |
| 2012 | My Beautiful Country | Igor | |
| 2013 | Prostor između nas (short) | Ivan | |
| 2013 | Military Academy 2 | Lieutenant Vasiljević | |
| 2012 | Ravna Gora (TV series) | Corporal Čuturić | |
| 2014 | Gli anni spezzati (TV series) | | |
| 2014 | Odeljenje (TV series) | Inspector Cvijanović | |
| 2014 | The November Man | Federov’s Chief of Staff | |
| 2014 | No One's Child | Ilke | |
| 2015 | The Sky Above Us | Marko | |
| 2015 | For King and Homeland | Corporal Čuturić | |
| 2015 | The Last Panthers (TV series) | Bodyguard | |
| 2015—2016 | Čizmaši (TV series) | Lieutenant Zdrako Zec | |
| 2016 | Despite the Falling Snow | First Man | |
| 2016 | Humidity | Petar | |
| 2016 | ZG80 | Rile | |
| 2016 | Military Academy 3 | Captain Vaske | |
| 2017 | Život traje tri dana (short) | | |
| 2017 | Vivegam | Bad Guy 1 | |
| 2017 | Istine i laži (TV series) | Tasa | |
| 2016—2017 | Sumnjiva lica (TV series) | Lukovac | |
| 2017 | Black Sun (TV series) | Vojin Đukić | |
| 2018 | Comic Sans | Lukas | |
| 2018 | South Wind | Stupar | |
| 2019 | Dogs Die Alone | Branko | |
| 2019—2020 | Besa (TV series) | Petrit Koci | |
| 2019 | The Outpost (TV series) | Varlek | |
| 2019 | The Team | Deki BMW | |
| 2019 | Military Academy 5 | Captain Vaske | |
| 2020 | South Wind (TV series) | Stupar | |
| 2020 | Heavens Above | | |
| 2021 | Alexander of Yugoslavia (TV series) | George, Crown Prince of Serbia | |
| 2023 | Like Sheep Among Wolves | Milorad | |
| 2025 | Pearlescent Fog | Djordje Coguric | |
| 2025 | Robin Hood | Egbert | |
