= A Good Wife =

2016 film

- Film poster
- Directed by: Mirjana Karanović
- Written by: Mirjana Karanović
- Starring: Mirjana Karanović
- Release dates: 25 January 2016 (Sundance); 21 April 2016 (Serbia)
- Running time: 90 minutes
- Country: Serbia
- Language: Serbian

A Good Wife (Serbian: Dobra žena) is a 2016 Serbian drama film written, directed by and starring Mirjana Karanović. It was shown in the World Cinema Dramatic Competition section at the 2016 Sundance Film Festival. It was named as one of five films that could be chosen as the Serbian submission for the Best Foreign Language Film at the 89th Academy Awards, but it was not selected.

== Cast ==
- Mirjana Karanović as Milena
- Boris Isaković as Vlada
- Jasna Đuričić as Suzana
- Bojan Navojec as Dejan
- Hristina Popović as Nataša
- Vlado Kerošević as Sveta
- Ksenija Marinković as Zlata
- Isidora Simijonović as Katarina
- Marko Nikolić as Mirosljub
