= List of theatre acting awards =

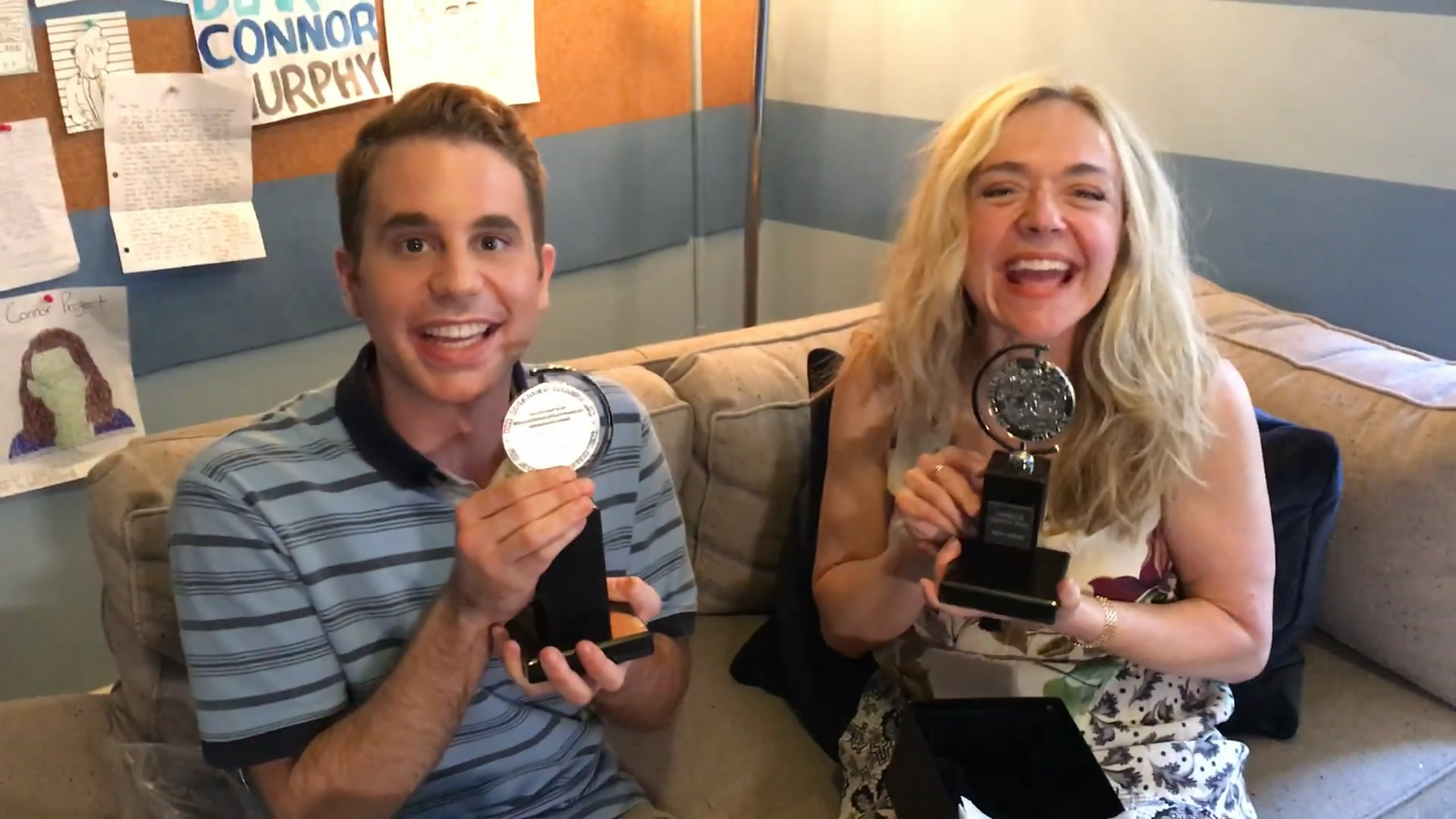
Tony Musical Award winners Ben Platt and Rachel Bay Jones open their Tony Awards in 2017

This list of theatre acting awards is an index to articles about awards for acting in live theatre. Some awards are given for acting in different types of theatre performance, including drama, comedy, musicals, opera etc. Others are limited to musicals or plays.

== General ==
Country	Award	Venue / sponsor	Description
Serbia	Dr. Branivoj Đorđević Award	Yugoslav Drama Theatre	Excellence in theatre performance and diction
United States	Drama Desk Award for Outstanding Solo Performance	Drama Desk Award	Outstanding solo performance
United States	Helen Hayes Awards Non-Resident Acting	Helen Hayes Award	Outstanding acting in non-resident or touring productions that are staged in the Washington, DC metropolitan area
Hong Kong	Hong Kong Drama Awards	Hong Kong Federation of Drama Societies	Outstanding performance in Hong Kong theatre
United Kingdom	Ian Charleson Awards	The Sunday Times, Royal National Theatre	Best classical stage performances in Britain by actors under age 30
Serbia	Ljubinka Bobić Award	Union of Serbian Dramatists	Critically and commercially successful actors, excelling in comedy
Netherlands	Louis d'Or (award)	Vereniging van Schouwburg- en Concertgebouwdirecties	Actor with the most impressive leading role of the theater season
Serbia	Miloš Žutić Award	Serbian Union of Dramatists	Actors with notable theatre roles
China	Plum Blossom Award	China Theatre Association	Performances in drama, opera etc.
Australia	Queensland Actors Equity Awards	Actors Equity / Media, Entertainment and Arts Alliance	Excellence in all forms of theatre in Queensland
Iceland	Silver Lamp Award	Association of Icelandic Drama Critics	Best performance of the year on the Icelandic stage
Croatia	Teatar.hr Award	Teatar.hr	Excellence in theatre activity
Netherlands	Theo d'Or	Vereniging van Schouwburg- en Concertgebouwdirecties	Actress with the most impressive leading role of the theater season
Serbia	Žanka Stokić award		Distinguished award for acting by an actress
Serbia	Zoran Radmilović Award	Sterijino pozorje	Actors predominating in dramatic arts
Serbia	Zoranov brk award	Dani Zorana Radmilovića	Best actor

== Musicals ==
Country	Award	Venue / sponsor	Notes
Canada	Dora Mavor Moore Award for Outstanding Performance by a Female in a Principal Role – Musical	Toronto Alliance for the Performing Arts	
Canada	Dora Mavor Moore Award for Outstanding Performance by a Male in a Principal Role – Musical	Toronto Alliance for the Performing Arts	
United States	Drama Desk Award for Outstanding Actor in a Musical	Drama Desk Award	
United States	Drama Desk Award for Outstanding Featured Actor in a Musical	Drama Desk Award	
United States	Drama Desk Award for Outstanding Actress in a Musical	Drama Desk Award	
United States	Drama Desk Award for Outstanding Featured Actress in a Musical	Drama Desk Award	
United Kingdom	Laurence Olivier Award for Best Actor in a Musical	Society of London Theatre	
United Kingdom	Laurence Olivier Award for Best Actress in a Musical	Society of London Theatre	
United Kingdom	Laurence Olivier Award for Best Actor in a Supporting Role in a Musical	Society of London Theatre	
United Kingdom	Laurence Olivier Award for Best Actress in a Supporting Role in a Musical	Society of London Theatre	
United Kingdom	Laurence Olivier Award for Best Performance in a Musical	Society of London Theatre	
United Kingdom	Laurence Olivier Award for Best Performance in a Supporting Role in a Musical	Society of London Theatre	
United States	Non-Equity Joseph Jefferson Award for an Outstanding Actor in a Cameo Role in a Musical	Jeff Award	Non-equity theatrical musical in Chicago
United States	Tony Award for Best Actor in a Musical	American Theatre Wing	
United States	Tony Award for Best Actress in a Musical	American Theatre Wing	
United States	Tony Award for Best Featured Actor in a Musical	American Theatre Wing	
United States	Tony Award for Best Featured Actress in a Musical	American Theatre Wing	

== Plays ==
Country	Award	Venue / sponsor	Notes
Canada	Dora Mavor Moore Award for Outstanding Performance by a Female in a Principal Role – Play (Large Theatre)	Toronto Alliance for the Performing Arts	
Canada	Dora Mavor Moore Award for Outstanding Performance by a Male in a Principal Role – Play (Large Theatre)	Toronto Alliance for the Performing Arts	
United States	Drama Desk Award for Outstanding Actor in a Play	Drama Desk Award	
United States	Drama Desk Award for Outstanding Featured Actor in a Play	Drama Desk Award	
United States	Drama Desk Award for Outstanding Actress in a Play	Drama Desk Award	
United States	Drama Desk Award for Outstanding Featured Actress in a Play	Drama Desk Award	
United Kingdom	Laurence Olivier Award for Actor of the Year in a New Play	Society of London Theatre	
United Kingdom	Laurence Olivier Award for Actor of the Year in a Revival	Society of London Theatre	
United Kingdom	Laurence Olivier Award for Actress of the Year in a New Play	Society of London Theatre	
United Kingdom	Laurence Olivier Award for Actress of the Year in a Revival	Society of London Theatre	
United Kingdom	Laurence Olivier Award for Best Actor	Society of London Theatre	
United Kingdom	Laurence Olivier Award for Best Actor in a Supporting Role	Society of London Theatre	
United Kingdom	Laurence Olivier Award for Best Actress	Society of London Theatre	
United Kingdom	Laurence Olivier Award for Best Actress in a Supporting Role	Society of London Theatre	
United States	Tony Award for Best Actor in a Play	American Theatre Wing	
United States	Tony Award for Best Actress in a Play	American Theatre Wing	
United States	Tony Award for Best Featured Actor in a Play	American Theatre Wing	
United States	Tony Award for Best Featured Actress in a Play	American Theatre Wing	

== See also ==
- Lists of awards
- Lists of acting awards
- List of theatre awards
