= Association of Dramatic Artists of Serbia =

- Abbreviation: UDUS
- Formation: September 15, 1919 (as Actors' Association)
- Type: Professional association
- Legal status: Representative association in culture (since 2011)
- Purpose: Development and improvement of dramatic arts, protection of professional rights and interests of members
- Location: Belgrade, Serbia
- Members: Dramatic artists (actors, directors, playwrights, dramaturgs) and artistic collaborators
- President: Pavle Pekić (current, since 2025)
- Website: www.udus.org.rs

The Association of Dramatic Artists of Serbia (Serbian: Удружење драмских уметника Србије, abbreviated as UDUS) is a professional association that gathers dramatic artists (actors, directors, playwrights, dramaturgs) and artistic collaborators (organizers, stage managers, prompters) in Serbia. It was founded in 1919 and is one of the oldest and most respected artistic organizations in the country.

== History ==
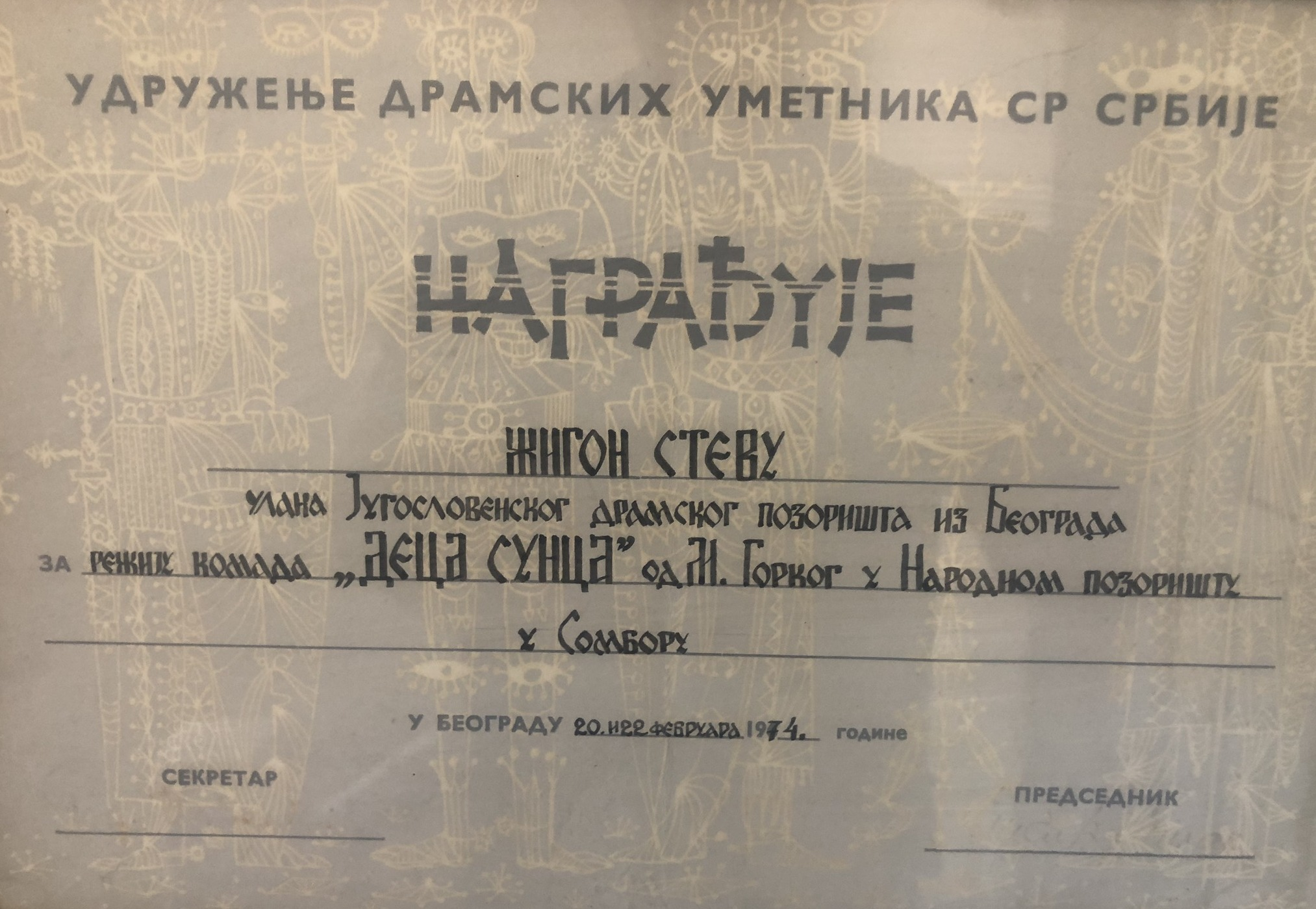
Award of the Association of Dramatic Artists of SR Serbia given to Stevo Žigon, part of the Žigon family legacy in Adligat

The idea of establishing an actors' association originated during World War I, when a group of Serbian actors, after retreating through Albania, created a theatre in Corfu. The first founding Assembly of the Actors' Association of the Kingdom of Serbs, Croats, and Slovenes (later Yugoslavia) was held on 15 September 1919, in Belgrade. King Alexander I Karađorđević agreed to be the high patron of the Association. At that time, the Association brought together not only actors but also other stage artists, including opera singers and ballet dancers. Actor Sava Todorović was elected as its first president.

The pre-war Actors' Association developed numerous significant activities: it maintained connections with the International Union of Actors, mediated in engaging members for film shootings, organized guest performances by foreign artists, collected funds from benefactors, provided loans and assistance to members in exercising their labor and social rights (salary increases, pensions), supported sick members and families of deceased members. The Association had an artistic labor exchange, an artistic agency, and was a patron of celebrations and actors' anniversaries. It also published a professional journal. The Association was recognized, respected, and supported by its members, prominent individuals, and the state, and was awarded the Order of St. Sava, III class.

At the end of 1947, the Actors' Association of the Kingdom of Yugoslavia was liquidated, and its property was inventoried and handed over to the Committee for Culture and Art of the Government of the FPRY. Theatrical items and furniture were then given to the newly established Yugoslav Drama Theatre.

The professional association was re-established on 23 April 1950, under the name Association of Dramatic Artists of PR Serbia (later UDUS). It became the legal successor of the pre-war association, and part of its property was returned, but real estate later went to the Federal Executive Council (SIV), leading to decades-long unsuccessful attempts to reclaim the property.

The post-war Association of Dramatic Artists of Serbia continued many activities based on the tradition and values of the pre-war Association. According to the Rules established at the Founding Assembly (1950), only actors and directors could initially be members. In the following years, playwrights, dramaturgs, as well as artistic collaborators – organizers, stage managers, and prompters – were also admitted to the Association. In the early 1985, the Association was renamed the Federation of Dramatic Artists of Serbia and gained the status of a social organization.

In July 2010, in accordance with the Law on Associations, it was re-registered as the Association of Dramatic Artists of Serbia (UDUS). Since 2011, UDUS has held the status of a representative association in culture.

=== Presidents of the Association ===
The first president of the Association was Sava Todorović (1919–1924). Other presidents of the pre-war association were Dragutin P. Gošić (1925–1928), Boža Nikolić (1929–1933, 1936–1940), and Jovan Gec (1940–1941). In the post-war period, the presidents were:

- Raša Plaović (1950–1952)
- Joža Rutić (1952–1956)
- Strahinja Petrović (1956–1959)
- Mira Stupica (1959–1961)
- Joža Rutić (1961–1963)
- Branko Pleša (1963–1968)
- Slavko Simić (1968–1973)
- Milan Puzić (1973–1976)
- Miodrag Radovanović (1976–1980)
- Miroslav Bijelić (1980–1982)
- Mira Banjac (1982–1984)
- Predrag "Miki" Manojlović (1984–1986)
- Predrag Ejdus (1986–1990)
- Dragan Nikolić (1990–1992)
- Svetlana Bojković (1992–1996)
- Svetislav Goncić (1996–1998)
- Tihomir Stanić (1998–2000)
- Danica Maksimović (2000–2002)
- Branislav Milićević (2002–2004)
- Sonja Jauković (2004–2006)
- Milan Gutović (2006–2008)
- Ljiljana Đurić (2008–2013)
- Vojislav Brajović (2013–2021)
- Nebojša Dugalić (2021–2025)
- Pavle Pekić (from 2025)

== Current Goals and Activities ==
The main goals of the Association of Dramatic Artists of Serbia are the development and improvement of dramatic arts, affirmation of its members, protection of their authorship and other professional rights, as well as cooperation with theatres, other artistic organizations, institutions, and associations in the country and abroad. The Association develops a range of activities, including:

- Bestowing prestigious artistic awards.
- Publishing the theatre newspaper "Ludus".
- Publishing activities (books, monographs).
- Organizing forums, meetings, and other programs.
- Providing legal assistance to members.
- Determining the status of freelance artist/artistic collaborator (since 1 July 1983).

== Ludus ==
Ludus is a theatre newspaper published by the Association of Dramatic Artists of Serbia. It was launched with the aim of affirming theatre art, improving information and communication in culture, and strives to present the most current events and reviews from the Serbian theatre scene, as well as news from abroad.

The first period of the newspaper's publication was in 1983, edited by Dejan Đurović. After eight issues published in bulletin form, the newspaper ceased publication due to lack of funds. It was re-launched on 5 November 1992. During one period (2007–2008), the newspaper was again not published due to financial difficulties. Since its (re)establishment, its editors have included Feliks Pašić, Aleksandar Milosavljević, Mirjana Ojdanić, Tatjana Nježić, and Maša Stokić. Since October 2014, "Ludus" has also been available in electronic form on the Association's website.

== UDUS Awards ==
The Association of Dramatic Artists of Serbia bestows several significant awards for artistic achievements in dramatic arts:

- Dobričin prsten (Dobrica's Ring): Lifetime achievement award, the highest acting recognition in Serbia.
- Miloš Žutić Award: Awarded for the best acting performance in professional theatres in the past season.
- Bojan Stupica Award: Awarded for the best direction in Serbian theatres in the previous two seasons.
- Ljubinka Bobić Award: Awarded for the best acting achievement in comedy.
