= Dr. Branivoj Đorđević Award =

Branivoj Đorđević Award
- Country: Serbia
- Presented by: Yugoslav Drama Theatre
- First award: 2004
- Website: http://jdp.rs/

The Dr. Branivoj Đorđević Award is an award given by the Yugoslav Drama Theatre to honour excellence in theatre performance and diction. The award is named after the prominent academy professor Dr. Branivoj Đorđević, famous for his TV drama Sokratova odbrana I smrt.

== Recipients ==
Year	Winner
2004	Branislav Lečić
2005	Nebojša Ljubišić
2006	Goran Daničić
2007	Vojin Ćetković
2008	Goran Jevtić
2009	Sloboda Mićalović
2010	Radovan Vujović
2011	Dragan Mićanović
2012	Nikola Vujović
2013	Vojin Ćetković
2014	Nataša Tapušković
2015	Vojislav Brajović
2016	Vojin Ćetković
2017	Nebojša Ljubišić
2018	Svetozar Cvetković
2019	Marko Janketić
