= Bobić =

Bobić, Bobic or Bobič is a surname. Notable people with the surname include:

- Bernardo Bobić (? –c. 1695), Croatian painter and gilder
- Ljubinka Bobić (1897–1978), Serbian actress
- Fredi Bobic (1971), German football executive and former player of Slovenian descent
- Predrag Bobić (born 1960), Croatian musician, guitarist and music pedagogue
