= Novogodišnje venčanje =

2002 Serbian television film

- Written by: Miodrag Karadžić
- Directed by: Zdravko Šotra
- Starring: Anita Mančić; Goran Jevtić; Petar Kralj; Dara Džokić; Tanja Bošković; Boris Komnenić; Svetislav Goncić; Dušanka Stojanović; Dragomir Čumić; Goran Daničić; Goran Jevtić; Katarina Janković
- Country of origin: FR Yugoslavia
- Original language: Serbian

Production
- Producers: Maksa Ćatović; Zoran Janković
- Editor: Petar Putniković
- Running time: 55 minutes

Original release
- Network: RTS
- Release: 31 December 2002

Novogodišnje venčanje (English: New Year's Wedding) is a Serbian comedy television film which was premiered on 31 December 2002. It was directed by Zdravko Šotra, and a screenplay written by Miodrag Karadžić.

== Cast ==
Actor	Role
Anita Mančić	Nadežda "Nada" Petrović
Goran Jevtić	Nemanja
Petar Kralj	Nikola
Dara Džokić	Milica (Nikola's wife)
Tanja Bošković	Tanja (Zoran's wife)
Boris Komnenić	Zoran (Nikola and Nada's brother)
Svetislav Goncić	Mile (Savka's brother)
Dušanka Stojanović	Savka
Dragomir Čumić	Stevo
Goran Daničić	Petar "Pera" Marinković
Goran Jeremić	Milan (Nikola's son)
Katarina Janković	Iva (Nikola's daughter)
