= Gordan Kičić =

Serbian actor, comedian and director (born 1977)

- Гордан Кичић
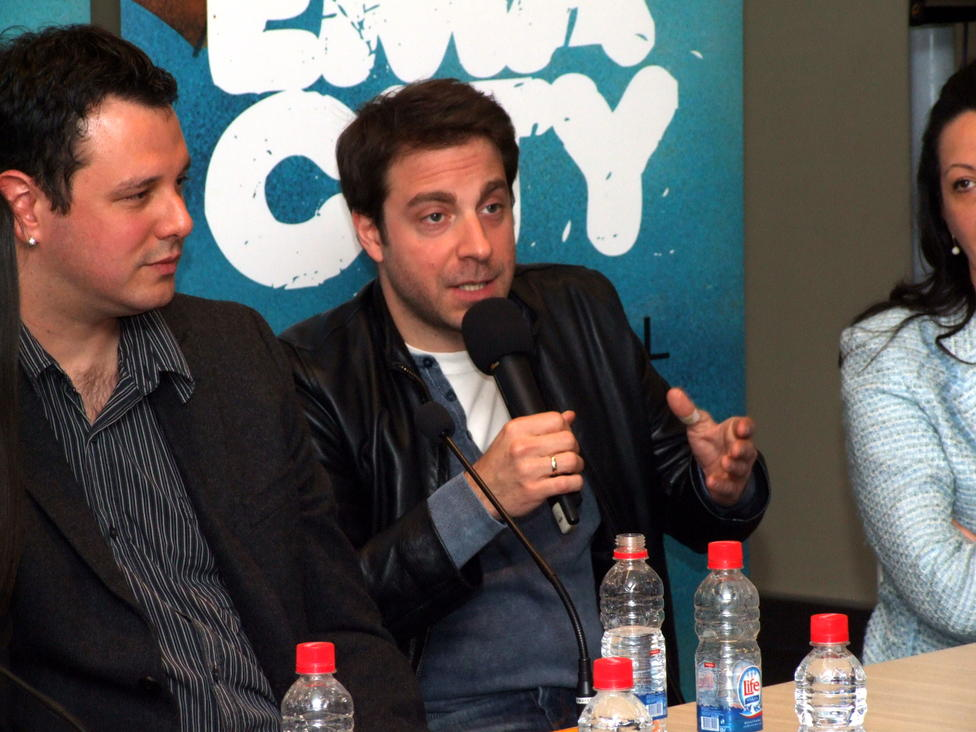
- Kičić in 2005
- Born: Gordan Kičić; 5 August 1977 (age 48); Belgrade, SR Serbia, SFR Yugoslavia
- Education: Faculty of Dramatic Arts
- Alma mater: University of Arts in Belgrade
- Occupations: Actor, director
- Years active: 1996–present

Gordan Kičić (Serbian Cyrillic: Гордан Кичић; born 5 August 1977) is a Serbian actor, comedian and director.

Acclaimed for both his comedic and dramatic roles, he is prominent for his starring role in the acclaimed television series Balkan Shadows, and for his roles in praised Serbian films War Live (2000), Sky Hook (2000), Mala noćna muzika (2002), Kad porastem biću Kengur (2004), Seven and a Half (2006) and Redemption Street (2012).

He is also known for his supporting role as foolish Rajko in the popular television comedy Otvorena vrata. In November 2019, he made his directorial debut with the successful film Realna priča.

He is a permanent member of the Atelje 212 theatre. In 2010, he won the Zoran Radmilović Award for his performance in the cult theatre's production of Hair.

== Career ==
=== Theatre ===
Kičić graduated from the Faculty of Dramatic Arts in Belgrade. Prior graduation, Kičić became member of the drama ensemble in Atelje 212, one of the leading theatres in Eastern Europe In 2016, the theater celebrated its 60-years anniversary. where he has appeared in over forty plays. His notable theatre credits in Atelje 212 include Don Juan, Revizor, Amadeus and Spamalot. In 2010, he starred in the theatre's production of Hair, starring alongside Sergej Trifunović, Branislav Trifunović, Ivan Jevtović, Jelena Gavrilović and Katarina Žutić. For his leading role as Berger, Kičić won the Zoran Radmilović Award for his performance in the cult theatre's production of Hair.

He has also prominently worked in productions of JDP including Smrt, Samo sivi dani, Coriolanus and Vazda, the latter being a duodrama with Radovan Vujović.

=== Film and television ===
He made his film debut in 1996 as Erceg in the film Do koske. His leading roles in War Live, Mala noćna muzika, Kad porastem biću Kengur, Seven and a Half and Redemption Street are credited with raising Kičić to prominence.

He starred in both film and television series of the innovative format cult classic Lavirint, as Laki. The role garnered him an Apollo Award at the Belgrade Culture Festival nomination.

Opposite Mirjana Karanović and Miloš Samolov, Kičić starred in 2009's Čekaj me, ja sigurno neću doći as the troubled and vulnerable Alek. His role won him the Emperor Constantine Award for Best Actor in a Supporting Role. That same year, in the film Posljednja audicijencija Kičić portrayed a young version of notable diplomat and politician Nikola Pašić.

He achieved a leading role in the Jagodići franchise, as Branko Jagodić. He appeared as the role in the television and three films.

In 2019, he starred in the box-office hit Četiri ruže as Žile, appeared in the Sergej Trifunović film Ajvar and made his directorial debut in Realna priča, in which he also starred in.

=== Radio and animation ===
Kičić also worked extensively for radio, recording radio dramas. Among his voice acting credits, Kičić is the official Serbian-language voice dub of Garfield, voicing the character in the television series Garfield and Friends and the films Garfield and Garfield 2. He voices Sheriff Woody in the Serbian Toy Story franchise. He also voiced Michelangelo in the Serbian version of the 2007 Teenage Mutant Ninja Turtles film.

== Personal life ==
Kičić was elected on 5-year term as a member of the Assembly of the Crvena zvezda Basketball Club on 27 December 2021.

== Filmography ==
=== Film ===
Year	Title	Role
1996-1999
1996	Do koske	Erceg
1997	Land of Truth, Love and Freedom	Gogo
1998	Bekstvo	Antoan Griščenko
1998	Natalija	Marko
1999	Sky Hook	Miša
1999	Proputovanje	Dejo
2000-2009
2000	Dorćol-Manhattan	Riki
2000	Rat uživo	Đole
2000	Mehanizam	Debeli
2001	Ona voli Zvezdu	Srba
2001	Metla bez drške	Lepota
2002	Lavirint	Laki
2002	Mala noćna muzika	Cole
2003	E-Snuff	Frula
2004	Poljupci	Gizdo
2004	Kad porastem biću kengur	Sumpor
2005	Libero	Dealer
2005	Potera za sreć(k)om	Žile
2006	Sedam i po	Srđan
2007	Mile protiv tranzicije	Gordan
2008	Turneja	Lale
2009	Poslednja audijencija	Young Nikola Pašić
2009	Čekaj me, ja sigurno neću doći	Alek
2009	Ono kao ljubav	Fredi
2010-2020
2010	Sva ta ravnica	Branko Jagodić
2010	Neke druge priče	Milan
2010	Ma nije on takav	Inspector Aleksandar Gavrić
2011	Zajedno	Gambler
2011	Beli lavovi	Gruja
2012	Ustanička ulica	Dušan
2014	Jagodići: Oproštajni valcer	Branko Jagodić
2015	Tri policajca	Luka
2016	Ubice mog oca	Lawyer Rončević
2018	Intrigo: Death of an Author	Novinar
2019	Ajvar	Sergej
2019	Četiri ruže	Žile
2019	Realna priča	Veljko Radisavljević
2019	Sedra	Obren
2020	Apsurdni eksperiment	Srki
2020	Nije loše biti čovek	Vanja

=== Television ===
Year	Title	Role
2002	Lavirint	Laki
2002	Lisice	Damir
2003	Siroti mali hrčki 2010	Student
2003	Kazneni prostor 2	TV host
2004-2007	Lift	Gagi
2011-2012	Kako su me ukrali Nemci	Blagoje
2012	Jagodići	Branko Jagodić
2013	Otvorena vrata	Rajko
2017—2018	Vojna akademija	Branković
2017—2019	Senke nad Balkanom	Alimpije Mirić / Kaluđer
2018	Patuljci sa naslovnih strana	Nikola

=== Voice-over roles ===
Dubbing Year	Title	Role
2004	Shark Tale	Lenny
2004	Garfield	Garfield
2005	Home on the Range	Jeb the Goat
2006	Garfield 2	Garfield
2007	Ratatouille	Lalo
2007	The Simpsons Movie	Krusty the Clown
2007	Shrek the Third	Cyclops
2007	Teenage Mutant Ninja Turtles	Michelangelo
2007	Bee Movie	Hector
2010	Toy Story	Sheriff Woody
2010	Toy Story 2	Sheriff Woody
2010	Toy Story 3	Sheriff Woody
2010	Beauty and the Beast	Chef Bouche
2011	Rango	Rango
2012	Ice Age: Continental Drift	Squint
2019	Toy Story 4	Sheriff Woody
