= Academy of Arts, University of Osijek =

Art school of the University of Osijek

Coordinates: 45.557°N 18.706°E

The Academy of Arts and Culture in Osijek
- Akademija za umjetnost i kulturu u Osijeku
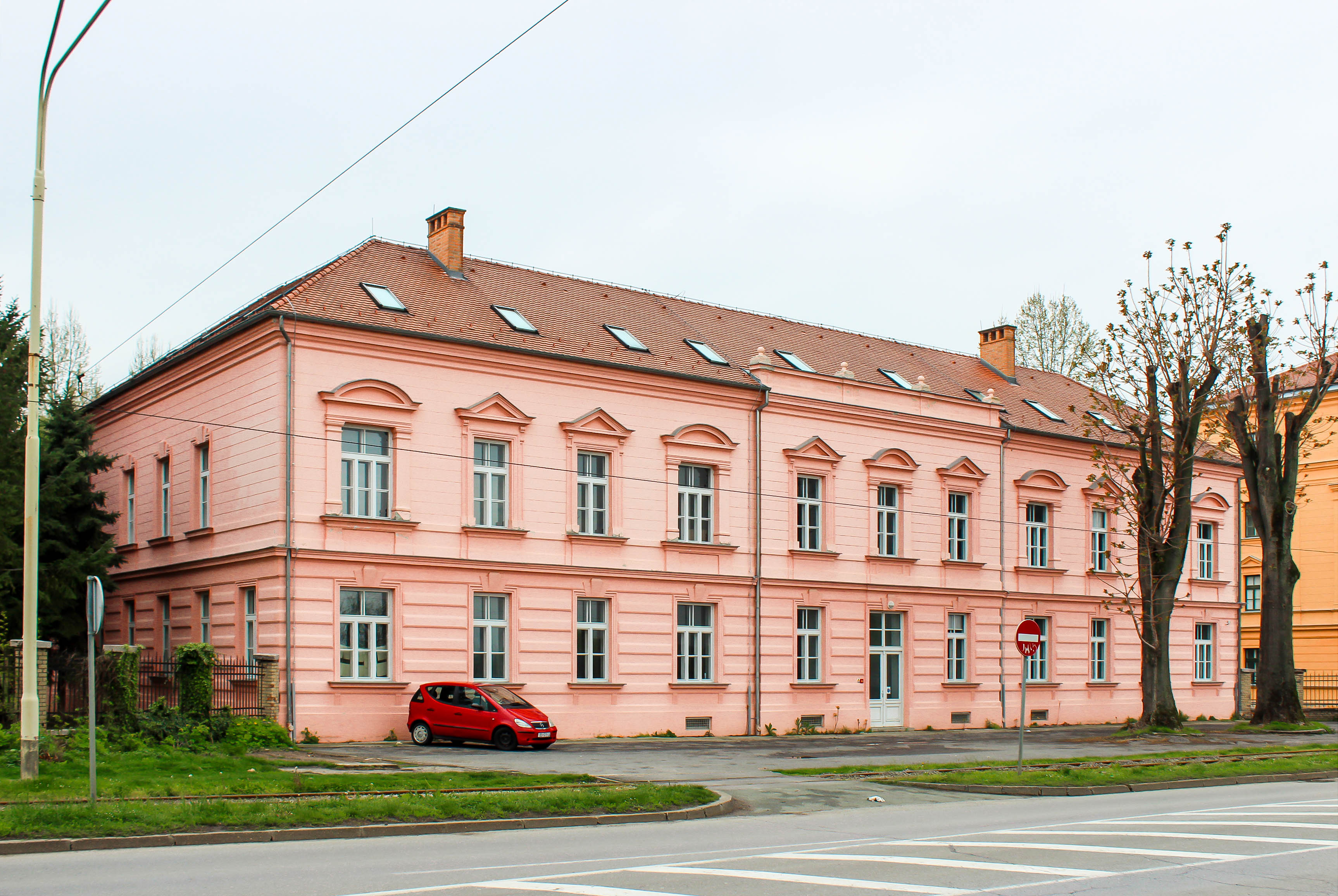
- Type: Public
- Established: 18 October 2004 (21 years ago)
- Location: Osijek, Croatia
- Website: uaos.unios.hr

The Academy of Arts and Culture in Osijek (Croatian: Akademija za umjetnost i kulturu u Osijeku) is a Croatian art school affiliated with the University of Osijek.

== History ==
The Academy was founded in October 2004 when the Department Section of Music ceased to be a part of the Faculty of Philosophy in Osijek in order to be joined by some new courses (Piano, Voice, Acting and Puppetry, Fine Arts) in the formation of an independent institution.

In October 2005, the Academy moved to its own premises once occupied by the barracks and now the location of the future university campus. Until then, the courses had been taught at different locations in Osijek, such as the Faculty of Philosophy, Branko Mihaljević Children's Theatre, the Croatian National Theatre, the Students' Centre and the Kazamat Gallery.

Today, the Academy has at its disposal some 3000 square meters, including four buildings with separate rooms for the theoretical and practical teaching of each course, its own library and the dean's office.

Since the academic year 2005–06, the study programmes have been implemented in accordance with the Bologna process.

On 28 January 2025, students of the Academy organized a protest and 5 minutes of silence against teacher and actor Domagoj Mrkonjić, who was accused of violent behavior towards students and being under the influence of alcohol and drugs during class. Mrkonjić was first ordered to quit his position at the Academy by the Disciplinary Committee, but issued a complaint, which was accepted by the Academy's Complaints Committee due to the teacher being "under stress". The Complaints Committee ultimately decided to issue a final warning to Mrkonjić and suspend him until October 2025, which students claimed isn't sufficient considering the accusations levvied against him. The students called for an indefinite suspension pending conclusions from police and State Attorney's Office investigations. The protest garnered support from students of the Academy of Dramatic Art in Zagreb, the Academy of Applied Arts in Rijeka and the Art Academy in Split.

== Organization ==
The Academy has 6 departments:

- Department of Music Arts
- Department of Instrumental Studies and Composition with Music Theory
- Department of Theatre Arts
- Department of Creative Technologies
- Department of Culture, Media and Management
- Department of Visual and Media Arts
