= Lidija Vukićević =

Serbian actress and politician

- Лидија Вукићевић
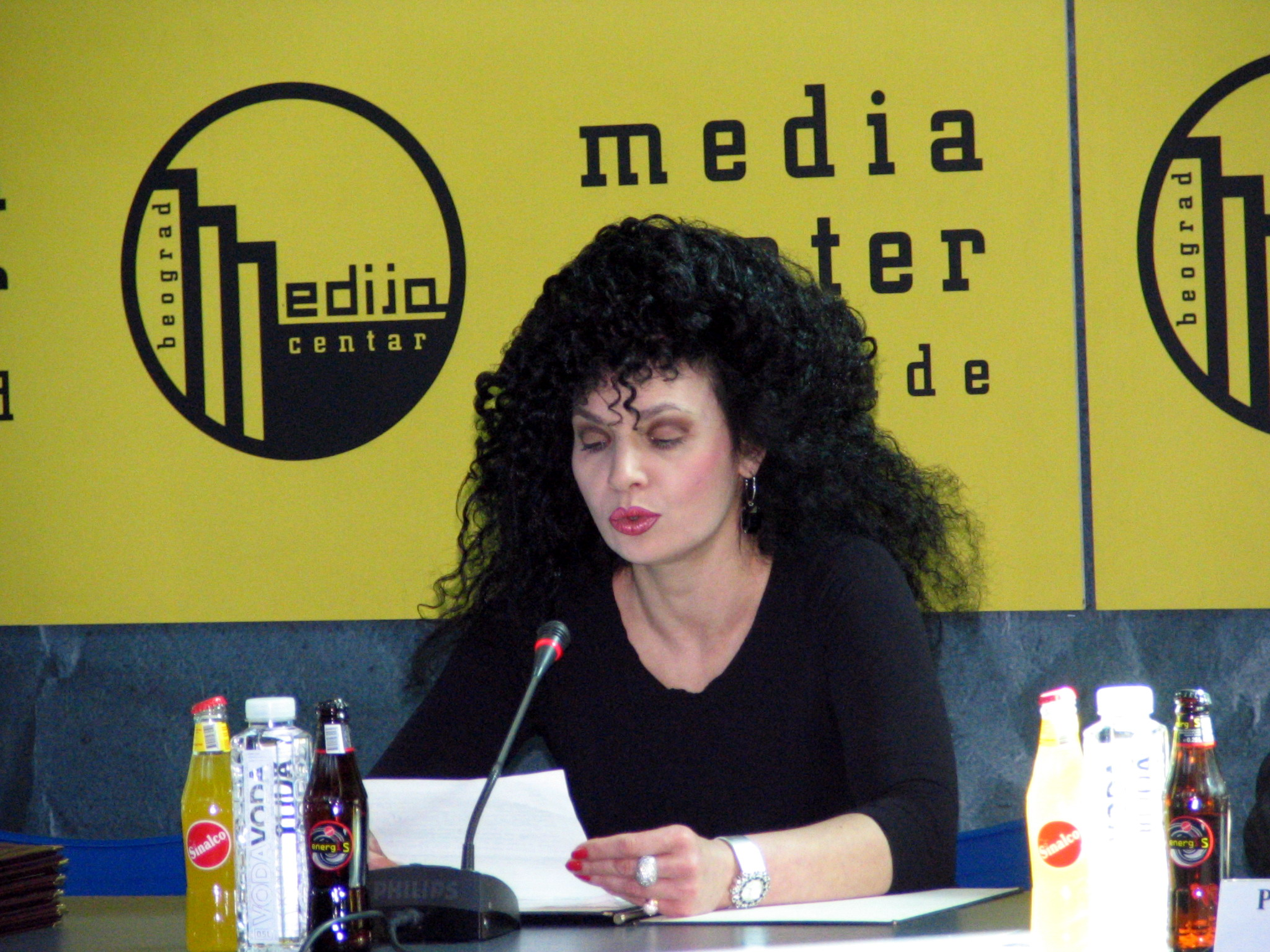
- Vukićević presenting the Zbilja magazine's lifetime literary achievement award in March 2006

Member of the National Assembly
- Incumbent
- Assumed office 17 November 2026
- In office June 2007 – May 2012

Personal details
- Born: 20 July 1962 (age 64) Kraljevo, PR Serbia, FPR Yugoslavia
- Party: SRS (2004–2012); SNS (2026–present)
- Spouse: Mitar Mrkela (m. 1991; div. 2000)
- Children: 2, including Andrej
- Occupation: Actress

Lidija Vukićević (Serbian: Лидија Вукићевић; born 20 July 1962) is a Serbian film and television actress and politician. She is best known for playing Violeta "Viki" Popadić, the daughter of the central family in the television series Bolji život, and her acting career peaked from the mid-1980s to the early 1990s.

A member of the Serbian Radical Party (SRS) from 2004 to 2012, she served as one of its MPs in the National Assembly from 2007 to 2012. She later became a supporter of Aleksandar Vučić and his Serbian Progressive Party (SNS); she was ninth on the SNS-led list in the 2026 parliamentary election and joined the party after the election.

== Acting career ==
Following several small roles on film and television, her cinematic career in Yugoslavia was launched in 1985 after being cast in Zoran Čalić's Žikina dinastija, the seventh instalment of the Lude godine popular folksy comedy film series. Twenty two years of age at the time, Vukićević played the role of sexy housemaid Lilika.

The exposure on Žikina dinastija, and especially regular appearances on Bolji život, led to more roles in Yugoslav movies such as the lead in Lutalica (also written and directed by Čalić), playing a small-town Romani budding folk singer arriving in the capital Belgrade to perform at a kafana in pursuit of a singing career. Then came prominent supporting roles in Špijun na štiklama and Vampiri su među nama (second instalment of Čalić's Ćao, inspektore film series).

In December 2024, Vukićević withdrew from membership in the Serbian Actors Guild (UDUS) in protest of the organization's statement of support for the 2024–2026 Serbian anti-corruption protests.

== Political career ==
=== Serbian Radical Party ===
In 2004, Vukićević joined the opposition Serbian Radical Party, whose leader Vojislav Šešelj had been detained in The Hague for over a year, awaiting trial at the International Criminal Tribunal for the former Yugoslavia. In his absence, the party, which had won 27.62% of the vote in the 2003 parliamentary election and held 82 seats in the National Assembly, more than any other party at the time, was led by Tomislav Nikolić, Aleksandar Vučić and Dragan Todorović. She later said that she had joined the party because she was angered by the way a television programme portrayed Serbs.

Vukićević was on the SRS list in the 2007 parliamentary election, in which the party won 29.07% of the vote, and became one of its 81 MPs; she rarely spoke in the Assembly. When the SRS split in September 2008, with many members, led by Nikolić and Vučić, leaving to form the Serbian Progressive Party, she remained in the SRS. In 2010, she told Politika that she owed her membership mainly to the party's programme and to Šešelj, whom she trusted. In 2012, she led the programme of the rallies of Jadranka Šešelj's presidential campaign and accused Nikolić and Vučić of having deceived the party's voters.

Her term ended after the 2012 parliamentary election, in which the SRS won 4.62% of the vote and failed to cross the 5% threshold. Along with a number of prominent members, she then left the party; Šešelj's personnel decisions after the defeat, such as naming Vjerica Radeta as vice-president, were reported to have precipitated the departures, and Vukićević blamed Radeta for the defeat.

=== Support for SNS ===
From 2013, Vukićević was a member of the council, and later of the assembly, of the state-owned publisher Prosvetni pregled. She was on the SNS list in the 2020 Belgrade City Assembly election and took part in SNS campaign events in 2023 and 2024, including the "Serbia Must Not Stop" rally. In the 2026 parliamentary election, she was ninth on the SNS-led "Aleksandar Vučić – United Serbia" list, the highest-placed actor on it. On 27 October 2026, two days after the list was defeated by the Student List, Miloš Vučević, the president of SNS, announced that Vukićević and marketing expert Nebojša Krstić had joined the party.

On 17 November 2026, the National Assembly convened for their first session since the election occurred. Whilst Vukićević walked up the steps to the building, the former secretary of the Faculty of Medicine, Marija Radovanovic, poured yogurt over Vukićević’s head. As a consequence of Radovanović's actions, Pistaljka cancelled her power of attorney, in a whistleblowing dispute that their lawyers represented Radovanovic in. Instead of panicking, Vukićević posed for the cameras gathered for the session, before cleaning up her hair with wetwipes. A video of the incident went viral on social media. Vukićević later stated at a press conference that she was "attacked by Serbs" and that, in addition to the yogurt, other people had pulled her hair.

== Personal life ==
During the early 1990s, Vukićević began dating the professional footballer Mitar Mrkela, three years her junior, playing with Red Star Belgrade at the time. They got married in 1991 and Vukićević moved to Enschede, Netherlands, joining Mrkela who had in the meantime transferred to an Enschede-based club, Twente. In 1992, they had a child, son Andrej, who would follow in his father's footsteps by becoming a professional footballer and later football administrator. Their second son, David, was born in 1997.

The couple divorced in 2000.

In the early 2000s, she was reportedly in a relationship with the Yugoslav Army's former Chief of the General Staff, colonel general Nebojša Pavković.
