= Mrkonjić =

Mrkonjić (Serbian Cyrillic: Мркоњић) is a Serbo-Croatian surname. It may refer to:

== People ==
- Domagoj Mrkonjić (born 1988), Croatian actor and lecturer
- Milutin Mrkonjić (born 1942), Serbian politician
- Petar Mrkonjić (mid-17th century), legendary brigand in Dalmatia
- Petar Mrkonjić, nom de guerre of Peter I of Serbia (1844–1921), King of Serbia
- Tomislav Mrkonjić (born 1994), Croatian footballer
- Zvonimir Mrkonjić (born 1938), Croatian writer, poet

== Toponyms ==
- Mrkonjić Grad, a town and municipality in western Bosnia and Herzegovina

== See also ==
- Mrkonjići, a town in southern Bosnia and Herzegovina
- Mrkonje, a village in southern Serbia
