= Miloš Žutić Award =

- Country: Serbia
- Presented by: Serbian Union of Dramatists
- First award: 1994

The Miloš Žutić Award (Serbian: Награда Милош Жутић, romanized: Nagrada Miloš Žutić) is an eminent Serbian award given by the Serbian Union of Dramatists, to actors with notable theatre roles. Presented since 1994, it is named after successful theatre actor Miloš Žutić.

The recipients of this accolade include critically and commercially acclaimed performers, including Goran Jevtić, Branislav Lečić, Bojan Žirović, Boris Milivojević, Vojin Ćetković and Nebojša Glogovac, who won the award two times, setting a record.

== Laureats ==
Year	Recipient	Role	Production	Theatre
1994	Petar Kralj	Norman	Garderobar	Yugoslav Drama Theatre
1995	Jasna Đuričić	Olga	Murlin Murlo	Serbian National Theatre
1996	Seka Sablić	Maria Callas	Master Class	Bitef Theatre
1997	Branislav Zeremski	Ivan	Art	Atelje 212
1998	Boris Isaković	The President	Leonce and Lena	Budva Theatre
1999	Jelena Đokić	Katarina Šparović	Bokeški de-mol	Tivat Centre for Culture
2000	Nebojša Glogovac	Simeon	Zlatno runo	Serbian National Theatre
2001	Đurđija Cvetić	Phaedria	Aulularia	Yugoslav Drama Theatre
2002	Olga Odanović	Milica Gerasimović	Govornica	Yugoslav Drama Theatre
2003	Dragan Mićanović	Antonio	The Merchant of Venice	Yugoslav Drama Theatre
2004	Nebojša Glogovac	Ivan	Hadersfield	Yugoslav Drama Theatre
2005	Goran Jevtić	Marin	Okamenjeni princ	Duško Radović Theatre
2006	Pavle Pekić	Svetozar Ružić	Pokondirana Tikva	Kikinid Theatre
2007	Vojin Ćetković	Don Krsto	Don Krsto	Yugoslav Drama Theatre
2008	Bojan Žirović	Kristijan	Proslava	Atelje 212
2009	Dušanka Stojanović	Home	At Home	Serbian National Theatre
2010	Svetozar Cvetković	King Richard III	King Richard III	Yugoslav Drama Theatre
2011	Nenad Stojmenović	Valere	The Miser	Serbian National Theatre
2012	Saša Torlaković	Minion	The Minions	Atelje 212
2013	Nebojša Dugalić	Robert	Izdaja	Atelje 212
2014	Boris Milivojević	Edgar	King Lear	Atelje 212
2015	Nikola Đuričko	Meni Moped	Ovo je danas	Atelje 212
2016	Branislav Lečić	Harpagon	The Miser	Serbian National Theatre
2017	Ivan Jevtović	Vuksha	Kovare	Serbian National Theatre
2018	Katarina Žutić	Frosine	The Miser	Atelje 212
2019	Nenad Jezdić	Jožef Kantor	Kralj Betajnove	Yugoslav Drama Theatre
