= Radovan Vujović =

Serbian actor

- Радован Вујовић
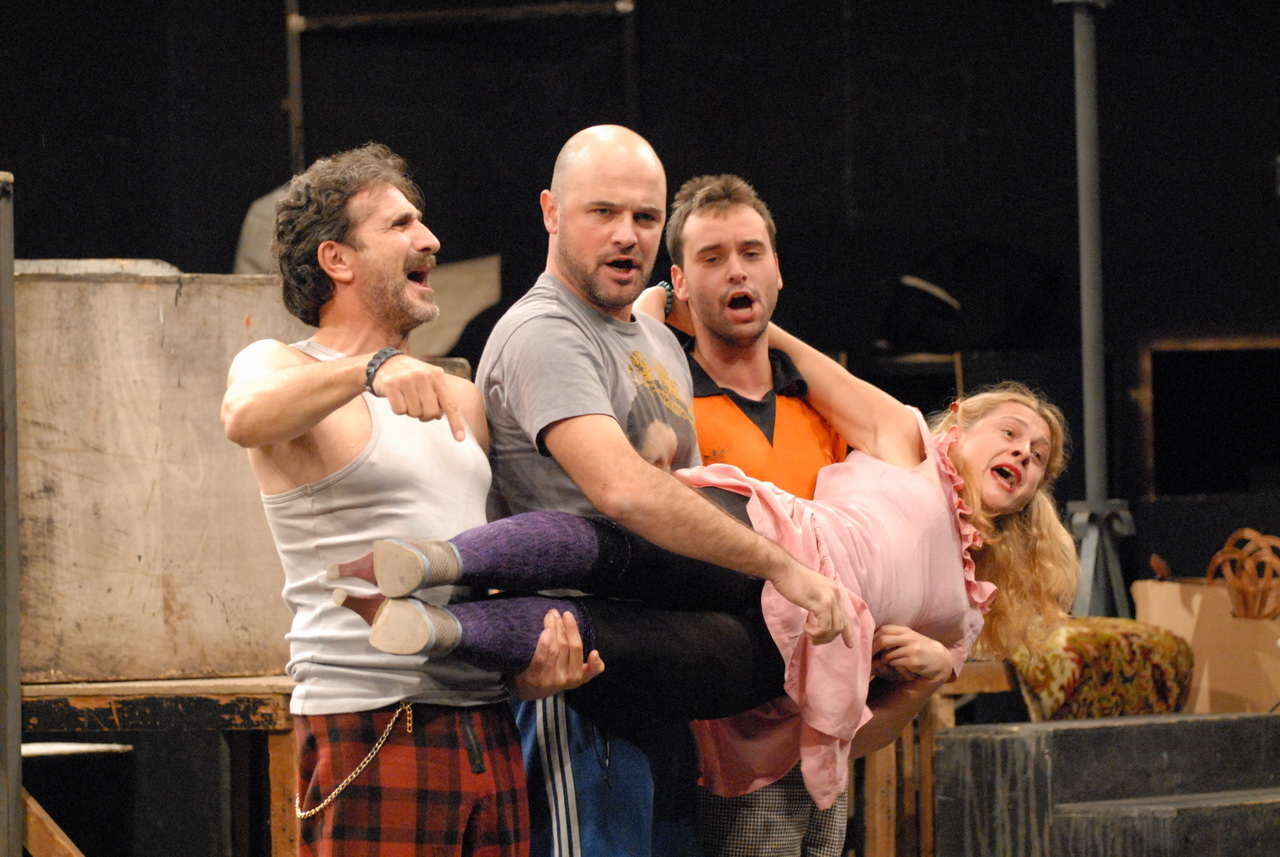
- Radoje Čupić, Nenad Pećinar, Radovan Vujović and Jasna Đuričić performing "Brod za lutke" at the Serbian National Theatre
- Born: 8 September 1984 (age 42); Titovo Užice, SFR Yugoslavia
- Education: Faculty of Dramatic Arts
- Alma mater: University of Arts in Belgrade
- Occupation: Actor
- Years active: 2000–present

Radovan Vujović (born 8 September 1984) is a Serbian actor, comedian and director.

After graduating Faculty of Dramatic Arts in Belgrade in 2005, he became a member of the Boško Buha Theatre. Since 2010, he works as a member of the Yugoslav Drama Theatre ensemble.

In 2006, he made his first lead role in Šejtanov ratnik. He has since starred in numerous films, including We Will Be the World Champions (2015), ZG80 (2016), Offenders (2017) and King Petar of Serbia (2018). He is perhaps best known for his critically lauded role as Radisav Risović Ris in the successful television series Vojna akademija (2012-2017), and films Vojna akademija (2012) and Vojna akademija 2 (2013).

== Biography ==
A native of the western Serbian city Užice, he graduated from the Faculty of Dramatic Arts, University of Arts in Belgrade in the class of Biljana Mašić. He was hired as a member in the Boško Buha Theatre upon graduation. He performed in the theatre from 2005 to 2010, and has accomplished lead roles in plays such as Othello, As You Like It, The Brothers Karamazov, Three Sisters, In Agony, Tartuffe, Metamorphosis and Les Précieuses ridicules, presenting himself well in comedic and dramatic roles. He has also performed as a guest in several European theatres.

He has won two Emperor Constantine (Car Konstantin) awards, one for Pogled u nebo and one for Offenders. He won the Dr. Branivoj Đorđević Award in 2010. He has won three prominent JDP Theatre Awards, in 2009, 2011 and 2016.

His first prominent television role came with the comedic, rural portrayal of aggressive loner Siledžija Mića in the popular Serbian television series Ljubav, navika, panika, with Zijah Sokolović and Gorica Popović in supporting roles.

He is widely known for his role as Radisav Risović Ris in the successful television series Vojna akademija (2012-2017), and the films Vojna akademija (2012) and Vojna akademija 2 (2013). He portrayed Prince Paul of Yugoslavia in the Dragan Bjelogrlić-directed cult televised series Shadows over Balkan.

Alongside fellow actor and close friend Jakov Jevtović, Vujović directed, conceived and starred in the commercially successful comedy mini-series Komunalci, as gaffe-prone and corrupt police officer Gaga.

He was nominated for an Apollo Award for his role as Srđan Kalember in the cult 2015 sports drama film We Will Be the World Champions, directed by Darko Bajić.

He has voiced numerous characters for Serbian-language versions of prominent animated feature films.

== Filmography ==
=== Film ===
Year	Title	Role	Notes
2000	Land of Truth, Love and Freedom	Jovan	Dara Čalenić Award for Best Actor
2002	Dobro poznata stvar	Veljko	Short film
2003	Pivac Vedletov	Gavrilo	
2004	Svinjar	Branković	
2005	Jedan dan u belom	Saša	Short film
2006	Šejtanov ratnik	Cane	
2007	Pogled u nebo	Edvard	2008 Emperor Constantine Award for Best Actor
2011	Coriolanus	Guard	
2012	Vojna akademija	Radoslav Risović Ris	2012 Emperor Constantine Award for Best Actor nomination Serbian Oscar of Popularity for Best Actor
2013	Vojna akademija 2	Radoslav Risović Ris	2013 Emperor Constantine Award for Best Actor nomination
2014	MioDrag	Advokat	
2015	We Will Be the World Champions	Srđan Kalember	
2017	Offenders	Aleksandar	2018 Emperor Constantine Award for Best Actor nomination
2018	King Peter of Serbia	Života	2019 Emperor Constantine Award for Best Actor

=== Television ===
Year	Title	Role	Notes
2003–2004	Losing	Branislav	6 episodes
2006–2008	Ljubav, navika, panika	Siledžija Mića	Supporting role
2012–2017	Vojna akademija	Radoslav Risović Ris	Lead role
2014–2020	Komunalci	Gaga	Lead role
2014–2017	Urgentni centar	Miki	Supporting role
2017–present	Pet	Vaca	Lead role
2018–present	Koreni	Vukasin	Lead role
2019	Drzavni sluzbenik	Macan	Guest role
2019–present	Shadows over Balkan	Prince Paul of Yugoslavia	Supporting role
2024	Air Bridge	Zvonko Vučković	Supporting role

=== Voice-over roles ===
Dubbing Year	Title	Role
2004	Brother Bear	Kenai
2004	Shrek	Donkey
2004	Finding Nemo	Bloat
2004	Monsters, Inc.	Yeti; Lanky Schmidt; Charlie Proctor; Jerry
2004	Shrek 2	Donkey
2004	Shark Tale	Oscar
2004	The Incredibles	The Underminer
2005	Home on the Range	Buck
2005	The Jungle Book	Kaa
2005	Tarzan	Flynt, Captain
2006	Cinderella	Gus
2007	Shrek the Third	Donkey
2007	Teenage Mutant Ninja Turtles	Leonardo
2007	The Simpsons Movie	Apu Nahasapeemapetilon; Hans Moleman
2008	The Jungle Book 2	Kaa
2009	The Princess and the Frog	Naveen
2010	Beauty and the Beast	Beast
2010	How to Train Your Dragon	Gobber
2010	Dinosaur	Aladar
2010	Shrek Forever After	Donkey
2010	Tangled	Short Thug
2011	Rango	Turley
2011	Kung Fu Panda 2	Master Croc
2013	Turbo	Chet
2014	How to Train Your Dragon 2	Gobber
2016	Finding Dory	Bloat
2016	Kung Fu Panda 3	Master Croc
2018	Incredibles 2	The Underminer
2019	How to Train Your Dragon 3	Gobber
