= Mitar Mrkela =

Serbian footballer

Personal information
- Full name: Mitar Mrkela
- Date of birth: 10 July 1965 (age 61)
- Place of birth: Belgrade, SFR Yugoslavia
- Height: 1.76 m (5 ft 9 in)
- Position: Winger

Senior career*
Years	Team	Apps	(Gls)
1981–1983	OFK Beograd	45	(4)
1983–1990	Red Star Belgrade	154	(30)
1990–1992	Twente	61	(10)
1992–1993	Beşiktaş	23	(4)
1993–1994	Cambuur	18	(2)
Total		301	(50)

International career
1982–1986	Yugoslavia	5	(1)
Medal record
Men's Football
Representing Yugoslavia
Olympic Games
Bronze medal – third place	1984 Los Angeles	Team
- * Club domestic league appearances and goals

Mitar Mrkela (Serbian Cyrillic: Митар Мркела; born 10 July 1965) is a Serbian retired footballer, who was a member of the Yugoslavian team that won the bronze medal at the 1984 Summer Olympics in Los Angeles, California.

== Playing career ==
He started his senior pro career with OFK Beograd in 1981 at only 16 years and 16 days of age (at that time the youngest ever in the Yugoslav First League), before moving on to Red Star Belgrade in 1983 where he stayed until 1990. After appearing in one league game for Red Star in 1990/91 season, he transferred to Dutch club FC Twente and stayed there for two seasons. He played several matches for Beşiktaş in the 1992-1993 season and scored 4 goals, before returning to the Netherlands with SC Cambuur.

Mrkela holds distinction as the youngest player ever to play for SFR Yugoslavia national squad. He was only 17 years and 130 days old when he made his national team debut on 17 November 1982 during a Euro 1984 qualifier versus Bulgaria in Sofia. Head coach Todor Veselinović brought him on in the 17th minute in place of injured Zvonko Živković. However, despite a lot of early promise, Mrkela would go on to make only 5 national team appearances, scoring 1 goal.

== Post-playing career ==
For a time in early 2000s, Mrkela was the president of City of Belgrade Football Association. He then became the youth coach in the OFK Beograd system.

In July 2005, soon after Dragan Stojković took over as club president from Dragan Džajić, Mrkela became the director of Red Star Belgrade youth academy - a job up to that moment performed by Goran Đorović.

After leaving his post at Red Star in December 2008, he became the sporting director at OFK Beograd.

== Personal life ==
In 1991, Mrkela married actress Lidija Vukićević. They have two sons: Andrej, born in 1992 and who also was a professional footballer, and David, born in 1997. The couple divorced in 2000.

With his second wife Olgica, 21 years his junior, Mrkela has a son, Dušan (born in 2013).

For a while, Mrkela was politically active in the Serbian Renewal Movement (SPO).
