= The Collector (Serbian TV series) =

Television series

- Created by: Marko Kamenica
- Starring: Petar Kralj
- Country of origin: Serbia
- No. of episodes: 12

Production
- Running time: 10-15 minutes (approx.)

Original release
- Network: Studio B
- Release: 2005 – 2006

The Collector (Sakupljač - original title) is the first Serbian science fiction television series. The first five episodes were produced and broadcast by Studio B in December 2005, and the further seven episodes were broadcast during 2006. The Collector is based on a story by Zoran Živković who won the World Fantasy Award. All 12 episodes are directed by Marko Kamenica.

The episodes can be watched separately, but together they form a coherent story arc, which is linked together by the titular Collector, played by Petar Kralj. Aside from the Collector, there is another character, a different one every episode, who changes his passion for collecting: memory, hope, autographs of dying people, etc. The series is made using minimal special effects, but in the style of The Twilight Zone.

== Cast ==
- Petar Kralj
- Dubravko Jovanović
- Dragomir Čumić
- Vladan Dujović
- Branislav Ciga Jerinić
- Milan Mihailovic
- Srdjan Ivanovic
