= Andrej Mrkela =

Serbian footballer

Personal information
- Full name: Andrej Mrkela
- Date of birth: 9 April 1992 (age 34)
- Place of birth: Enschede, Netherlands
- Height: 1.84 m (6 ft 1/2 in)
- Position: Right midfielder

Youth career
- Red Star Belgrade

Senior career*
Years	Team	Apps	(Gls)
2008–2011	Red Star Belgrade	2	(0)
2009	→ Sopot (loan)	13	(0)
2010	→ OFK Beograd (loan)	1	(0)
2010	→ Sopot (loan)	6	(0)
2011–2013	Rad	25	(0)
2013	→ Eskişehirspor (loan)	0	(0)
2013–2016	Spartak Subotica	72	(2)
2017–2018	Bežanija	26	(5)
2018	Poli Timișoara	5	(0)
Total		150	(7)

International career^{‡}
2013	Serbia U21	2	(0)
- * Club domestic league appearances and goals as of 9 December 2018 ‡ National team caps and goals as of 27 March 2013

Andrej Mrkela (Serbian Cyrillic: Андреј Мркела; born 9 April 1992) is a Serbian footballer.

Mrkela signed a one-year loan deal (with an option to buy) with Turkish Süper Lig giants Eskişehirspor on 26 December 2012. He was accompanied by the signing of Goran Čaušić on the same day.

== Personal life ==
He is the son of former footballer Mitar Mrkela and actress and politician Lidija Vukićević. He was born in Enschede, Netherlands, where his father played for FC Twente at the time.
