= Redemption Street =

- Serbian: Ustanička ulica
- Directed by: Miroslav Terzić
- Written by: Ðorde Milosavljević; Nikola Pejaković; Filip Švarm
- Produced by: Gordan Kičić
- Starring: Gordan Kičić; Uliks Fehmiu; Rade Šerbedžija; Petar Božović
- Production company: Kombajn Film
- Release date: 12 March 2012
- Running time: 91 minutes
- Country: Serbia
- Language: Serbian

Redemption Street (Serbian: Устаничка улица, romanized: Ustanička ulica) is a 2012 Serbian political thriller directed by Miroslav Terzić. The film's screenplay was co-written by Ðorđe Milosavljević and Nikola Pejaković with input from journalist Filip Švarm.

It premiered on 13 March 2012.

== Plot ==
Dušan Ilić (Gordan Kičić), employed at the Serbian state prosecutor's office, gets a top secret case to investigate a war crime committed during Yugoslav Wars by a disbanded paramilitary unit. He manages to find Mićun (Uliks Fehmiu) who's the only surviving witness.

== Cast ==
- Gordan Kičić as Dušan Ilić
- Uliks Fehmiu as Sredoje Govoruša a.k.a. Mićun Duvnjak
- Rade Šerbedžija as Vraneš
- Petar Božović as Grbavi

== Production ==
The movie's producer is Gordan Kičić through his production company Kombajn Film. He reportedly turned to Ustanička ulica after trying, and ultimately failing, to secure financing for two previous projects — film adaptations of Marko Vidojković's Kandže and Biljana Srbljanović's Beogradska trilogija.

The filming of Ustanička ulica started on 13 April 2011 and wrapped up on 4 June with 42 shooting days in total on locations in Belgrade, Vojvodina, and Golubac.

== Reaction ==
Watching Ustanička ulica prompted screenwriter and former film critic Dimitrije Vojnov into posting a scathing blog entry on the recent state of contemporary Serbian cinema and Serbian movie audiences' viewing habits, while also reviewing Ustanička ulica itself. He's of the opinion that Serbian film theatre audiences have been conditioned into rejecting ambitious and well-crafted cinematic projects, referring to it as a "crisis of reception on the part of Serbian audiences" and blaming it on "years of being submerged in the residue of Serbian anti-films that mock any film form or standards". He thus expressed concern that Ustanička ulica, "a movie that doesn't pander or resort to sensationalism, will be ignored by the audiences much like similarly ambitious and well-executed Dejan Zečević's Neprijatelj was last year".

== Critical reception ==
The film received mixed reviews.

Writing for web magazine Popboks, Đorđe Bajić opines that "despite being promoted as a provocative political film, it's hard to imagine Ustanička ulica generating any kind of political discussion", adding: "Yes, there are politics in this movie, but they've largely been marginalized and pushed to the side. Additionally, the film's politics have downright been rendered inconsequential by the screenplay gaffes". He further praises Miroslav Terzić's direction and Fehmiu's portrayal of Mićun/Sredoje, but has big problems with the "film's second-rate screenplay that seriously erodes its overall credibility", saying: "It's hard to believe such an ambitious film even went into production with a script full of glaring dramaturgical oversights and uneven parts, including one unbelievable and unnecessary coincidence, forced parallelism, numerous naivetés, mishandled characters, two-bit dialogues..."

Along similar lines, Dubravka Lakić of Politika praises the film's polished look ("brings American movies and television crime dramas to mind") and atmosphere in addition to Terzić's directorial skills as well as director of photography Miladin Čolaković's camera work, while having issues with the film's wider context and its screenplay. She disapproves of the "way the screenwriters divide Serbs in two groups by pinning the war crimes guilt squarely on Serbs from outside of Serbia, while absolving Serbs from Serbia of everything". Furthermore, she feels the screenplay is the movie's weakest link as it "contains script gaffes, dramaturgical oversights, as well as far too many coincidences, parallels, and arbitrary decisions, even occasional naive characterization with several characters completely mishandled".

Blic's Milan Vlajčić concludes his review by calling Ustanička ulica a "refreshing event that's worthy of careful viewing in the pretty precarious contemporary Serbian cinema". Before that, much like other reviewers, he singles out the director Terzić, cinematographer Čolaković, and actor Fehmiu for praise while criticizing the screenplay "whose arbitrary coincidences undermine the story's believability".
