= Dubravko Jovanović =

Serbian actor (born 1961)

Dubravko Jovanovic (Serbian Cyrillic: Дубравко Јовановић; born 11 January 1961 in Belgrade) is a Serbian actor. His credits includes roles in films like Beautiful Women Are Passing through City (Lijepe žene prolaze kroz grad), The Crusaders, Pretty Village, Pretty Flame and the science fiction TV series The Collector.
