= ZG80 =

- Directed by: Igor Šeregi
- Written by: Roberta Cukina; Ivo Balenović
- Produced by: Ljubo Zdjelarević
- Starring: Rene Bitorajac; Radovan Vujović; Domagoj Mrkonjić; Nikola Rakočević; Tarik Filipović
- Cinematography: Sven Pepeonik
- Music by: Hrvoje Prskalo
- Release date: 1 September 2016
- Running time: 1h 30min
- Countries: Croatia; Serbia
- Languages: Croatian; Serbian

ZG80 is a 2016 Croatian action-adventure film directed by Igor Šeregi set in 1989, and a prequel to Metastases. It is a dramatisation of the clashes at the derby between the supporters of Dinamo Zagreb and Red Star Belgrade. The film stars Rene Bitorajac returning as Krpa along with Marko Janketić, Filip Detelić, Igor Hamer and many others.

== Cast ==
- Rene Bitorajac - Krpa
- Matija Kačan - Filip
- Marko Cindrić - Kizo
- Filip Detelić - Buba
- Marko Janketić - Dejo
- Domagoj Mrkonjić - Žuti
- Nikola Rakočević - Peđa
- Miloš Timotijević - Rile
- Mijo Jurišić - Ićo
- Mario Petrekovic - Zlatkec
- Igor Hamer - Roko
