= Branka Veselinović =

Serbian actress (1918–2023)

- Бранка Веселиновић
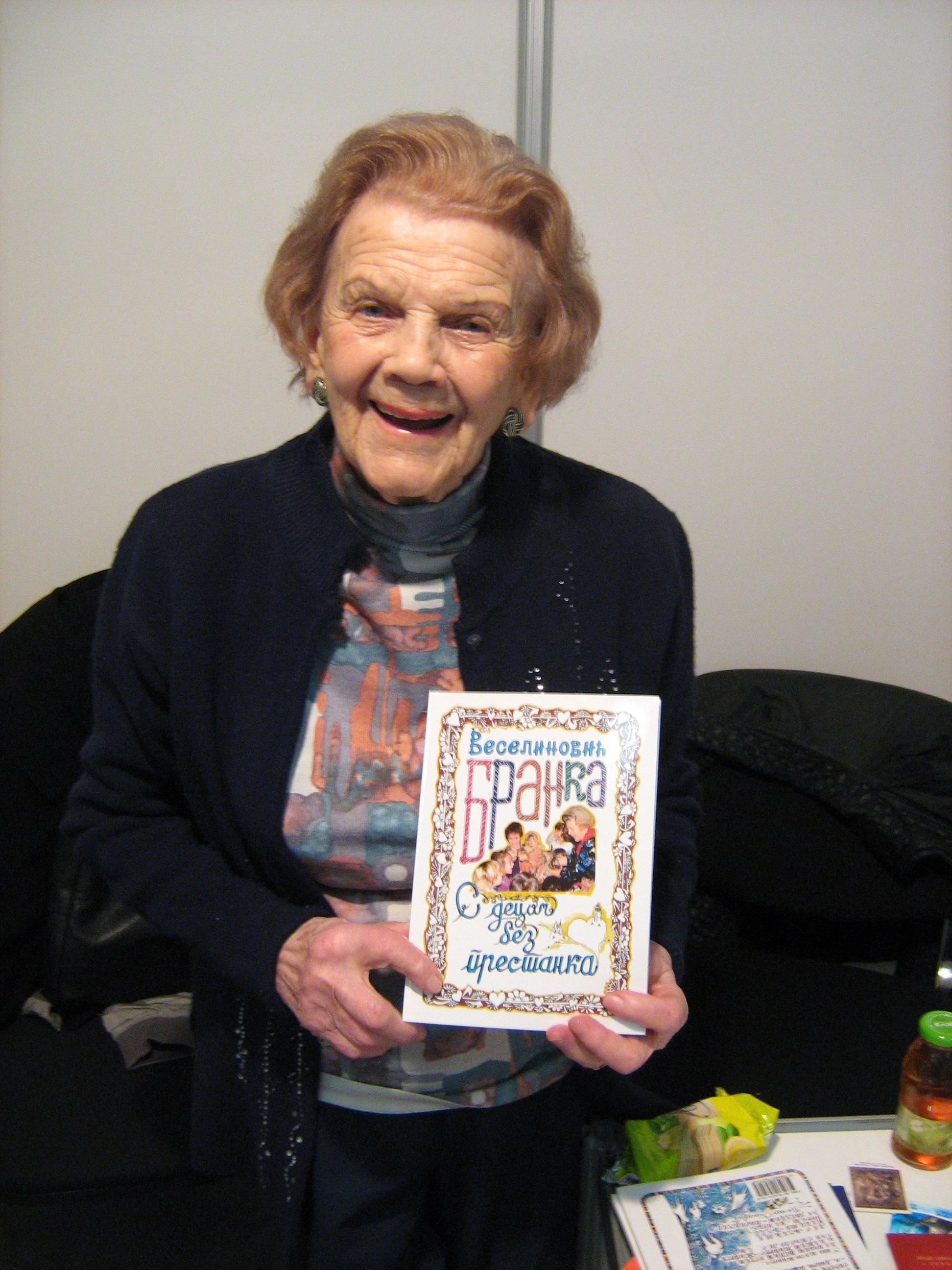
- Veselinović in 2012
- Born: Branka Ćosić; 16 September 1918; Óbecse, Austria-Hungary
- Died: 8 February 2023 (aged 104)
- Education: National Theatre in Belgrade; Serbian National Theatre
- Occupations: Actress; UNICEF ambassador
- Years active: 1938–2023
- Spouse: Mlađa Veselinović (m. 1948; died 2012)
- Awards: Sterija Award for Achievement in Acting (1964); Order of Labour; Branislav Nušić's award; Vuk Karadžić's award

Branka Veselinović (Serbian Cyrillic: Бранка Веселиновић; née Ćosić; 16 September 1918 – 8 February 2023) was a Serbian actress. Her acting career spanned over 80 years. Her career included 100 stage performances and 50 film and television productions. She was a UNICEF ambassador.

== Personal life ==
Branka Veselinović was born Branka Ćosić on 16 September 1918 in Óbecse, Austria-Hungary (now Bečej, Serbia). She was the sixth child of Aleksandar, a librarian, and his wife, Jovanka (née Monašević), a teacher. Her parents were accomplished in the artistic field, and she learnt to play the piano at an early age. She was also able to write verses and recite them with ease. She had six siblings.

Veselinović spoke Russian, English, German, Czech, Hungarian, Slovenian and Macedonian. She married actor and translator Mlađa Veselinović on 30 September 1948. They remained married until his death in 2012. She was a close friend of poet Desanka Maksimović and actor Mija Aleksić.

Veselinović died on 8 February 2023, at the age of 104. She was the second oldest living actress/celebrity in the world after American Elizabeth Waldo, born June 18, 1918.

== Career ==
=== Acting ===
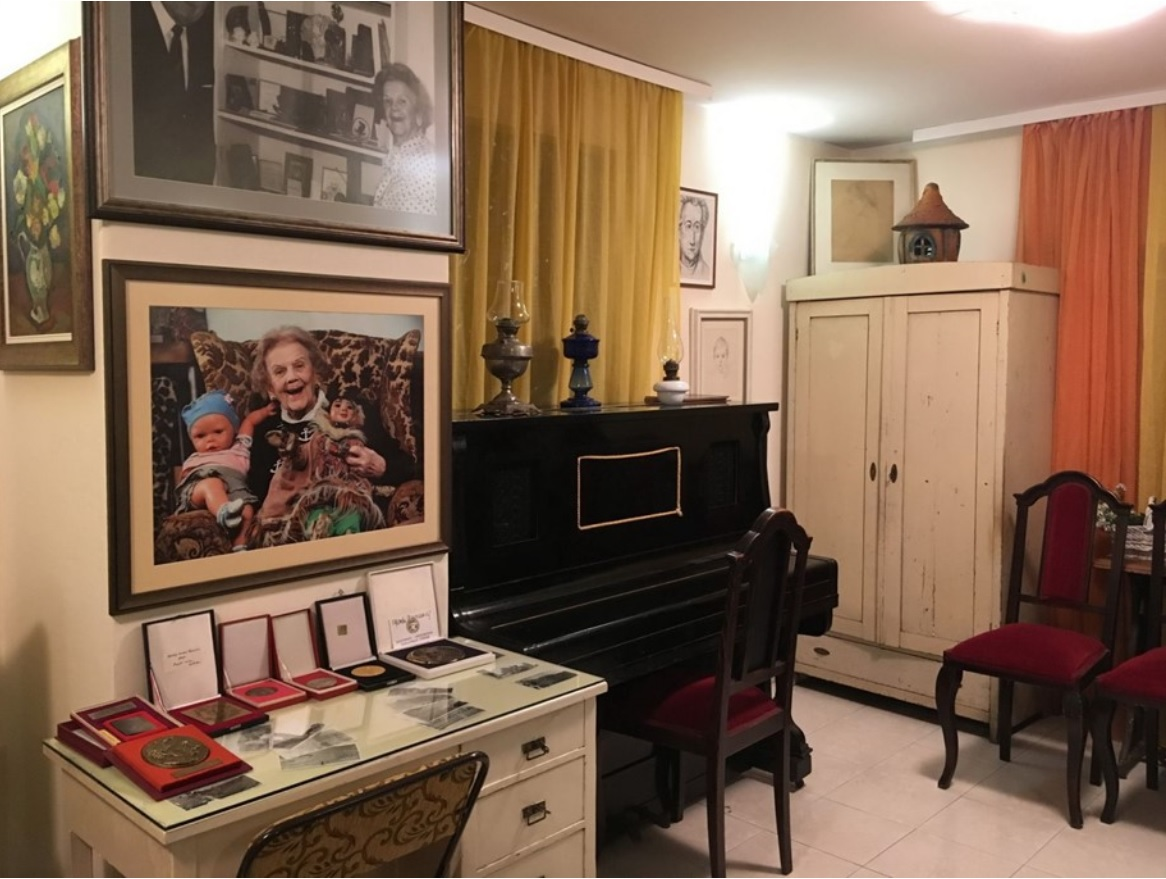
Veselinović's legacy in Adligat, Belgrade

Veselinović studied acting at National Theatre in Belgrade from 1936 until 1938. At the age of 19, she trained at the Serbian National Theatre in Novi Sad, where she made her debut as a stage actress in the play Charles' Aunt. She earned a reputation for her humorous and satirical roles. In 1940, she moved to Belgrade.

From 1940, she began to make a name for herself by appearing in numerous stage performances across different theatres in Belgrade. Between 1940 and 1978, she was cast in several performances at the Art Theater (1940–1942), the National Theater (1944–1947), and the Yugoslav Drama Theater (1947–1978), with over 40 stage performances at the latter. On 3 April 1948, she appeared in the first stage performance at the Yugoslav Drama Theatre, in the play King Betajnova. In the United States, she played the main character in the English-language play Mother Courage. In 1970, she appeared in Mel Brooks's film adaptation of The Twelve Chairs. She later appeared in Three Sisters (1982), Russian Tzar (1993), Ljubav, navika, panika (2005), Peasants (2006), and Emergency Room (2014).

Veselinović had over 100 stage performances and 50 film and television productions. An award named after her was established in 2012, with actors such as Nebojša Glogovac, Vojin Ćetković, and Seka Sablić receiving it. Veselinović turned 100 in September 2018. She was the oldest living actress in Serbia and still performed until her death in 2023.

=== Humanitarian ===
Veselinović became an ambassador of UNICEF in 1980. With her husband Mlađa, she headed the Branka and Mlađa Veselinović Fund to help disabled children.

== Awards ==
In 1964, she received the Sterija Award for playing the role of Gina in Branislav Nušić's Bereaved Family. She was also awarded with the Order of Labour with golden wreath, Branislav Nušić's award, and Vuk Karadžić's award. She was the honorary resident of Belgrade, Novi Sad, and the Children's Village near Sremska Kamenica.
