= Seven and a Half (2006 film) =

2006 film

- Film poster
- Directed by: Miroslav Momčilović
- Written by: Miroslav Momčilović
- Starring: Branislav Trifunović; Marija Karan; Gordan Kičić; Milan Gutović; Mira Stupica; Nikola Đuričko
- Release date: 2006
- Running time: 106 minutes
- Country: Serbia
- Language: Serbian

Seven and a Half (Serbian: Sedam i po, Serbian Cyrillic: Седам и по) is a 2006 Serbian dark comedy film directed by Miroslav Momčilović.

== Plot ==
The film shows the everyday lives of people in Belgrade who are obsessed with their weaknesses and led by their passions. Seven independent stories on the seven deadly sins are told in a comical tone.

Greed: Keboja and Radule hatch a scheme to extract money from Diego Maradona by asking him to financially help them out with a fake health problem. However, the amount of money they are going to ask for keeps rising, side by side with their greed and plans for the future.

Wrath: Tadija is a bodybuilder with a sole goal to get revenge against a convict who embarrassed him five years ago.

Lust: Obrad and Radoje are two pedophiles who meet when they get in touch over e-mail, both posing as little girls.

Gluttony: Adam and Verica are frequent visitors of events with free food and drinks where they eat and drink as much as they can. Their gluttony leads them to an event with interesting food.

Pride: Srđan and Zorica are a married couple who are 3 questions away from the prize in a quiz worth 4 million Serbian dinars. However, Zorica can't acknowledge the fact that her husband is the only one answering the questions, who seemingly knows everything.

Sloth: Simka and Konda are two thieves trying to rob a flat after the owners leave. Elevators in the building don't work, so they have to climb 23 floors which proves to be too much for them.

Envy: Musa and Banjac (who both also appear in the first 2 stories, sitting in the same place) envy Bure, a Bosnian emigrant, for owning a restaurant and driving a good looking Mercedes. They provoke him until a tragedy happens to Bure.

== Cast ==
- Branislav Trifunović - Keboja
- Nikola Vujović - Radule
- Miloš Timotijević - Tadija
- Marija Karan - Koviljka
- Branko Vidaković - Obrad
- Boris Komnenić - Radoje
- Nenad Jezdić - Adam
- Gordan Kičić - Srdjan
- Natasa Marković - Verica
- Ljubinka Klarić - Zorica
- Milan Gutović - Voditelj
- Nikola Đuričko - Simke
- Boris Milivojević - Konda
- Mira Stupica - Milica
