= Offenders (2017 film) =

2017 film

- Film poster
- Directed by: Dejan Zečević
- Written by: Djordje Milosavljevic
- Starring: Radovan Vujovic
- Release date: 22 October 2017 (Chicago IFF)
- Running time: 107 minutes
- Country: Serbia
- Language: Serbian

Offenders (Serbian: Izgrednici) is a 2017 Serbian drama film directed by Dejan Zečević. It was selected as the Serbian entry for the Best Foreign Language Film at the 91st Academy Awards, but it was not nominated.

== Cast ==
- Radovan Vujović as Aleksandar
- Mladen Sovilj as Danijel
- Marta Bjelica as Teodora
- Svetozar Cvetković as Professor Slavko Zurovac

== See also ==
- List of submissions to the 91st Academy Awards for Best Foreign Language Film
- List of Serbian submissions for the Academy Award for Best Foreign Language Film
