= Zoran Radmilović Award =

Serbian dramatic arts award

- Country: Serbia
- Presented by: Sterijino Theatre
- First award: 1988

The Zoran Radmilović Award (Serbian: Награда Зоран Радмиловић, romanized: Nagrada Zoran Radmilović) is an award presented by the Sterijino Theatre in Novi Sad, Serbia to actors predominating in dramatic arts.

The award is presented annually, since 1988. From its debut, it is considered one of the most prominent awards within Serbian theatre. The award itself is a bronze figure of Zoran Radmilović, an eminent Serbian theatre, television and film actor of the 20th century.

== Laureats ==
Year	Recipient	Role	Production
1988	Milan Gutović	Uče	Ruženje naroda u dva dela
1989	Lazar Ristovski	Pavao	Original falsifikata
1990	Žarko Laušević	Andreja	Kanjoš Macedonović
1991	Anica Dobra	Nevena	Urnebesna tragedija
1992	Branimir Brstina	Gaius Marcius Coriolanus	Coriolanus
1993	Lidija Stevanović	Mirandoline	Mirandoline
1994	Dragan Mićanović	Pomet Trpeza	Dundo Maroje
1995	Goran Šušljik	Torquato Tasso	Torquato Tasso
1996	Rastko Lupulović	Timon	Timon of Athens
1997	Branimir Popović	Iago	Othello
1998	Sergej Trifunović	Nebojša	Folkeri iz raja
1999	Anita Mančić	Marina	Karolina Nojber
2000	Nebojša Dugalić	Mamerko	Kocka iz Kartage
2001	Nebojša Glogovac	Kiklop	Sanda
2002	Milica Mihajlović	Gospava	Čudo u Šarganu
2003	Jelena Đokić	Ateh	Hazarski rečnik
2004	Aleksandra Janković	Irene	America: Volume II
2005	Nenad Jezdić	Lepi Dule	Smrtonosna motoristika
2006	Ivan Bosiljčić	Don Krsto	Don Krsto
2007	Jasna Đuričić	The Mother	Ja ili neko drugi
2008	Ljubomir Bandović	Chafa	Chafa
2009	Nada Šargin	Rose	Nevinost
2010	Gordan Kičić	Wolf	Hair
2011	Nikola Đuričko	Publius Ovidius Naso	Metamorphoses
2012	Hana Selimović	Sena Zolj	Otac na službenom putu
2013	Slobodan Stefanović	Manulaća	Zona Zamfirova
2014	Goran Jevtić	Roger	Noises Off
2015	Branislav Lečić	Pericles	Pericles
2016	Miloš Samolov	Kijan	Vuksha & Kijan
2017	Boris Milivojević	Macbeth	Macbeth
2018	Katarina Žutić	Frosine	The Miser
2019	Rade Šerbedžija	George	Who's Afraid of Virginia Woolf?

== Zoranov brk ==
There is also a special award, Zoranov brk (Zoran's Moustache), linked with this award.
