= Goran Daničić =

Serbian actor (1962–2021)

- Горан Даничић
- Born: 14 December 1962; Titovo Užice, SFR Yugoslavia
- Died: 10 February 2021 (aged 58); Belgrade, Serbia
- Occupation: Actor
- Years active: 1982–2021

Goran Daničić (Serbian Cyrillic: Горан Даничић; 14 December 1962 – 10 February 2021) was a Serbian actor. He appeared in more than fifty films since 1982.

== Selected filmography ==
Year	Title	Role	Notes
2005	Ivko's Feast		
2004	When I Grow Up, I'll Be a Kangaroo		
2004	Robbery of the Third Reich		
2002	Novogodišnje venčanje		
2002	Mala noćna muzika		
1994	Vukovar, jedna priča		
1989	The Meeting Point		
