= Mlađa Veselinović =

Serbian actor and translator (1915–2012)

- Born: 21 April 1915; Kragujevac, Serbia
- Died: 27 December 2012 (aged 97); Belgrade, Serbia
- Occupation(s): Actor, translator
- Spouse: Branka Veselinović (m. 1948)

Mlađa Veselinović (21 April 1915 – 27 December 2012) was a Serbian actor and translator.

== Biography ==
Veselinovic was born in Kragujevac, Serbia. He was a member of the Yugoslav Drama Theatre from its founding in 1947, and made his début in the theater play "King Betajnove". He has collaborated with the biggest names and directing made about what the role on the stage of the Yugoslav Drama Theater. He acted in the films The Magic Sword (1950), La tempesta (1950), Professor Kosta Vujic's Hat (1972), Otpisani (1974). He died on 27 December 2012, at the age of 97, in Belgrade.

Veselinović married fellow Serbian actress Branka Veselinović on 30 September 1948, and they remained married until his death.
