= Domagoj Mrkonjić =

Croatian actor

- Born: 18 July 1988 (age 36); Osijek, SR Croatia, SFR Yugoslavia
- Occupation: actor
- Years active: 2012–present

Domagoj Mrkonjić (born 18 July 1988) is a Croatian actor and university lecturer. One of his most prominent roles is that of Dinamo Zagreb supporter 'Žuti' in the Croatian action-adventure sport film ZG80. He is also writer, producer and director.

== Controversies ==
On 28 January 2025, students of the Academy of Arts and Culture in Osijek, where Mrkonjić is a lecturer, organized a protest and 5 minutes of silence against Mrkonjić, who was accused of violent and inappropriate behavior towards students and being under the influence of alcohol and drugs during class. Mrkonjić was first ordered to quit his position at the Academy by the Disciplinary Committee, but issued a complaint, which was accepted by the Academy's Complaints Committee due to the lecturer being "under stress". The Complaints Committee ultimately decided to issue a final warning to Mrkonjić and suspend him until October 2025, which students claimed isn't sufficient considering the accusations levvied against him. The students called for an indefinite suspension pending conclusions from police and State Attorney's Office investigations. The protest garnered support from students of the Academy of Dramatic Art in Zagreb, the Academy of Applied Arts in Rijeka and the Art Academy in Split.
