= Goran Jevtić (actor) =

Serbian actor and director

- Горан Јевтић
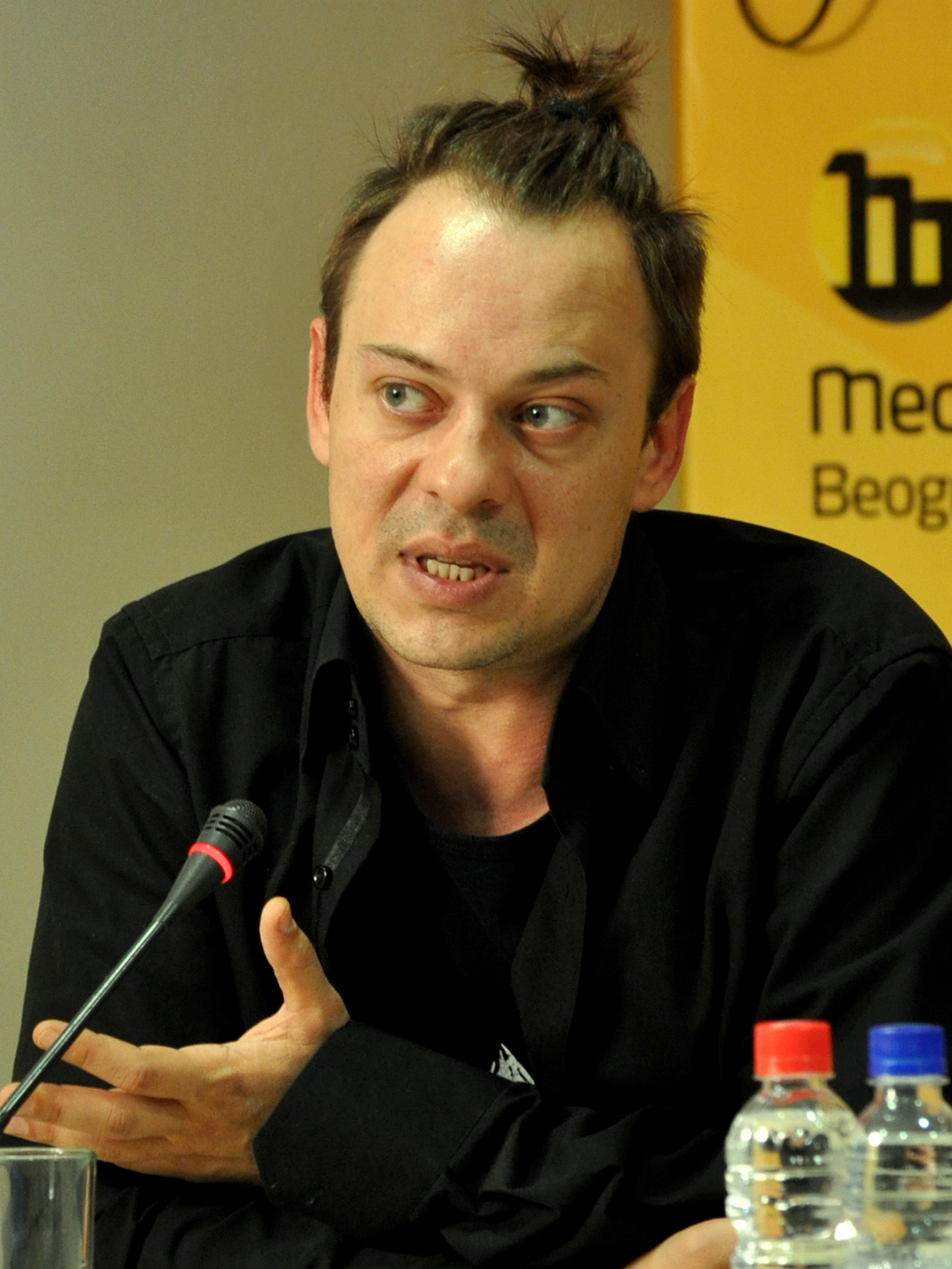
- Jevtić in April 2014
- Born: 18 January 1978 (age 48); Mladenovac, SR Serbia, SFR Yugoslavia
- Education: Faculty of Dramatic Arts
- Alma mater: University of Arts in Belgrade
- Occupation: Actor
- Years active: 1998–present

Goran Jevtić (Serbian Cyrillic: Горан Јевтић; born 18 January 1978) is a Serbian television, film, theater actor and director. During his decades long career, Jevtić has composed a prolific range of performances notable in film, television and theater.

He is the recipient of various accolades, including the Ljubinka Bobić Award, the Zoran Radmilović Award, the Miloš Žutić Award, three Serbian Oscars of Popularity and four Ardalion Awards, as well as a Golden Arena for Best Supporting Actor nomination for his work in The Parade.

In October 2019, the Court of Appeals in Sombor convicted Jevtić of illegal sexual acts against a teenage male. He was sentenced to a ten-month house arrest instead of a prison sentence. The conviction was upheld in March 2020.

== Early life and career ==
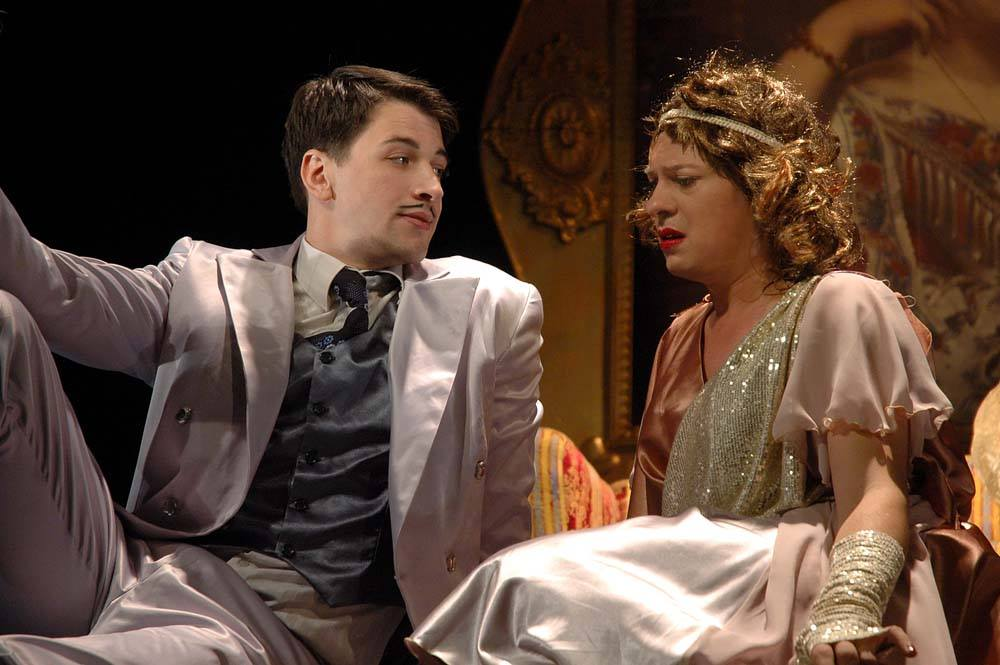
Jevtić with Viktor Savić

Jevtić was born in the settlement of Kovačevac in Mladenovac, SFR Yugoslavia. He began acting in 1998, and was since active in the Atelje 212 theatre in Belgrade. In 2001, he graduated from the Belgrade Academy of Dramatic Arts. A student of Biljana Mašić, his first role was Euclio in Aulularia. He later landed lead roles in various theatre productions, for which he earned numerous awards. His Shakespearean interpretations in European-based theatres include Romeo Montague in Romeo and Juliet in Verona, Macbeth in Macbeth in Zagreb, Prince Hamlet in Hamlet in Belgrade, Antonio in The Merchant of Venice in Rome and Gaius Marcius Coriolanus in Coriolanus.

For his performance in Okamenjeni princ in the Duško Radović theatre, he received the Miloš Žutić Award. As Prince Hamlet in Hamlet, he won the Ardalion and the Serbian Oscar of Popularity in 2011. He was awarded the Serbian Oscar of Popularity again for his Romeo Montague interpretation at the Novi Sad Serbian National Theatre. The Noises Off rendition gained him a Zoran Radmilović Award and Ljubinka Bobić Award in 2014. He has taken part in over sixty international film and theatre festivals, and has completed over one hundred performances in the Atelje 212 theatre. He has performed in Moscow, London, Verona, Rome, Split, Budapest, Dresden, Vienna and Zagreb. In 2018, he starred as Friedrich Nietzsche in his directorial debut Kad je Niče zaplakao at Atelje 212.

He further rose to continental prominence as homosexual activist Mirko Dedijer, in the 2011 Festroia Award-winning film The Parade. The film by Srđan Dragojević reached commercial success, despite the controversial subject, and critics praised Jevtić's portrayal. Other than his role in The Parade, he actively appeared in the We're Not Angels films as fictional Leskovac native Andreja and played the supporting role of Mitar in the 2011 American war film In the Land of Blood and Honey directed by Angelina Jolie. He won the Apolon Prize in Belgrade for his role as Miloš in Life Is a Miracle entered into the 2004 Cannes Film Festival. He starred as Dane in the Srđan Dragojević production Sveti Georgije ubija aždahu in 2008, and in Na lijepom plavom Dunavu in 2009 as Jacek.

His repertoire on television includes Sisyphus in The Myth of Sisyphus from 2009 to 2011, cameo roles in Porodično blago, the secondary character Nebojša in Era Ojdanic - Samo Era from 2008 to 2012, and Djoni in The Mask.

== Sexual offence legal issues ==
In March 2019, the Court of Appeals in Sombor convicted Jevtić of illegal sexual acts against a 16 year old teenage male. Initially sentenced to ten months under house arrest, Jevtić's sentence was changed to ten months in prison in October 2019 following his appeal. However, a final verdict reversed the sentence and Jevtić began serving his sentence under house arrest in June 2020.

== Filmography ==
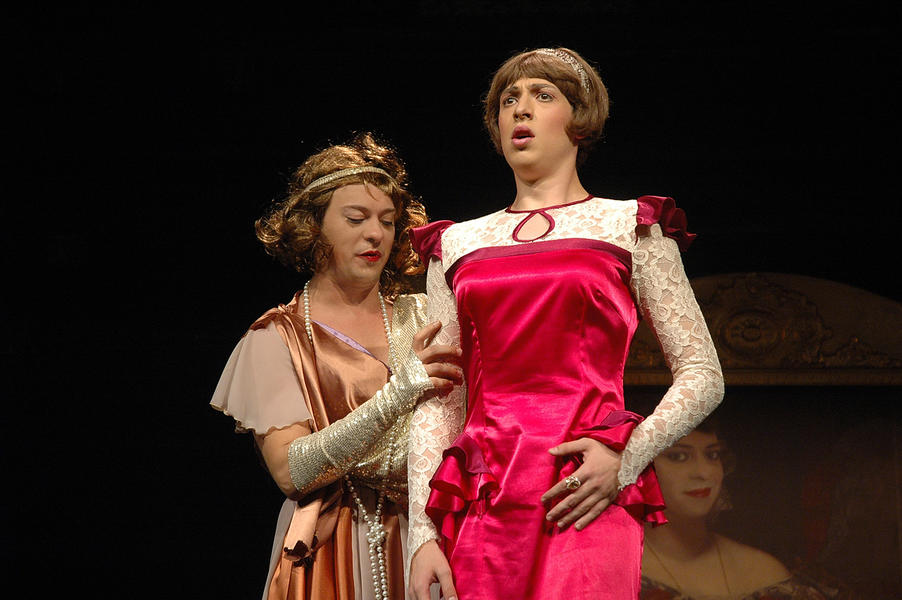
Jevtić with Nebojša Milovanović

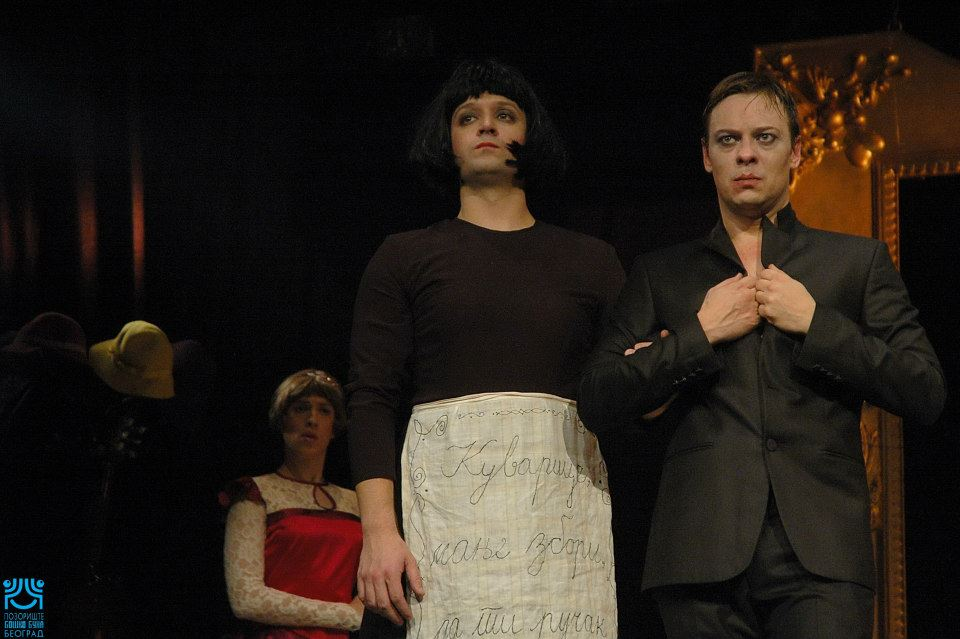
Jevtić performing as Gospodja Ministarka

=== Film roles ===
Year	Title	Role	Notes
1998	Film iznenađenja	Goran	Short film; producer
2000	Land of Truth, Love and Freedom	Goran	Main role
2001	Ona voli Zvezdu	Grašak	Main role
2002	Novogodišnje venčanje	Nemanja	Main role
2003	Mansarda	Petar Peđa	Supporting role
2003	Kuća sreće	Grašak	Minor role
2003	Dobre namere	Nikola	Cameo
2004	Život je čudo	Miloš	Main role
2005	Mi nismo anđeli 2	Andreja	Main role
2006	Mi nismo anđeli 3: Rokenrol uzvraća udarac	Andreja, Koks	Main role
2007	Mile protiv tranzicije	Mile	Main role; producer
2007	Maska	Jean	Cameo
2008	Na lijepom plavom Dunavu	Jacek	Main role
2008	Sveti Georgije ubiva aždahu	Dane	Main role
2009	Pada kiša u Rolan Garosu	Filomen	Supporting role
2009	Đavolja varoš	Filomen	Supporting role
2011	Parade	Mirko	Main role
2011	In the Land of Blood and Honey	Mitar	Supporting role
2013	Ljubav dolazi kasnije	The Ex	Main role

=== Television roles ===
Year	Title	Role	Notes
2001	Porodično blago	Police officer	Episode: Vanja smara
2008-2012	Samo Era	Nebojša	Secondary character; 5 episodes
2009-2011	The Myth of Sisyphus	Sisyphus	Main role, 20 episodes
2009	Naša mala klinika	Burglar	Episode: Novi Portir
2010	Veče sa Ivanom Ivanovićem	Himself	Guest
2017-2018	Komšije	Bob Stanković	Supporting role, 10 episode
2021	Nečista krv	Paraputa	6 episodes
2024	Pasjača		Supporting role

=== Voice-over roles ===
Year	Title	Role
2002	Aladdin	Genie
2002	The Return of Jafar	Genie
2002	Little Mermaid	Sebastian
2002	The Lion King	Banzai
2002	The Emperor's New Groove	Kuzco
2003	Monsters, Inc.	Randall Boggs
2003	Finding Nemo	Crush
2004	Alice in Wonderland	Cheshire Cat
2005	Chicken Little	Runt of the Litter
2005	Madagascar	Marty
2005	The Jungle Book	King Louie
2005	Valiant	Bugsy
2005	Home on the Range	Rusty
2006	Open Season	Elliot
2006	Ice Age: The Meltdown	Crash
2006	Over the Hedge	RJ
2007	Bee Movie	Barry Benson
2007	Ratatouille	Pompidou
2007	The Simpsons Movie	Reverend Lovejoy
2008	Kung Fu Panda	Master Crane
2008	Madagascar: Escape 2 Africa	Marty
2008	Horton Hears a Who!	The Chairman
2009	Ice Age: Dawn of the Dinosaurs	Crash
2009	Monsters Versus Aliens	Dr. Cockroach
2009	The Princess and the Frog	James
2010	Shrek Forever After	Rumpelstiltskin
2010	Beauty and the Beast	Lumière
2010	Tangled	Big Nose Thug
2011	Kung Fu Panda 2	Master Crane
2012	Madagascar 3: Europe's Most Wanted	Marty
2012	Wreck-It Ralph	King Candy/Turbo
2012	Hotel Transylvania	Quasimodo
2012	Ice Age: Continental Drift	Crash
2013	Monsters University	Randall Boggs
2016	Kung Fu Panda 3	Master Crane
2016	Ice Age: Collision Course	Crash
2018	The Grinch	The Grinch

== Awards and nominations ==
Year	Award	Category	Film	Result
2002	Ardalion Award	Best Actor	Demons	Won
2003	Ardalion Award	Best Actor	Elephants in Belgrade	Won
2004	Apollon Prize	Best Actor	Life Is a Miracle	Won
2005	Miloš Žutić Award	Best Actor in a Play	Okamenjeni princ	Won
2005	Zoran Radmilović Award	Best Actor in a Play	Okamenjeni princ	Nominated
2008	Zoran Radmilović Award	Best Actor in a Play	Timon of Athens	Nominated
2009	Serbian Oscar of Popularity	Best Stage Actor	Timon of Athens	Won
2011	Ardalion Award	Best Stage Actor	Hamlet	Won
2011	Serbian Oscar of Popularity	Best Theatrical Performance	Hamlet	Won
2011	Golden Arena	Best Actor	The Parade	Nominated
2013	Ardalion Award	Best Actor	Romeo and Juliet	Won
2013	Serbian Oscar of Popularity	Best Stage Actor	Romeo and Juliet	Won
2014	Zoran Radmilovic Award	Best Actor in a Play	Noises Off	Won
2014	Ljubinka Bobić Award	Best Stage Actor	Noises Off	Won
