= Hristić =

Hristić is a surname. People with the surname include:

- Jovan Hristić, a Serbian poet
- Stevan Hristić, a Serbian composer and conductor
- Zoran Hristić, a Serbian composer
- Filip Hristić, a Serbian politician
- Nikola Hristić, a Serbian politician
- Kosta Hristić, a Serbian politician
