= Dragomir Čumić =

Serbian actor

Dragomir "Drago" Čumić (Serbian Cyrillic: Драгомир "Драго" Чумић; 8 May 1937 in Sirač near Daruvar, Kingdom of Yugoslavia – 10 November 2013 in Belgrade, Serbia) was a Serbian actor. His credits includes roles in the TV series Bolji život and The Collector, which is said to be the first Serbian science fiction television series.
