= Bernardo Bobić =

- Born: Unknown
- Died: c. 1694; Zagreb, Kingdom of Croatia within Habsburg monarchy
- Known for: Painting
- Movement: Baroque

Bernardo Bobić (Bubich, Budich) (died c. 1695, in Zagreb) was a Croatian baroque painter and gilder. He was mainly active in Zagreb and the surrounding areas.

== Works ==
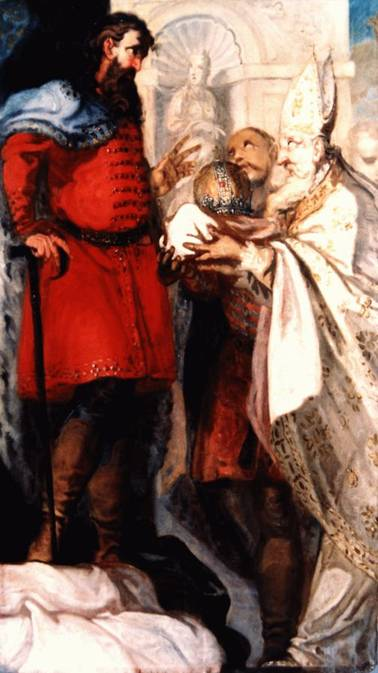
Painting from the altar of St. Ladislaus in Zagreb, Croatia

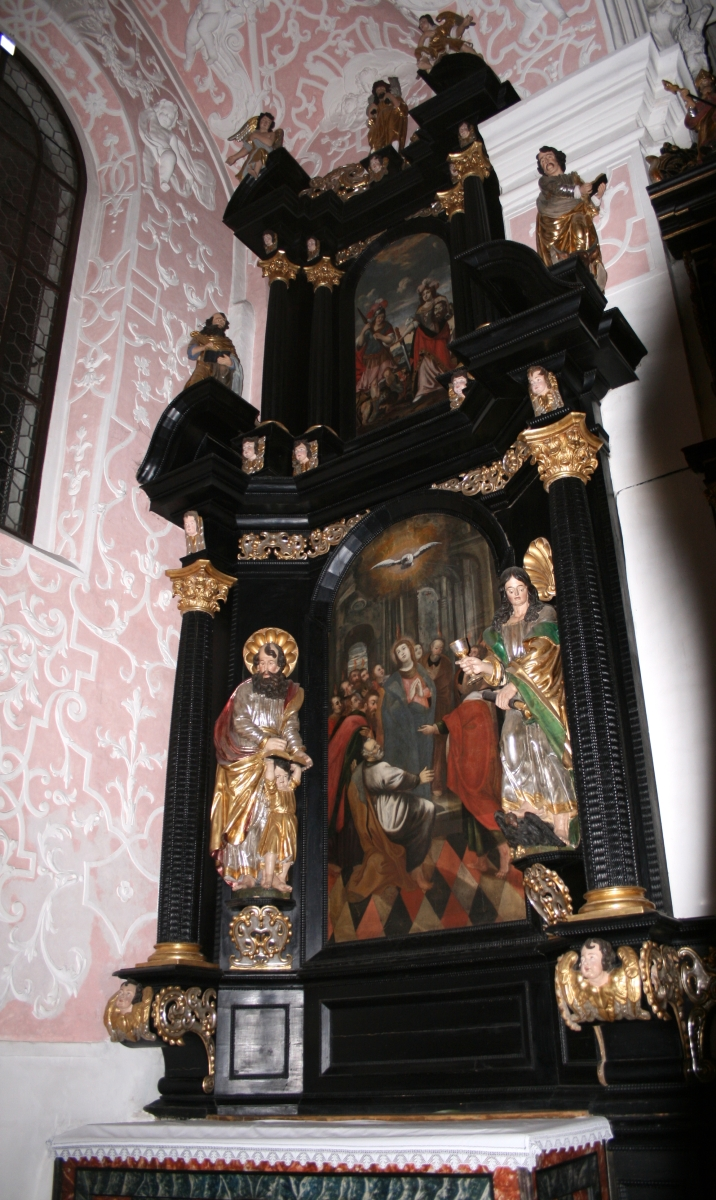
Altar paintings from St. Catherine's Church, Zagreb - 1683
