= Svetislav Goncić =

Serbian actor

- Светислав Гонцић
- Born: 5 May 1960 (age 66); Kladovo, PR Serbia, FPR Yugoslavia
- Other name: Bule
- Occupation: Actor
- Years active: 1971–present

Svetislav "Bule" Goncić (Serbian Cyrillic: Светислав "Буле" Гонцић; born 5 May 1960) is a Serbian actor. He has appeared in more than seventy films since 1971. Svetislav Goncić is General Manager in National Theatre in Belgrade.

== Selected filmography ==
Film
Year	Title	Role	Note	1987–1990	Hajde da se volimo
1987	Oktoberfest				
2010	Cirkus Columbia				

TV
Year	Title	Role	Notes
1975–1976	Salaš u Malom Ritu		
1987	Escape from Sobibor		
2002	Novogodišnje venčanje		
2008–2011	Selo gori, a baba se češlja		
