= Saša Torlaković =

Serbian actor

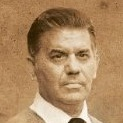
- Born: 1965 (age 60–61); Jagodina, Serbia
- Occupation: actor
- Years active: 1989-present

Aleksandar "Saša" Torlaković (born 1965 in Jagodina) is a Serbian theater actor.

== Biography ==
Torlaković was born in 1965 and completed the gymnasium in his hometown of Jagodina. He studied at the Academy of Arts in Novi Sad, in the class of professor Branko Pleša. After the studies, in 1989 he joined the National Theatre of Sombor and has been the member of its ensemble since, as well its art director since 2017.

== Accolades ==
Selected accolades:

- 2002 Sterija's Award for Best Male Actor in Opsada Crkve svetog Spasa.
- 2013 Sterija's Award for Best Male Actor for the role of Thomas Mann in Čarobnjak (Wizard).
- 2013 "Milivoje Živanović" award for Čarobnjak at the 23rd Actors' Celebrations in Požarevac.
- 2018 "Milivoje Živanović" award for the role of Agaton Arsić in Ožalošćena porodica.
- 2010 Best Actor award at the Tvrđava Teatar festival in Smederevo for the role of Luka in Kate Kapuralica.
- Four "Ćuran" awards on the "Comedy Days" festival in Jagodina
