= Branko Mihaljević Children's Theatre =

Theatre in Croatia

Coordinates: 45°33′19.12″N 18°43′13.26″E

- Interactive map of Branko Mihaljević Children's Theatre
- Address: 19 Ban Josip Jelačić Square; Osijek; Croatia
- Type: Children's theatre

Construction
- Years active: 1950-present

Website
- www.djecje-kazaliste.hr

Branko Mihaljević Children's Theatre (Croatian: Dječje kazalište Branka Mihaljevića) is a theatre located in Osijek, Croatia.
