= Plaut =

Plaut is a surname, and may refer to:

- Gunther Plaut, American reform rabbi
- Jonathan V. Plaut, American reform rabbi
- Karl Plauth, German flying ace of WWI
- Richard Plant, American writer (born Plaut)
- Steven Plaut, Israeli academic
