= Ljubinka Bobić Award =

Serbian award for comedy writers

- Country: Serbia
- Presented by: Union of Serbian Dramatists
- First award: 2006

The Ljubinka Bobić Award is a Serbian-based award given to critically and commercially successful actors, excelling in comedy, since 2006. The award, presented by the Union of Serbian Dramatists, is named after Ljubinki Bobić, an acclaimed 20th-century actress notable for performances in theatre, film and television.

The first laureate of the award is Jelisaveta Seka Sablić, for the role of Majka Dara in the comedy Svinjski otac, directed by Aleksandar Popović in the Krusovice theatre.

Anita Mančić won the award for her praised role as Dorine in the Egon Savin-directed production of Tartuffe by Molière at the Yugoslav Drama Theatre.

In 2011, Danijel Sič, for his role in the Pedro Almodóvar production of All About My Mother in the Belgrade Theatre, won the award.

The fourth recipient of the prominent award, Goran Jevtić won the award for his performance in Michael Frayn's Towards the End of the Morning, featuring the directorial debut of Jug Radivojević in the "Boško Buha" theatre in Belgrade.

In 2016, the award was presented for a fifth time to winner Olga Odanović won for her performance as Janja in White Coffee by Aleksandar Popović.

The most recent winner, Branislav Lečić won for Harpagon in Marko Janjić-directed version of Moliere's The Miser.
