= Zoranov brk award =

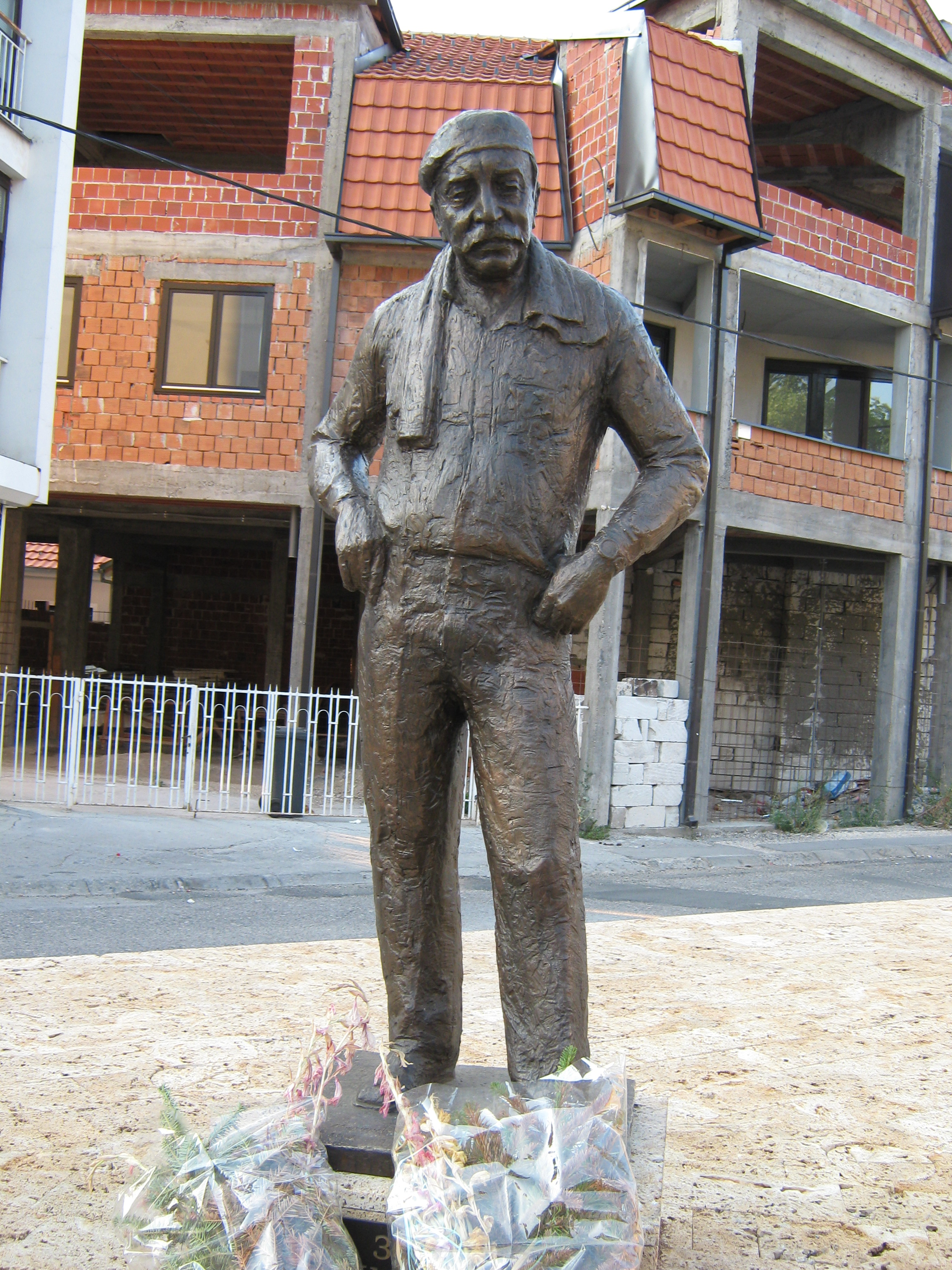
Monument to Zoran Radmilović in Zaječar, his hometown

The "Zoranov brk" (Zoran's moustache) award is given to the best actors during the event called "The days of Zoran Radmilović" (Serbian: "Dani Zorana Radmilovića") in the city of Zaječar, Serbia.

The jury that presents this award consists of renowned journalists. In the birthplace of famous Serbian actor Zoran Radmilović, there is an annual event in his honor, which promotes "the art of acting".

The 15th "Days" took place in the restored theatre building of Zaječar in 2006.

== Laureates ==
- 2002 - Petar Kralj, for the role of Nikola Kos in the play "Doctor Shuster" (Zvezdara teatar)
- 2003 - Petar Božović, for the role of father Ubu in the play "Ubu roi" (Royal theatre Zetski dom Cetinje)
- 2006 - Josif Tatić, for the role of the father in the play "Huddersfield"
- 2009 - Nikola Ristanovski, for the role of Ahmad Nurudin in the play "Death and the Dervish" (National Theatre in Belgrade)
- 2010 - Branimir Brstina, for the roles of captain, businessman, psychiatrist and lawyer in the play "General rehearsal of a suicide" (Zvezdara teatar)
- 2011 - Vlastimir Đuza Stojiljković, for the role of Dino in the play "When Father Was Away on Business" (Atelje 212)
- 2012 - Ivan Bekjarev, for the role of Vasilije Šopalović in the play "Travelling theater Šopalović"
- 2013 - Jelisaveta Orašanin, for the role of Berta in the play "Boing boing" (Zvezdara teatar)
- 2014 - Igor Đorđević, for the role of Martin, Richie and Dejan in the play "Bizarre" (National Theatre in Belgrade)
- 2015 - Vanja Ejdus, for the role of Ružica Church in the play "White coffee" (National Theatre in Belgrade)
- 2016 - Branimir Brstina, for the role of Duncan in the play "Macbeth" (Atelje 212)
- 2017 - Svetlana Bojković, for the role of Dragica in the play "You're mine" (Atelje 212)
- 2018 - Nela Mihailović
- 2019 - Andrija Kuzmanović
- 2020 - Boris Isaković
