= Ljubinka Bobić =

Serbian actress (1897–1978)

Ljubinka Bobic
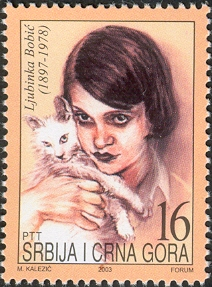
- Ljubinka Bobić on a stamp
- Born: 21 January 1897; Kruševac, Serbia
- Died: 3 December 1978 (aged 81); Belgrade, Yugoslavia
- Occupation: Actor
- Years active: 1951–1975

Ljubinka Bobić (2 January 1897 – 3 December 1978) was a Yugoslav actress. She appeared in more than fifteen films from 1951 to 1975.

== Biography ==
She was born in Kruševac in a poor family with five children. Her brother Miroljub Bobić, a teacher, is one of 1300 Corporals and a holder of Alban memorial. Her father, Vladislav, a cobbler, was from Srem (Sremski Golubinci), and her mother Jelisaveta was from Macedonia (Struga). They moved to Topčider hill where Ljubinka grew up. Theatre attracted her and with her persistence she became a member of the National Theatre group. Her talent was discovered by Branislav Nušić in 1915 in Skopje where she had been sent to live with her relatives during World War I.

Although she never married, she was romantically involved with the director of "Politika" newspaper Vlada Ribnikar, writer Miloš Crnjanski and Rade Drainac. She was buried in the Alley of deserving citizens on the New Graveyard in Belgrade. A stamp with her silhouette was published in 2003. "Ljubinka Bobić" award was established in 2006.

== Selected filmography ==
Year	Title	Role	Notes
1975	Devil's ladder, TV show (Vladan Slijepčević)	old woman	
1975	Pavle Pavlović, drama (Mladomir "Puriša" Đorđević)	disco house director	
1973	Accident, TV movie (Vladan Slijepčević)		
1972	Laughter from scene: National theatre, documentary	Živka Popović	
1971	My all, mini TV show (producer – Sava Mrmak, script – Novak Novak)		
1969	Cross Country (Mladomir "Puriša" Đorđević)	grandmother	
1966	The Climber	owner	
1964	National representative, movie (Stole Janković)	Spirinica	
1962	Koštana		
1962	Dr. (Soja Jovanović)	Mrs. Draga	
1961	First citizen of little city, drama (Mladomir "Puriša" Đorđević)	a magician	
1960	Zeppelin of dreams (Soja Jovanović)	Sara Padavicki	
1957	Priests Ćira and Spira (Soja Jovanović)	Sida	
1954	Legends of Anika (Vladimir Pogačić)	Jelenka	
1951	Major Boggart (Nikola Popović)	grandmother	

== Literary work ==
Bobić wrote a few popular humoristic satirical pieces:

- Our manners: comedy in three acts, 1935.
- Classy society, innocuous comedy in three acts, 1936.
- Blo family, comedy in three acts, 1940.

== Awards ==
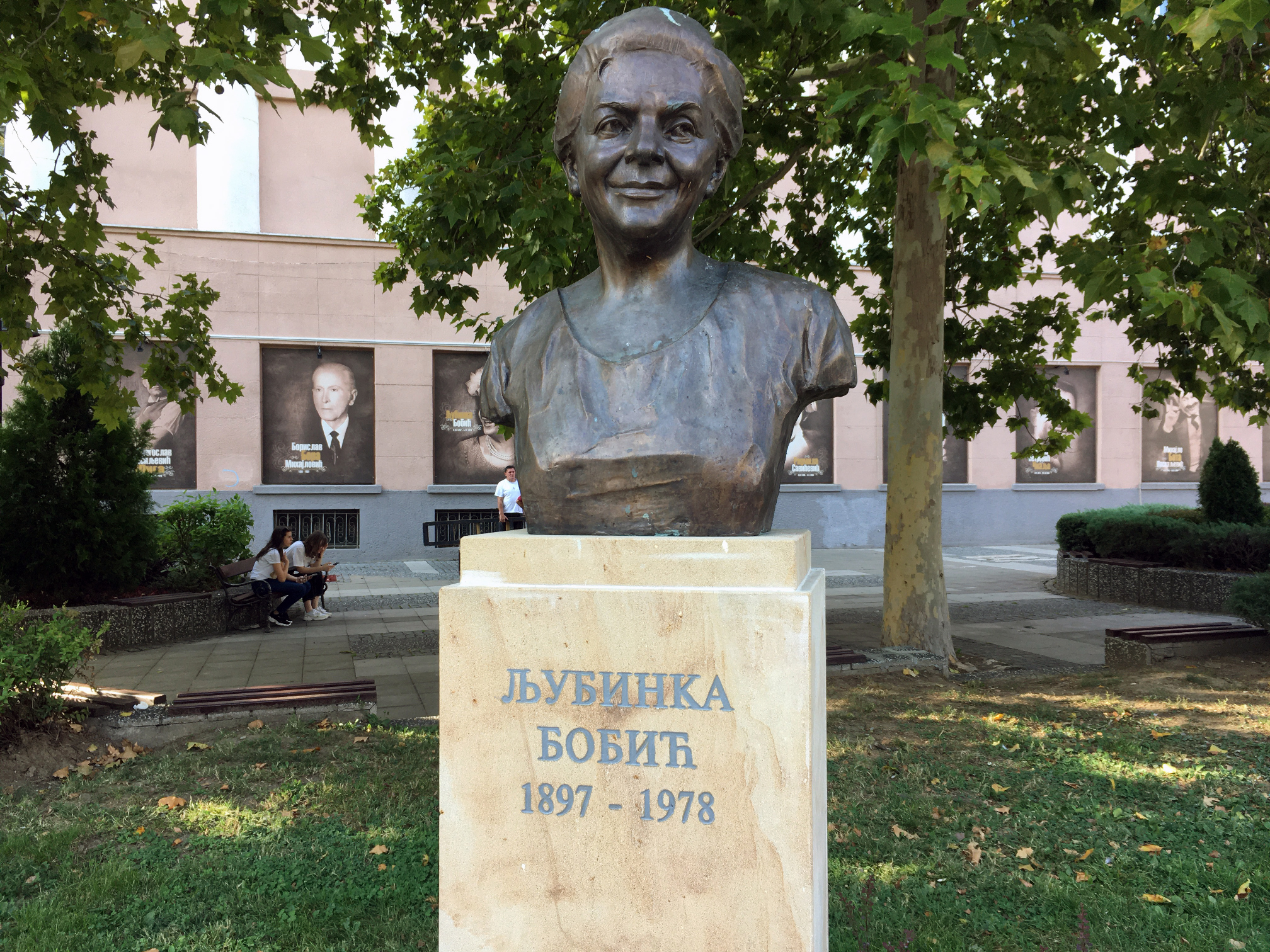
Bust of Bobić in Kruševac

- Golden arena in 1957. for the best female role in the movie "Priest Ćira and priest Spira"
- 7 July award of SR Serbia
- Golden turkey
- Award for life's work in 1961.

== Legacy ==
A street is named after her in New Belgrade, Bežanija, as well in Jakovo and Lazarice near Kruševac. Prominent theatre acting award, Ljubinka Bobić Award is given in her honour.

== Literature ==
- Stojković S.B. (1983). Great people in Serbian theatre. Belgrade: Serbian literary cooperatives – Valjevo: Milić Rakić
- Dimitrijević К. (2011). Three of the greatest Serbian actors behind the scene: Milivoje Živanović, Raša Plaović, Ljubinka Bobić. Belgrade: Prosveta.
- Dimitrijević К. (1994). Anti-biography Ljubinka Bobić. Theatron, 18, 85–107.
