= Feliks Pašić =

- Феликс Пашић
- Born: 19 February 1939; Split, Kingdom of Yugoslavia
- Died: 31 July 2010 (aged 71); Belgrade, Serbia
- Occupations: theatre and literary critic, publicist, journalist and translator
- Awards: Sterija Award for Best Theatre Review (1983, 1992); Sterija Award for Exceptional Contribution to the Advancement of Theater Arts and Culture (2006)

Feliks Pašić (Serbian Cyrillic: Феликс Пашић; 19 February 1939 – 31 July 2010) was a Serbian theatre and literary critic, publicist, journalist and translator. He won two Sterija Award for Best Theatre Review (1983, 1992) and Sterija Award for Exceptional Contribution to the Advancement of Theater Arts and Culture (2006).

== Work ==
=== Books ===
- Savremenici (1965)
- Oluja (1987)
- Kako smo čekali Godoa kad su cvetale tikve (1992)
- Karlo Bulić - avantura kao život (1992)
- Zoran (1995)
- Glumci govore I, II (2003)
- Mira Trailović, gospođa iz velikog sveta (2006)
- Joakimovi potomci (2006)

=== Monographs ===
- Grad teatar Budva - Prvih deset godina (1998)
- Deset festivala pozorišta za đecu (2002)
- Grad teatar Budva - Drugih deset godina (2007)
- Beogradsko dramsko pozorište - 60 godina (2007)
- Vuk, z. p. Tršić, Vukovi sabori 1933-2008 (2008)
- Zvezdara teatar 1984-2009 (2009)
