= Petar Kralj =

Serbian actor (1941–2011)

- Петар Краљ
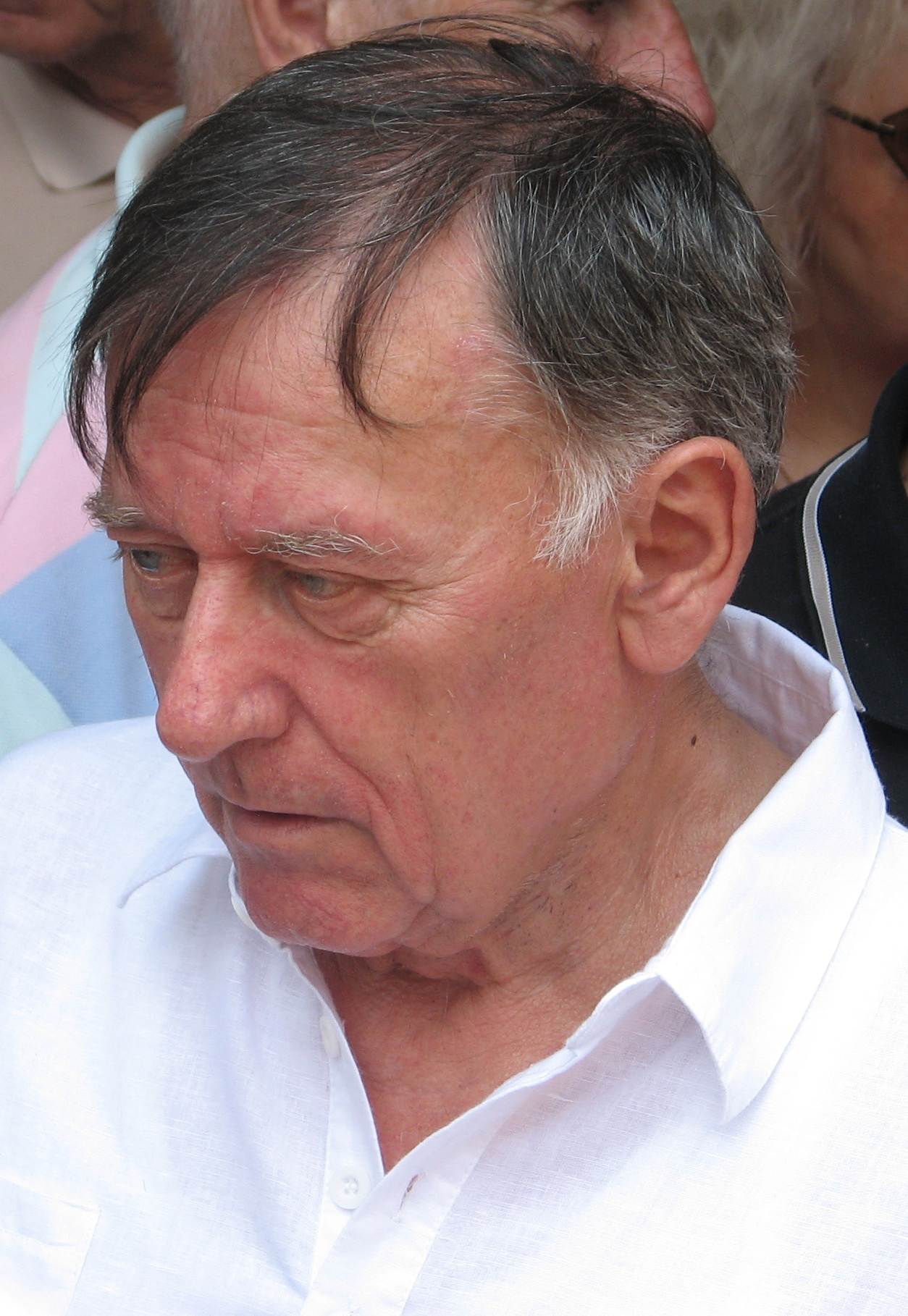
- Petar Kralj in 2010
- Born: 4 April 1941; Roviška near Glina, Croatia, Kingdom of Yugoslavia
- Died: 10 November 2011 (aged 70); Belgrade, Serbia
- Education: Faculty of Dramatic Arts
- Alma mater: University of Arts in Belgrade
- Occupation: Actor

Petar Kralj (Serbian Cyrillic: Петар Краљ; 4 April 1941 – 10 November 2011) was a Serbian theater, film and television actor.

== Biography ==
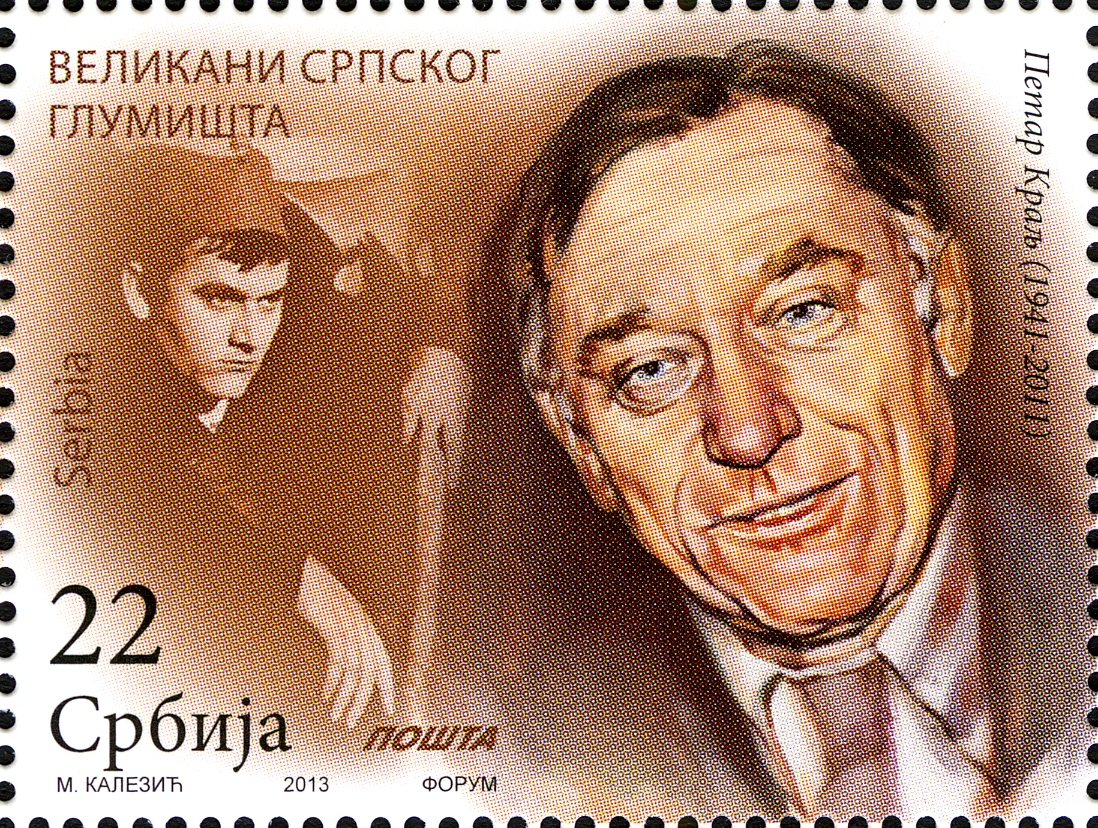
Petar Kralj on a 2013 Serbian stamp

Kralj was born in Roviška near Glina, Croatia to a Serb family from Banovina. During World War II his family fled to Syrmia, where he grew up. He graduated from a gymnasium in Novi Sad and studied acting at the University of Arts in Belgrade. He started his acting career at Atelje 212 theater. Kralj appeared on stage about 3,000 times, and starred in over 200 films, TV series and TV films, gaining huge popularity as one of the most recognizable Serbian actors. In December 2000, he was ranked eighth in the Serbian newspaper Večernje novosti in the "Best Serbian Actors and Actresses of the 20th Century" list. In 2005, he played the lead role in first Serbian science fiction television series The Collector.

He died in Belgrade, aged 70.
