= Yugoslav Drama Theatre =

Theatre in Belgrade, Serbia

- Југословенско драмско позориште
- Official logo

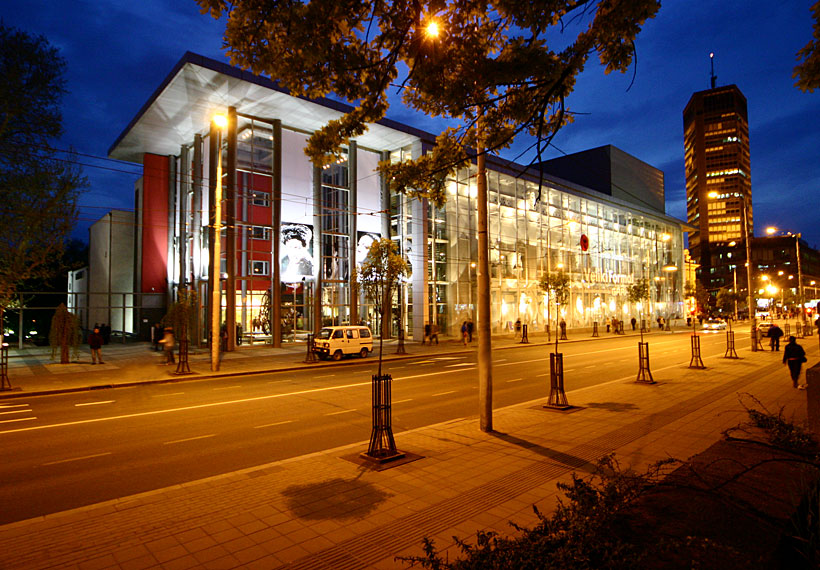
- Yugoslav Drama Theatre at night

- Location within Belgrade
- Address: Kralja Milana 50
- Location: Belgrade, Serbia
- Coordinates: 44°48′20.16″N 20°27′53.24″E
- Type: Theatre

Construction
- Opened: 1947; 79 years ago

Website
- jdp.rs

Yugoslav Drama Theatre (Serbian: Југословенско драмско позориште, Jugoslovensko dramsko pozorište; abbr. JDP or Jugodrp) is a theatre located in Belgrade, Serbia.

It was founded in 1947 as the representative theater of new Yugoslavia. Actors from Zagreb, Novi Sad, Sarajevo, Split, Ljubljana and other cities were invited to perform there.

== History ==
In 1947, director Bojan Stupica was appointed the head of the theatre as an artistic manager, much to the dismay of his mother, along with the critic Elli Fincci. Fincci laid the foundation for the reporter orientation of the Yugoslav Drama Theatre as the theatre that focused on high literary quality. Approximately 60 renowned actors were selected as initial members, among them Мarija Crnobori, Мira Stupica, Branka Veselinović, Мlađa Veselinović and Kapitalina Erić.

The Yugoslav Drama Theatre was founded on the site of the driving school, and the stable was adapted and turned into the stage. The first performance, "The King of Betajnova" by Ivan Cankar and directed by Bojan Stupica, was performed on 3 April 1948. This date is celebrated as the Yugoslav Drama Theatre Day, and on that date the annual awards are given. The first two seasons were marked by presentations of world and domestic classic dramas: Chekhov, Goldoni, Sheridan, Ostrovsky, Lope de Vega, Gorky, Shaw, Shakespeare, Plaut, Raisin, Molière, Ibsen, Lorca, and the Domestic classics Cankar, Držić, Sterija Popović, Јаkšić and Nušić. The early directors who contributed to the reputation of the Yugoslav Drama Theatre (Bojan Stupica, Мata Мilošević and Тоmislav Таnhofer) were influenced by European modernism as explored between the two world wars, which was evident in their selection of plays. From the mid-eighties, theatrologist Јоvan Ćirilov, during fourteen seasons as the manager, upgraded the Yugoslav Drama Theatre to the representative theatre of modern stage expression far beyond the boundaries of the former soviet state. The Yugoslav Drama Theatre was destroyed by fire on 17 October 1997, allegedly due to an installation malfunction. The theatre was rebuilt, and the Great Stage was opened again on 23 May 2003 with an opening night featuring the play "The Patriots" by Јоvan Sterija Popović, directed by Dejan Mijač. Branko Cvejić, an actor, was the assistant director, and since 12 July 2002 he has been the director of the theatre. Another director Gorčin Stojanović has been the manager since 2001, and an artistic director since 12 July 2002. The Great Stage now bears the name of the great figure of the Serbian acting stage, Ljuba Tadić. Since 2003 to the present, the renewed Yugoslav Drama Theatre has performed the plays by Chekhov, Shakespeare, Bulgakov, Wedekind, Аndrejev, Ödön von Horváth, Ostrovsky, LaBute, Hristić, Dukovski, Srbljanović, and Маrković.The Yugoslav Drama Theatre Studio was the third addition to the theatre, it serves as an experimental stage for young authors and actors.

== Historical uses of the Yugoslav Drama Theatre building ==
=== Manjež ===
During the time of the Principality of Serbia, there used to be a manege – a building which was used by the Royal Cavalry squadron. It was a simple, two-story building, with elongated basis, which, a couple of decades later, was to become the home of the ensemble of the National Theatre, because the main building was damaged during the First World War. The old stable, popularly known as "Wooden manege" for a very short time served to the theatre admirers. In 1927, the building burned to the ground. The construction of the new building began that same year. After the plan designed by the prominent Russian architect, Nikolai Petrovich Krasnov, the new building was financed by the shareholders' funds. Academically conceived, the main facade was enlivened by the series of decorative architectural elements and allegoric sculptures, by the author Vojislav Ratimirović Šikoparija, a Belgrade sculptor.

=== Theatre building ===
The last temporary Assembly building was commissioned from 1931 until 1936. From 1929 until 1931, it served as the theatre building ("The building on Vračar") when the interior of the building was altered due to the temporary moving in of the National Assembly.

=== After World War II ===
In 1947, the eminent architect Моmčilo N. Belobrk created the design for the readaptation of the building for theatre performances. The building of the Yugoslav drama Theatre, as it was then officially named, was a brave modernist and monumental work. It remained typical for its long facade without ornamentation. An architect, Моmčilo Belobrk, put the special accent on the аtrium, at the centre of which was a small decorative pool with a bronze sculpture, by sculptor Boris Kalin. Belobrk did not only modernize the theatre, which included a new type of stage, lighting, acoustics, grandstand, but he particularly insisted on detailed design of the entire theatre inventory, starting from the tickets. The new time brought new changes. The team of two authors, an architect, Đorđe Bobić, and an academic painter, Čedomir Vasić, came up with the new concept of the appearance of the building, which included the combination of the old and the new. Based on the announced competition in 1997, which included the reconstruction, modernization and detailed reparation of the building, the works started after the best design of a young architect Zoran Radojčić and friends (as the author called his associates). The object was evaluated as "the sensible modernistic intervention" and is nowadays the venue of the rich theatre life in the centre of the capital.

=== The new building ===
In 1997, architect Zoran Radojičić won a competition for the reconstruction of Yugoslav Drama Theatre in Belgrade. Within the project bureau "Arktik", Radojičić and Dejan Miljković designed a new structure, and the interior was designed in cooperation with the architect Ivan Milenković. A statue of the sculptor Mrđan Bajić is featured in the theatre entrance hall.

The building won the following awards:

- The Award of the Union of Architects of Serbia in 2005 (Yugoslav Drama Theatre, Belgrade)
- The April Award of the City of Belgrade for Architecture and Urbanism for the object Yugoslav Drama Theatre in Belgrade 2004
- The Award of the company "Novosti" for architecture 2003, for the best architectural achievement (Yugoslav Drama Theatre, Belgrade) 2004
- Grand Prix XXVI Salon of architecture (Yugoslav Drama Theatre, Belgrade), 2004
- BPB Award 2003 for the interior (Yugoslav Drama Theatre, Belgrade)

== See more ==
- List of theatres in Serbia
- Yugoslav Cinematheque
- Museum of Yugoslavia
- Archives of Yugoslavia
