= Faculty of Dramatic Arts, University of Arts in Belgrade =

Drama school in Belgrade, Serbia

University of Arts Faculty of Dramatic Arts
- Универзитет уметности у Београду; Факултет драмских уметности
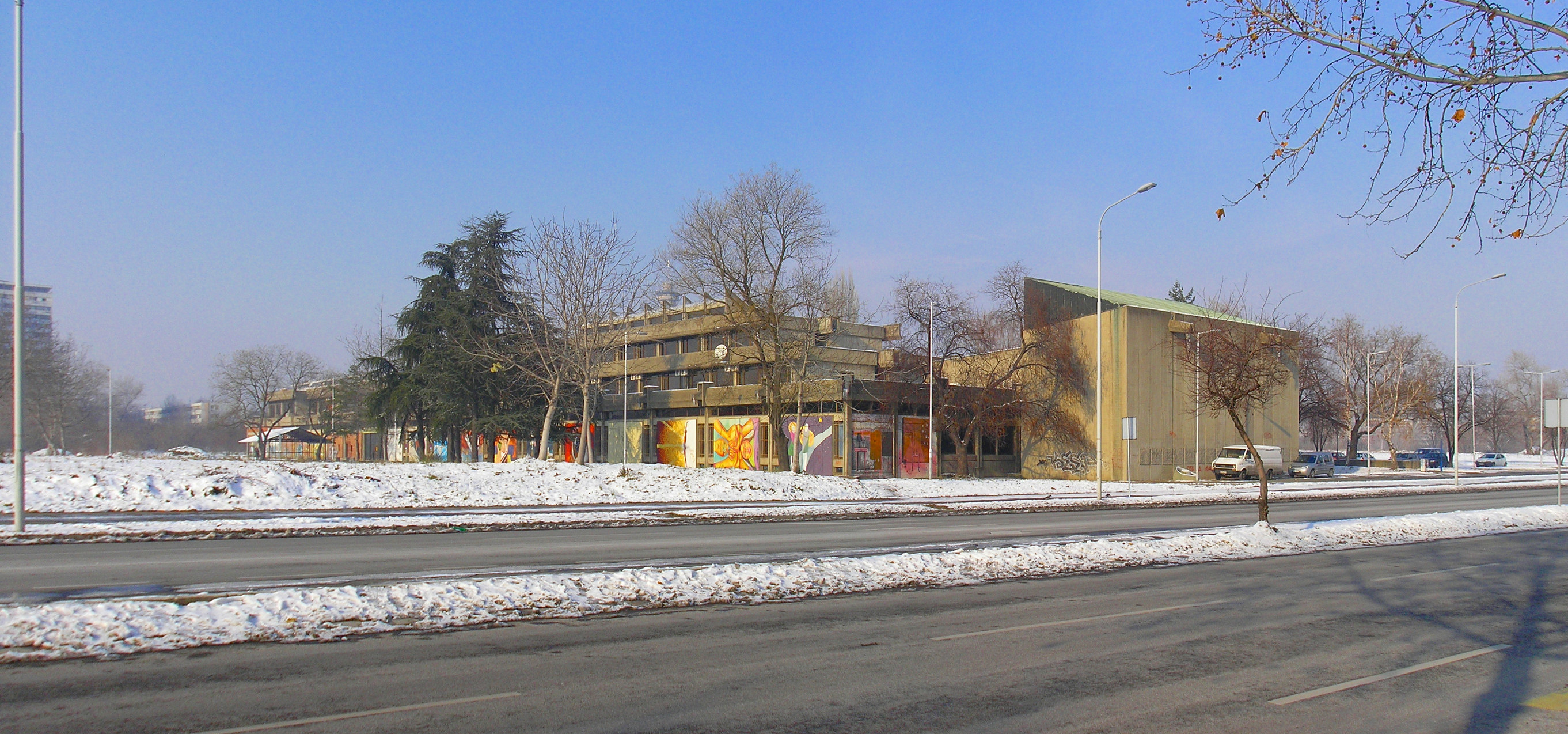
- Former names: Art Academy in Belgrade
- Type: Public
- Dean: Dragutin Ćirković
- Academic staff: 118 (2018–19)
- Students: 398 (2018–19)
- Undergraduates: 302 (2018–19)
- Postgraduates: 50 (2018–19)
- Doctoral students: 46 (2018–19)
- Location: Belgrade, Serbia; 44°48′52.7″N 20°24′32″E
- Website: fdu.bg.ac.rs

The Faculty of Dramatic Arts (Serbian: Факултет драмских уметности, romanized: Fakultet dramskih umetnosti; abbreviated FDU) is a constituent institution of the University of Arts in Belgrade which focuses on education and research in the fields of film, theatre, dramaturgy, culture, radio, acting and medias. It was established in 1948, as the first faculty of this type in Yugoslavia, and is the most esteemed institution of this kind, in the region.

The building, built in the brutalist style, is located in the urban neighborhood of Novi Beograd.

== History ==
The Faculty of Dramatic Arts was established in 1948 as the Academy of Theatre Arts. In 1950, the High Education School for Film Acting and Directing was merged into it, and in 1962, its name was changed to the Academy of Theatre, Film, Radio and Television. In 1973, it became a faculty and acquired its current name.

== Departments ==
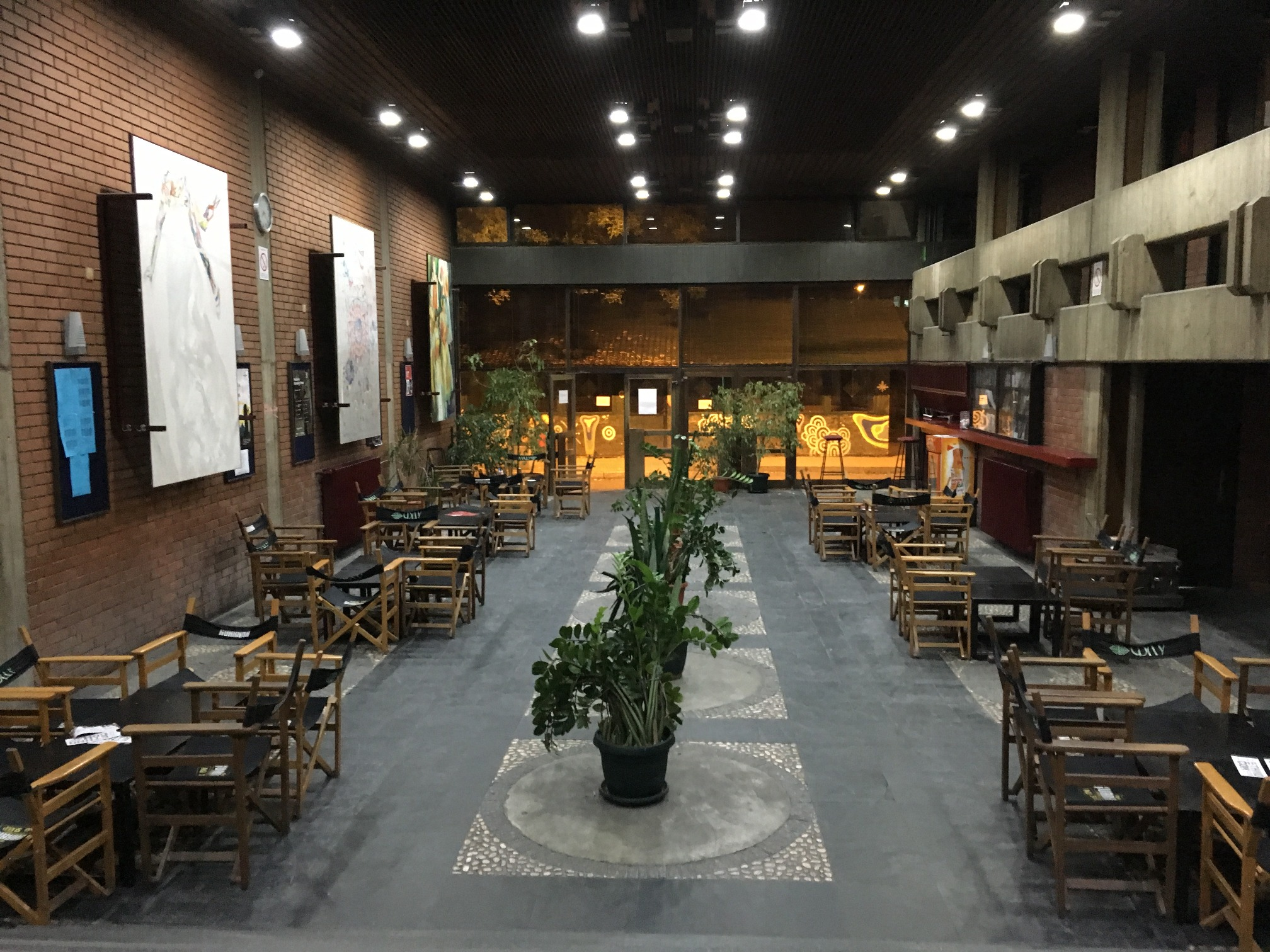
Interior of the faculty café, as of 2019

- Acting
- Dramaturgy/Screenwriting
- Camera
- Editing
- Film and Television Directing
- Film and Television Production
- Management and Production in Theatre, Radio and Culture
- Theatre and Radio Directing
- Sound Recording and Design
- Visual Effects, Animation and Game Art

== Notable teachers and alumni ==
- Stefan Arsenijević
- Miroslav Benka
- Slobodan Beštić
- Olga Bisera
- Isidora Bjelica
- Predrag Bjelac
- Dragoslav Bokan
- Dragan Ćirjanić
- Srđan Dragojević
- Bogdan Diklić
- Nikola Đuričko
- Bekim Fehmiu
- Nebojša Glogovac
- Srdan Golubović
- Branislava Ilić
- Zorica Jevremović
- Mirjana Joković
- Čedomir Jovanović
- Dragan Jovanović
- Olivera Katarina
- Dušan Kovačević
- Siniša Kovačević
- Ana Lasić
- Branislav Lečić
- Rade Marković
- Goran Marković
- Zinaid Memišević
- Radoslav Milenković
- Boris Miljković
- Đorđe Milosavljević
- Vjera Mujović
- Taško Načić
- Predrag Nikolić
- Nataša Ninković
- Nebojša Pajkić
- Vesna Perić
- Nikola Pejaković
- Stole Popov
- Miloš Radivojević
- Nadja Regin
- Lazar Ristovski
- Seka Sablić
- Uglješa Šajtinac
- Slobodan Selenić
- Biljana Srbljanović
- Boro Stjepanović
- Zoran Stefanović
- Slavko Štimac
- Danilo Stojković
- Milan Todorović
- Sergej Trifunović
- Mila Turajlić
- Milovan Vitezović
- Djordje Stojiljkovic
- Mustafa Presheva
- Milan Štrljić
- Velimir Živojinović
- Enver Petrovci
- Dragomir Bojanić
- Faruk Begoli
- Dragan Nikolić
- Predrag Laković
- Neda Arnerić
- Vesna Trivalić
- Olivera Marković

== Slobodan-Selenić-Award ==
This award (Serbian: "Slobodan Selenić" za najbolju diplomsku dramu na FDU) receives a student for the best graduation work each year, usually a dramatic text, named after the well-respected faculty teacher Slobodan Selenić.

- 1995 Biljana Srbljanović
- 1999 Uglješa Šajtinac

== See also ==
- Education in Serbia
- List of universities in Serbia
