= Lav Pajkić =

Serbian producer

- Лав Пајкић
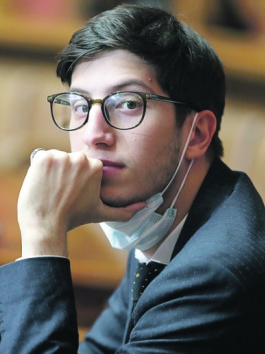
- Pajkić in the National Assembly

State Secretary in the Ministry of Labour, Employment, Veteran and Social Policy
- Incumbent
- Assumed office 16 December 2022
- Prime Minister: Ana Brnabić
- Minister: Nikola Selaković

Member of the National Assembly
- In office 3 August 2020 – 21 December 2022

Personal details
- Born: 25 October 1995 (age 30) Belgrade, Serbia, FR Yugoslavia
- Party: Serbian Progressive Party; Serbian People's Party (before)
- Parents: Nebojša Pajkić (father); Isidora Bjelica (mother)
- Education: Faculty of Dramatic Arts
- Profession: Producer, politician

Lav Grigorije Pajkić (Serbian Cyrillic: Лав Григорије Пајкић; born 25 October 1995) is a Serbian politician, film and television producer and television presenter. He is a member of the Serbian Progressive Party (SNS) and is currently serving as the state secretary in the ministry of labour, employment, veteran and social policy since 16 December 2022. Prior to this, he was a member of the National Assembly from 2020 to 2022.

== Early life and career ==
Pajkić was born on 25 October 1995 in Belgrade. His father, Nebojša Pajkić, is a screenwriter while his late mother, Isidora Bjelica, was a writer. His grandfather is a Serbian chess FIDE Master, Dimitrije Bjelica.

He is a student at the Faculty of Dramatic Arts.

At the age of 20, he was appointed director of the non-profit Serbian Scientific Television, and a year later he was admitted to the Trilateral Commission, making him the youngest member of that organization in Europe, if not in the world.

In 2017, Pajkić received his own late-night talk and news satire television program on the pro-government TV Pink called "Kontravizija" He has been criticised for promoting the Serbian Progressive Party and its president Aleksandar Vučić as well as for deceiving the public and faking surveys. Pajkić is a fierce critic of the opposition politicians, often insulting them and marking them as traitors. In one of his episodes, he compared another Serbian talk show host, Ivan Ivanović to human faeces.

== Political career ==
Pajkić was the president of the youth organization of the Serbian People's Party (SNP), led by Nenad Popović. He is currently a member of the Serbian Progressive Party and was given the 148th position on the Progressive Party's Aleksandar Vučić — For Our Children electoral list for the 2020 Serbian parliamentary election. The list won a landslide victory with 188 mandates out of 250, and Pajkić was sworn in as a member of the National Assembly on 3 August 2020. He was a member of the foreign affairs committee and the culture and information committee, a deputy member of the committee on constitutional and legislative issues, the leader of Serbia's parliamentary friendship group with Burundi, and a member of the parliamentary friendship groups with Egypt, Germany, Israel, Morocco, Turkey, and the United States of America.

He was reelected again In 2022 parliamentary elections but resigned in November 2022 as he was appointed as state secretary in the ministry of labour, employment, veteran and social policy, and could not hold both positions.

== Personal life ==
Pajkić is religious and is a member of the Serbian Orthodox Church. In 2017, he announced on Facebook that he had become a pilgrim with the blessing of Patriarch Theophilos III of Jerusalem.
