= Gabha Narerkathi massacre =

1971 massacre in Barisal, Bangladesh

- Part of 1971 Bangladesh genocide
- Native name: গাভা নরেরকাঠি / গাভা নরেরকাঠী গণহত্যা
- Location: 22.6091811°N 89.0987811°E; Gabha Narerkathi, Banaripara Upazila, Barisal District, Bangladesh
- Date: 2 May 1971 (GMT+6)
- Target: Bengali Hindus
- Weapons: Machine guns and bayonets
- Deaths: 95-100
- Perpetrators: Pakistani Army, Razakars

The Gabha Narerkathi massacre was a premediated massacre of Bengali Hindus in Gabha Narerkathi in Barisal, Bangladesh on 2 May 1971 by the Pakistani Army in collaboration with the Razakars during the Bangladesh Liberation War. According to sources, 95-100 Bengali Hindus were killed by the Pakistan Army and the Razakars.

== Events ==
The soldiers of the Pakistan Army, accompanied by the razakars of surrounding villages, came to Gabha Narerkathi on the morning of 2 May. They then ordered all the Hindus of the village to come out of their homes for a "peace committee" meeting. They were captured by the razakars and taken to the bank of a nearby canal, where they were shot and killed. Some of them who tried to escape by jumping into the water got drowned and carried away by the fast water stream.

== Aftermath ==
After the end of the war, the site of the massacre was marked by the local people, but till now neither a memorial has been constructed for the fallen, nor the victims' names have been tabulated.
