= Informbiro period =

Purges and reforms in Yugoslavia in response to the Tito–Stalin split

Yugoslavia was a federation of six republics. There were two provinces within Serbia.

The Informbiro period was an era of Yugoslavia's history following the Tito–Stalin split in mid-1948 that lasted until the country's partial rapprochement with the Soviet Union in 1955 with the signing of the Belgrade declaration. After World War II in Yugoslavia, Yugoslavia's new leadership under Josip Broz Tito pursued a foreign policy that did not align with the Eastern Bloc. Eventually, this led to public conflict, but the Yugoslav leadership decided not to acquiesce to Soviet demands, despite significant external and internal pressures. The period saw the persecution of the political opposition in Yugoslavia, resulting in thousands being imprisoned, exiled, or sent to forced labour. 100 Yugoslav citizens were seriously wounded or killed between 1948 and 1953 while some sources claim 400 victims during the existence of the Goli Otok prison camp. The purges included a significant number of members of Yugoslavia's security apparatus and its military.

This break with the Eastern Bloc caused significant economic difficulties for Yugoslavia as the country relied on trade with the USSR and Soviet allies. Economic pressures within the country led to reforms that would ultimately result in the introduction of socialist self-management and increased decentralisation of the country through constitutional amendments formalising the reforms.

The United States saw the rift between the Eastern Bloc and Yugoslavia as an opportunity during the Cold War to fragment the Eastern Bloc further and consequently provided economic and military aid, loans, and diplomatic support to the country. The new foreign policy circumstances led Tito to end Yugoslav support of Communist forces in the Greek Civil War and concluded the Balkan Pact, an agreement of cooperation and defence with Greece and Turkey.

The period had an impact on Yugoslavia's contemporary art and popular culture, as artists were encouraged to seek inspiration in the wartime struggle of the Yugoslav Partisans and the construction of new infrastructure. Decades later, many literary works and films covered the era's events.

The descriptor "Informbiro period" arose from the Communist Information Bureau (shortened to Informbiro in Serbo-Croatian rather than "Cominform" as in Russian or English), an organisation initiated by Stalin that had aimed to reduce divergence among communist governments.

== Background ==
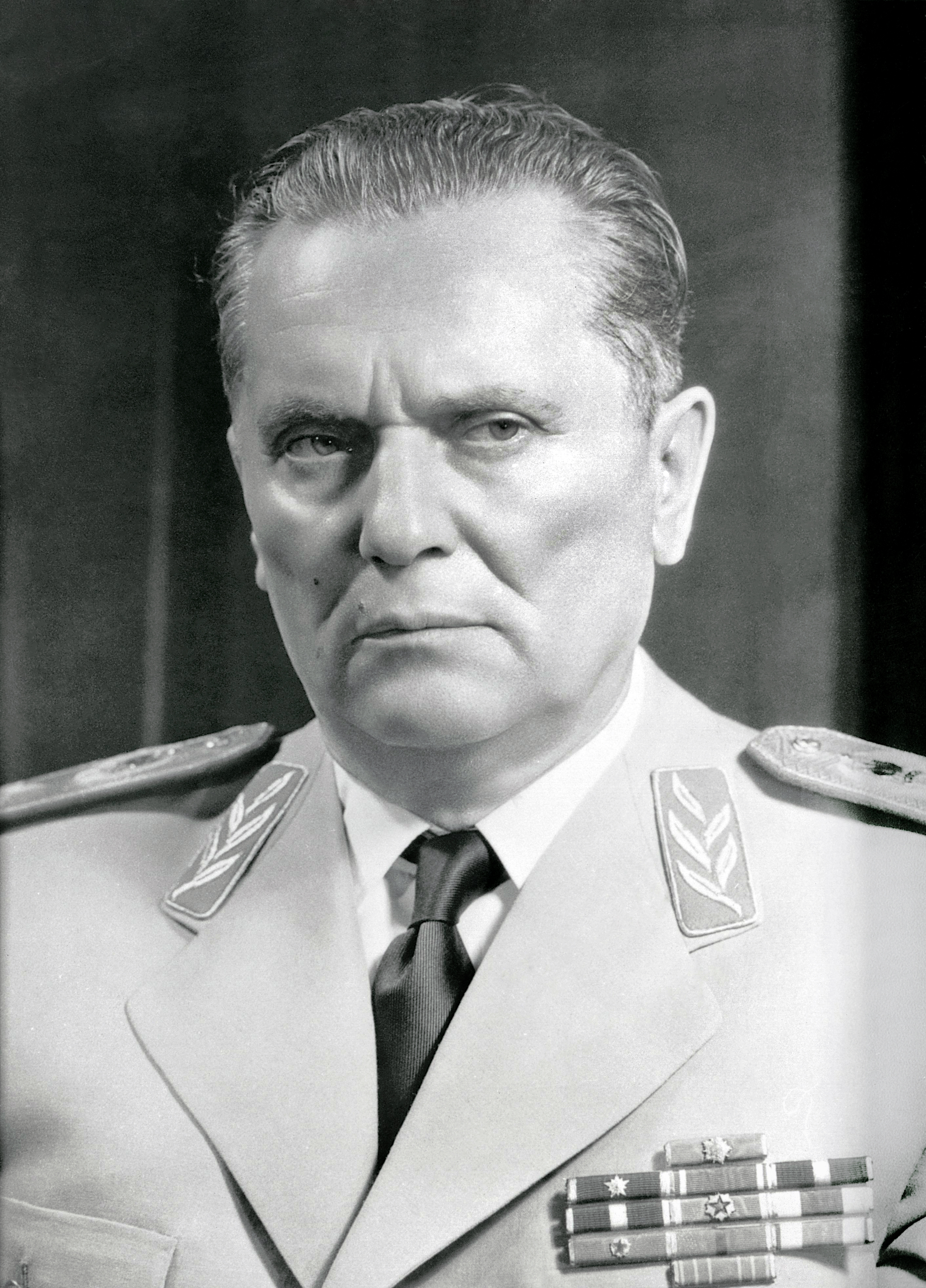
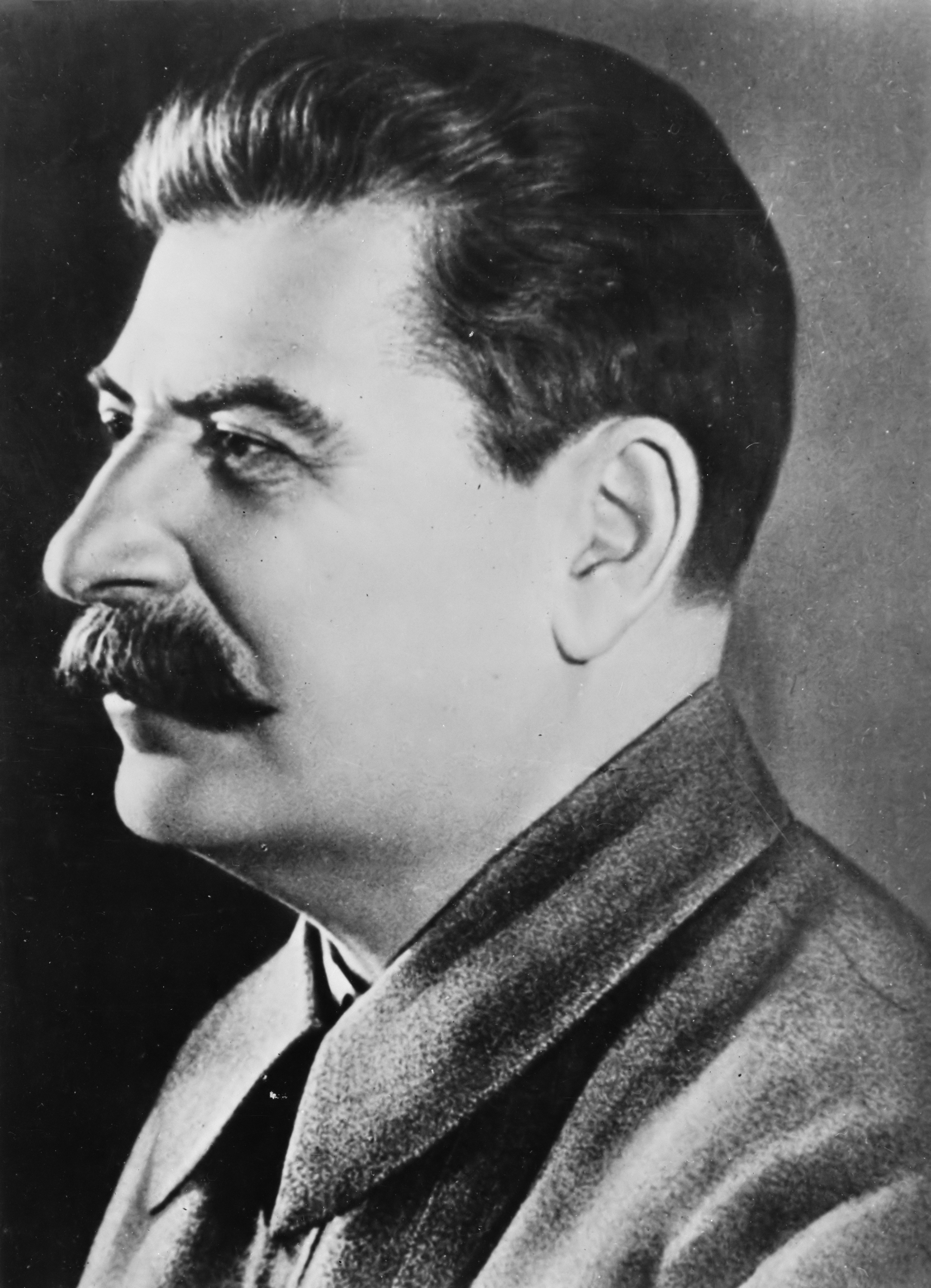
The Yugoslav–Soviet split became open through an exchange of three letters between Stalin and Tito in early 1948.

Relations between Joseph Stalin and Josip Broz Tito were often strained during World War II as the Soviet Union and the Yugoslav Partisans, a resistance movement established following Axis occupation of Yugoslavia, pursued divergent interests other than defeating the Axis powers and promoting Communist ideas. Nonetheless, Soviet advisers arrived in Yugoslavia in the autumn of 1944 and promised economic and military assistance—specifically arms and aid to the defence industry. By February 1947, little aid had arrived. In September 1947, when the Soviets formed the Information Bureau of the Communist and Workers' Parties, also known as the Cominform, they insisted on headquartering it in the Yugoslav capital of Belgrade, expanding their agents' access to Yugoslavia.

After the war, Stalin and Tito, and by extension the USSR and Yugoslavia, had increasingly divergent objectives and priorities in the areas of foreign relations, economic policies, and even in ideological approaches to the development of a Communist society. Despite these conflicting objectives, Stalin supported Yugoslav policy towards Albania, which treated it like a Yugoslav satellite state. The Soviet–Yugoslav relations took a significant turn to worse when Bulgaria and Yugoslavia signed a friendship and mutual assistance treaty in Bled in August 1947. The agreement, calling for greater integration between the two countries, was negotiated without consulting the USSR, leading Soviet Foreign Minister Vyacheslav Molotov to denounce it. The conflict gradually grew until 1948 when it culminated in the Tito–Stalin split—pitting Yugoslavia against the USSR, supported by the rest of the Eastern Bloc through the Cominform, in the period of conflict or at least tense relations with all pro-Western Yugoslav neighbours, the United Kingdom and the United States.

Following the military conquests of Trieste and a part of Carinthia in the final days of World War II, Tito pressed territorial claims against Austria—specifically Carinthia and Burgenland hoping for a corridor to Czechoslovakia—and against Italy in the Julian March area, including Trieste. The immediate vicinity of the city was organised as the Free Territory of Trieste under divided military administration by Yugoslavs and Western Allies, while the latter controlled the city itself. Following the Tito–Stalin split, the Soviets withdrew their support for Yugoslavs in further resolution of the Trieste dispute, and switched from backing Yugoslavia in favour of Austria. Since 1947, Yugoslavia provided increasing aid to the Democratic Army of Greece (Δημοκρατικός Στρατός Ελλάδας, Dimokratikós Stratós Elládas, DSE) in the Greek Civil War. Even after Stalin obtained assurances from Yugoslav leadership that the aid would cease, Tito informed Nikos Zachariadis of the Communist Party of Greece that the DSE could count on further help.

== Cominformist purges ==
=== Persecution of internal enemies ===
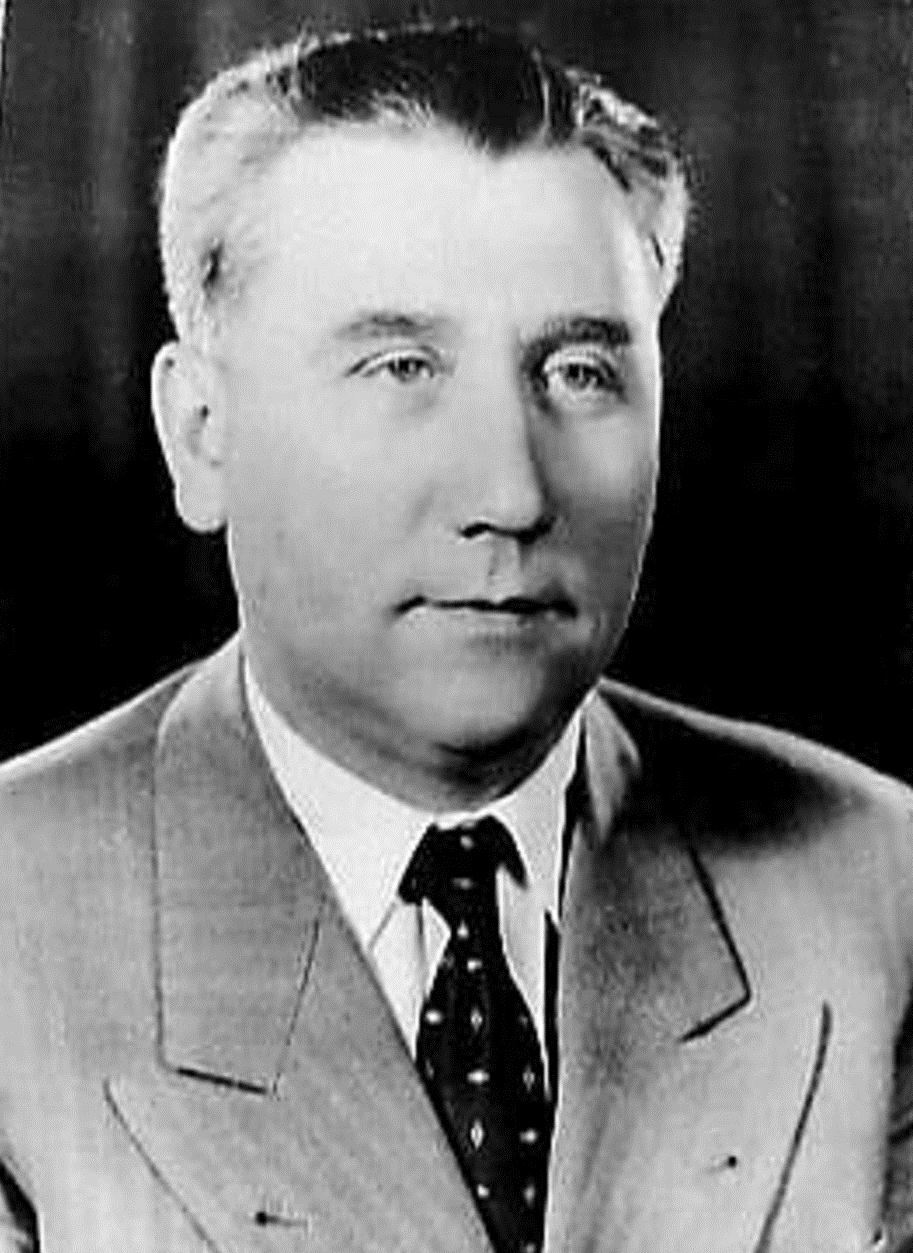
Aleksandar Ranković established a special anti-Cominform staff in the Yugoslav State Security Administration.

In the immediate aftermath of the Tito–Stalin split, the leadership of the ruling Communist Party of Yugoslavia (Komunistička partija Jugoslavije, KPJ) was faced with uncertainty over personal loyalty. Interior minister Aleksandar Ranković noted it was impossible to know whom to trust and that one's closest comrades may now be the enemy. Even as Tito and Stalin exchanged letters which led to their open split in early 1948, Tito called for action against central committee member Sreten Žujović and former minister of industry Andrija Hebrang. Žujović was the only person openly supporting Stalin when the central committee discussed Stalin's direct accusations and who was his source of information. Tito alleged Hebrang was the main source for Soviet mistrust and tasked Ranković with charging him. Ranković fabricated charges that Hebrang became an Ustaše spy during his captivity in 1942 and that the Soviets subsequently blackmailed him using that information as leverage. Both Žujović and Hebrang were apprehended within a week. There were numerous victims of persecution beyond Žujović and Hebrang. Real or perceived supporters of Stalin were termed "Cominformists" or "ibeovci" as a pejorative initialism based on the first two words in the official name of the Cominform. Thousands were imprisoned, killed, or exiled.

In response to the situation in the country, Ranković established a special anti-Cominform staff in the State Security Administration (Uprava državne bezbednosti, UDB) consisting of his deputy, and nominal head of the UDB, Svetislav Stefanović Ćeća, Veljko Mićunović, Jovo Kapičić, Vojislav Biljanović, Mile Milatović, and Jefto Šašić as the head of the Counterintelligence Service (Kontraobaveštajna služba, KOS).

In 1948–51 alone, 55,663 KPJ members were registered as Cominformists, or 19.52% of the 1948 party membership. However, in the same period, the membership was augmented by the introduction of more than half a million new members. The number and proportion of Cominformists in the KPJ membership varied substantially by federal constituent republics and regions, and as by ethnicity. More than half the members were registered in Serbia proper, while the highest proportion relative to the total population was found in Montenegro.

Such high numbers of Cominformists in Serbia in absolute terms, and in Montenegro in relative terms compared to its population, are explained by the Russophilia traditionally observed there. The origins of this sentiment are linked to Imperial Russian aid in 1804–1815 during the Serbian Revolution coinciding with the 1806–1812 Russo-Turkish War, and subsequently, diplomatically as the Principality of Serbia gained diplomatic recognition in 1830. The sentiment was reinforced in Montenegro since the Russian Empire acted, or was perceived to have acted, to protect the Principality of Montenegro against the Ottoman Empire in the mid-18th century. By extension, this support was given to the USSR.

The exact number of those arrested remains uncertain, but in 1983, Radovan Radonjić stated that 16,288 were arrested and convicted, including 2,616 belonging to various levels of the KPJ leadership. According to Ranković, 51,000 people were killed, imprisoned or sent to forced labour. A majority of them were sentenced without a trial. Prisoners were held at numerous sites including actual prisons, as well as prison camps in Stara Gradiška and the repurposed Ustaše concentration camp in Jasenovac. A special-purpose prison camp was built for Cominformists on the uninhabited Adriatic islands of Goli Otok and Sveti Grgur in 1949.

=== Purge of the military and security apparatus ===
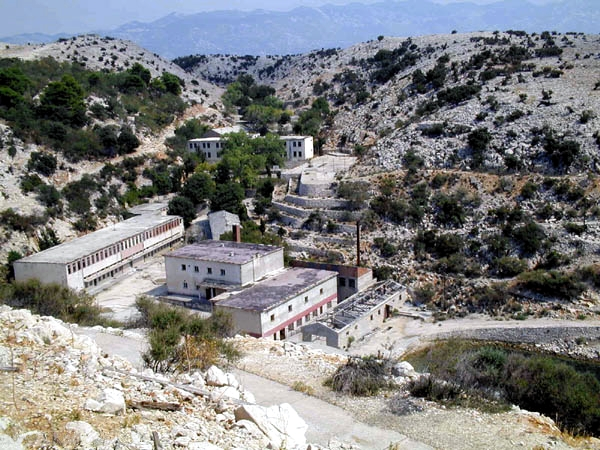
Goli Otok prison camp was built to hold people convicted of supporting Stalin after the split from the USSR.

The secret police themselves were among organisations targeted by purges. Yugoslav sources indicate that 1,722 UDB servicemen and officers were convicted. Particularly wide-ranging purges were carried out against the UDB in Sarajevo after all of the UDB personnel of Sarajevo's second district declared their support for the Cominform. Their action was echoed by UDB chiefs in Mostar and Banja Luka. At least seventeen UDB officers holding the rank of Lieutenant Colonel or higher in high-profile positions in the federal bodies or in Serbia, Bosnia and Herzegovina, and Montenegro were arrested, and several UDB officers escaped to Romania.

Support for the Soviets within the Yugoslav Army ranks is difficult to determine. Low-end estimates indicate that 10–15% of the army's personnel favoured the Soviet position. Yugoslav sources estimate the number of military members arrested is in a range from 4,153 officers and soldiers put forward by Radonjić, to 7,000 imprisoned officers estimated by Milovan Đilas. The purge included 22 officers in the presidential guard regiment reporting directly to Tito, including Momčilo Đurić, wartime commander of the Yugoslav Partisan Supreme Headquarters escort battalion.

Forty-nine Yugoslav Army graduates of the Voroshilov, the Frunze, and other Soviet military academies were deemed potential Soviet supporters. Many of those attending such academies in the USSR at the time of the Tito–Stalin split never returned to Yugoslavia.

The split particularly affected the Air Force. Almost all Air Force officers had Soviet training, and some of them fled the country in air force planes. The defectors included Major General Pero Popivoda, who was the head of the air force operational service. Batajnica, Zemun, and Pančevo airbases near Belgrade saw several attacks by groups of saboteurs, while the Zemun airbase commander and his deputy fled to Romania.

== Opposition and resistance ==
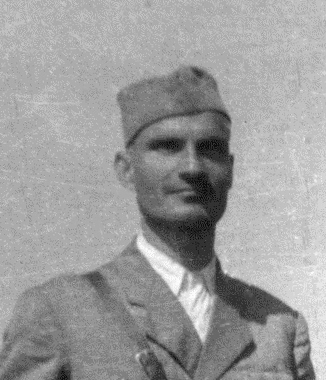
Arso Jovanović headed an unsuccessful coup d'état and was subsequently killed while fleeing to Romania.

=== Attempted coup ===
In the immediate aftermath of the split, there was at least one failed attempt of a military coup d'état supported by the Soviets. Colonel General Arso Jovanović, who was chief of Tito's wartime Supreme Headquarters and later the chief of the General Staff of the Yugoslav Army headed it, supported by Major General Branko Petričević Kadja and Colonel Vladimir Dapčević. Border guards killed Jovanović near Vršac while he was attempting to flee to Romania, Petričević was arrested in Belgrade, and Dapčević was arrested just as he was about to cross the Hungarian border.

=== Émigrés and infiltrators ===
Tito faced opposition from a group of émigrés—Yugoslav nationals who were out of the country at the time of the split. According to Yugoslav sources, the group consisted of 4,928 people including 475 specifically chosen military and civilian experts sent to the USSR and elsewhere in the Eastern Bloc for training, and comparably few defectors. Initially, the Yugoslav ambassador to Romania, Radonja Golubović, led them. In addition to Golubović, the group included diplomats posted to Hungary, Sweden, Norway, and the United States. By late 1949, Popivoda was established as the undisputed leader of the exiled opposition, and the group named itself the League of Yugoslav Patriots for the Liberation of the Peoples of Yugoslavia from the Yoke of the Tito-Ranković Clique and Imperialist Slavery.

Soviet authorities organised the émigrés along several lines. They supported the publication of several newspapers advocating anti-Titoist efforts, the most influential being Za socijalističku Jugoslaviju (For Socialist Yugoslavia) and Nova borba (New Struggle). Radio Free Yugoslavia aired daily propaganda broadcasts from Bucharest. Various non-military experts were trained for a future takeover of the government, while military personnel were organised into four international brigades deployed to Hungary, Romania and Bulgaria near their Yugoslav borders, and an air force unit was set up in the Ural Mountains. The international brigades included thousands of personnel drawn from various Eastern Bloc countries touted as volunteers.

The Soviet allies blockaded their borders with Yugoslavia—where 7,877 border incidents took place. By 1953, Soviet or Soviet-backed incursions resulted in the killing of 27 Yugoslav security personnel. More than 700 agents are thought to have crossed the border into Yugoslavia—160 of whom were captured and 40 killed in combat.

=== Insurrections ===
The Yugoslav security apparatus also faced armed insurrection in several areas—most notably in Montenegro. As a result, an entire UDB division was deployed to Montenegro in the summer and autumn of 1948 to combat the insurrection led by former secretary of the KPJ organisation Ilija Bulatović, in the town of Bijelo Polje. In addition to the KPJ organisation there, large segments or entire organisations in Kolašin, Berane, Cetinje, Nikšić, Bar, and Danilovgrad voiced support for the Cominformists. A special task force, headed by Komnen Cerović, was added to the Montenegrin government to persecute the insurgents. They suppressed the rebellion but only temporarily. In 1949, Cerović's force took out insurgent strongholds in the Monetenegrin part of Sandžak. Further uprisings took place in the Zeta River valley and the area between the republic's capital, Titograd and Nikšić. Ultimately, the insurgents failed.

Two more insurrections, led by ethnic Serb veterans of the Partisan forces and former army officers, took place in the areas of Kordun, Lika, Banovina in Croatia, and just across the federal unit's border in Bosnia and Herzegovina where rebellion centered on the city of Cazin in 1950. In the Cazin area, the bulk of the insurgents were actually Muslim peasants. The motivation for the twin rebellions appears more diverse, including real or perceived inadequate appreciation of the wartime efforts of the rebellion leaders, promises to abolish various taxes, and the restoration of King Petar II to the throne. Yugoslav authorities captured ten infiltrators, including eight former Chetniks, coming from Austria to support the rebels. The insurrections were put down quickly, and Yugoslav authorities ascribed them to Cominformism. Also, a likewise unsuccessful, small-scale rebellion took place in Slovenia at the same time.

=== Albania's Resistance during the Informbiro Era ===
Throughout the Informbiro period, spanning from 1948 to 1954, Albania and Yugoslavia were embroiled in a series of armed confrontations fueled by territorial disputes and ideological differences between their leaders, Josip Broz Tito and Enver Hoxha. This era witnessed heightened tensions along the Albanian-Yugoslav border, making it a focal point of contention within the Eastern Bloc during the Cold War. Additionally, Enver Hoxha also ordered the expulsion of all Yugoslav politicians and military personnel from across Albania.

== Impact on Yugoslav policies ==
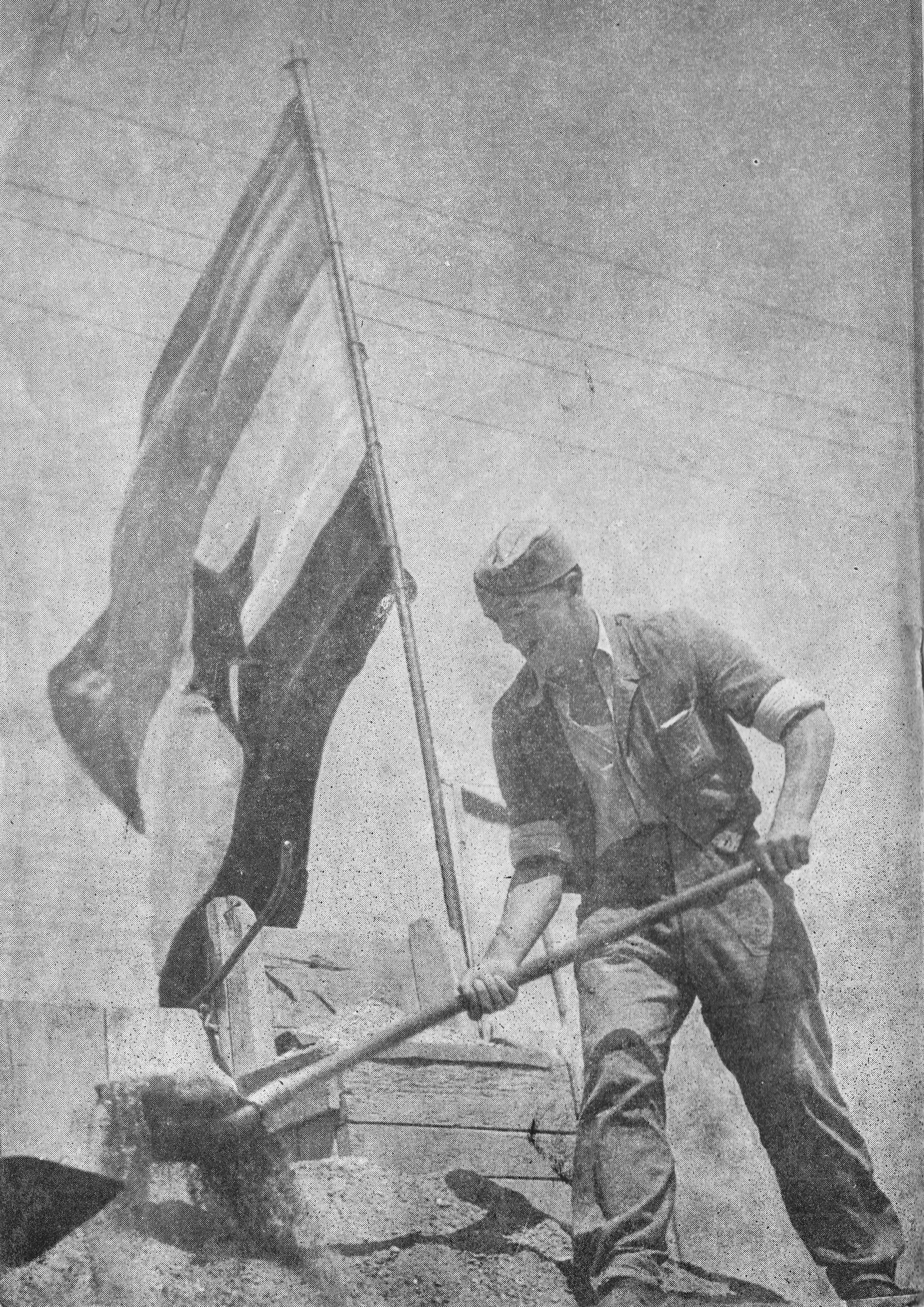
Yugoslavia saw large-scale labour-intensive infrastructure works, such as construction of New Belgrade where this photo was taken.

=== Economic development until mid-1948 ===
Prior to 1948, the Yugoslav economy relied on state-controlled trade of agricultural products and raw materials to the USSR in exchange for processed goods and machinery. Overall shortages of machinery and local shortages of labour—especially skilled experts—plagued the economy. As the conflict with Stalin progressed, Yugoslavia decided to become self-sufficient and develop its military capabilities, which led to greater budget expenditures for infrastructure and personnel, and the establishment of research and development institutions. To offset the lack of machinery, third shifts were introduced in factories. Authorities mobilised, under threat of imprisonment, those not otherwise employed, and peasants not actively doing agricultural work, to work in mines extracting coal or ores for export, or at construction sites. Food and fuel were stockpiled for the military, leading to market shortages.

=== Turning to the United States for aid ===
By June 1948, Yugoslavia reached an agreement with the United States, allowing Yugoslav authorities to access their gold reserves held in the United States. At the same time, Yugoslavia announced it would like to trade with the West. Yugoslavia first requested assistance from the United States in summer 1948. In December, Tito announced strategic raw materials would be shipped to the West in return for increased trade.

In February 1949, the US decided to provide Tito with economic assistance and, in return, the US would demand Tito to cut support to the DSE when the internal situation in Yugoslavia allowed such a move without endangering his position. Ultimately, Secretary of State Dean Acheson took the position that the Yugoslav five-year plan must succeed if Tito was to prevail against Stalin and that, regardless of the nature of his regime, Tito was in the United States' interest. In October 1949, Yugoslavia received backing by the United States and won its bid for a seat on the United Nations Security Council, despite Soviet opposition.

=== Economy following the rift with the USSR ===
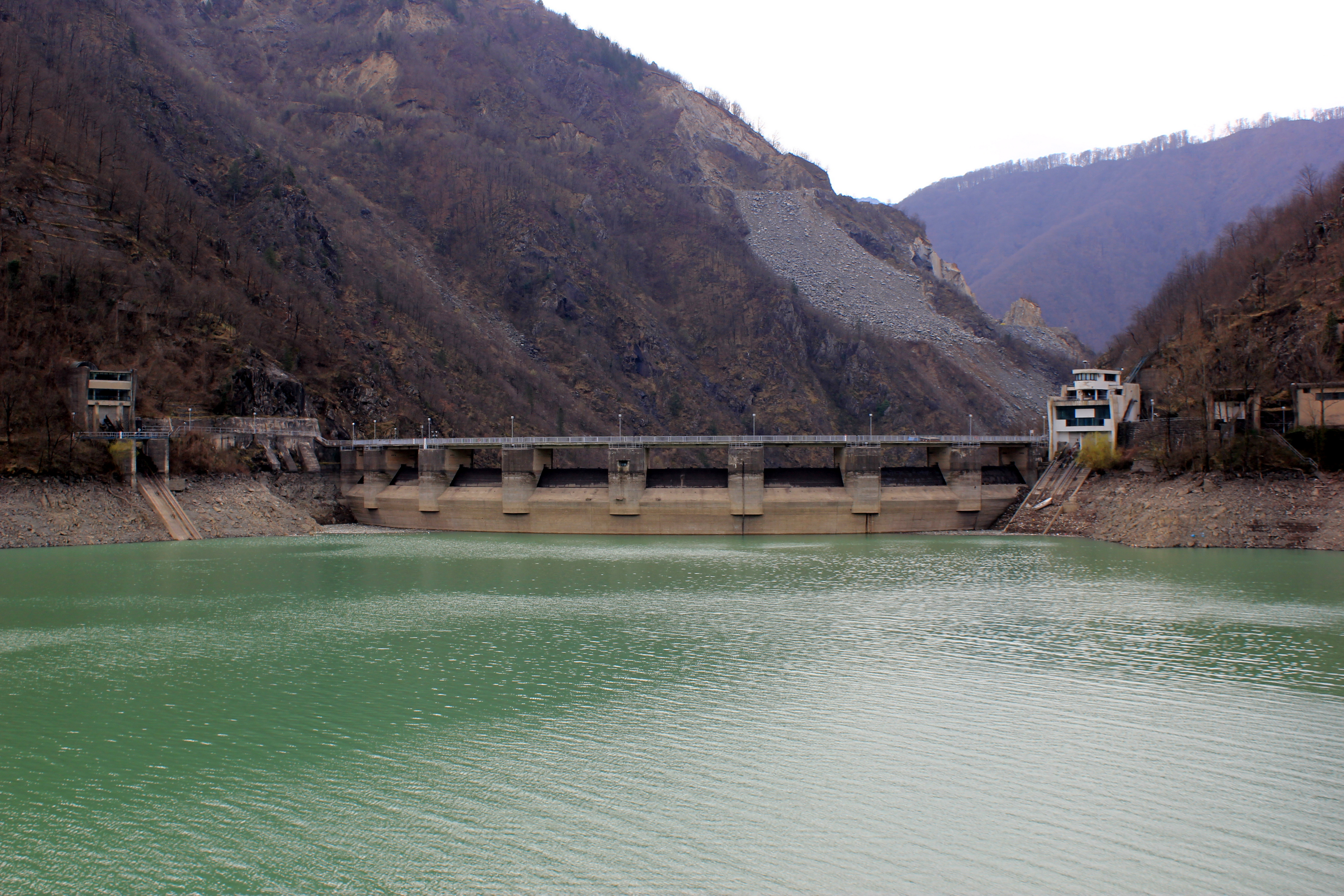
Construction of the Jablanica Dam took place during the period following the Tito–Stalin split as one of major infrastructural works in Yugoslavia.

The Soviet-led blockade of Eastern Bloc trade with Yugoslavia came into effect gradually and remained incomplete until 1949. It first took the form of stoppage of oil from Albania, Hungary and Romania, but purchases from Allied authorities in the Free Territory of Trieste offset this. Trading with the United States began in 1948 when Yugoslavia purchased a steel blooming mill, fifteen oil drills, industrial mixers required to set up a tire production facility, five mobile repair workshops and several thousand tractor tires in exchange for various minerals and ores. By the end of the year, it concluded trade agreements with several West European countries.

The Export–Import Bank of the United States (Ex-Im Bank) approved its first loan in late August 1949, when the Soviet blockade took full effect. It reflected the decision to "keep Tito afloat" made in February. The United States switched to full support by September. Soon, the International Monetary Fund and the World Bank approved loans as well, albeit requiring Yugoslavia to use them to repay pre-war debts to Britain, France, Italy and Belgium. The United States pressured Belgium to accept payment in kind instead of cash.

By the end of the year, stocks of grain, fertilisers, and agricultural machinery were running very low. At the same time, export income declined by 36% requiring the extension of rationing. Consequently, a $20 million Ex-Im Bank loan was used to buy food in October 1950, and the United States sent nearly twice the amount of food as aid in November. In late December, President Harry S. Truman signed the 1950 Yugoslav Emergency Assistance Act granting $50 million worth of food. This aid helped Yugoslavia overcome poor harvests of 1948, 1949 and 1950, but there would be almost no economic growth before 1952.

In 1950, Yugoslav authorities sought to combat unsustainable labour practices and improve production efficiency through the introduction of compulsory employment contracts and the reduction of labour quotas while maintaining production goals, and requiring factories to balance goods, available cash, and labour through workers' councils. The system would later become known as "self-management". The push to increased efficiency led to lay-offs of workers deemed less productive—including women, the elderly and even maintenance crews, which did not actually produce anything—resulting in a sharp rise in unemployment.

== Decentralisation and constitutional reform ==
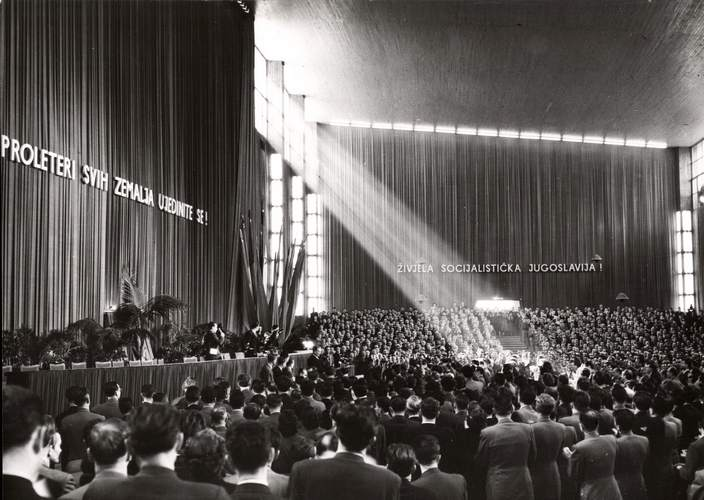
The Communist Party of Yugoslavia renamed itself the League of Communists of Yugoslavia at its sixth congress held in Zagreb in 1952.

Even though Soviet and Cominform propaganda drew attention to inequalities in the economic development of various parts of Yugoslavia alleging restoration of capitalism, and national oppression of the underdeveloped nations, the clash between strict centralisation and decentralisation appeared as a conflict between the political principle and economic priorities. There was a proposal led by Ranković in 1949 to introduce oblasts as an intermediate-level administrative bodies designed to reduce power of federal republics, but it was dismissed by the KPJ central committee following Slovene objections. In 1952, Deputy Prime Minister Edvard Kardelj drafted constitutional amendments to reflect the reality of the economic reforms of 1950–51 leading to a debate which would extend for more than a year. The 1953 Yugoslav constitutional amendments established an additional legislative chamber composed of representatives of socially-owned economic operators who debated and voted on all economic matters—including the budget. Furthermore, it sought to reflect the economic power of each constituent republic, giving a majority to Slovenia and Croatia if strictly applied, while ensuring equal representation of each federal unit in the assembly to counterbalance this.

Ultimately, the KPJ accepted decentralisation and rebranded itself as the League of Communists of Yugoslavia (Savez komunista Jugoslavije, SKJ) at its sixth congress held in Zagreb in 1952 to reflect the prevailing spirit. The constitutional amendments, adopted on 13 January 1953, were only the second step in a series of five constitutional reforms reflecting the social development of Communist-ruled Yugoslavia, but the principles introduced in 1953 were retained all the way to socialist Yugoslavia's final constitution adopted in 1974.

== Foreign relations and defence cooperation ==
=== Perception of Soviet threat and military aid ===
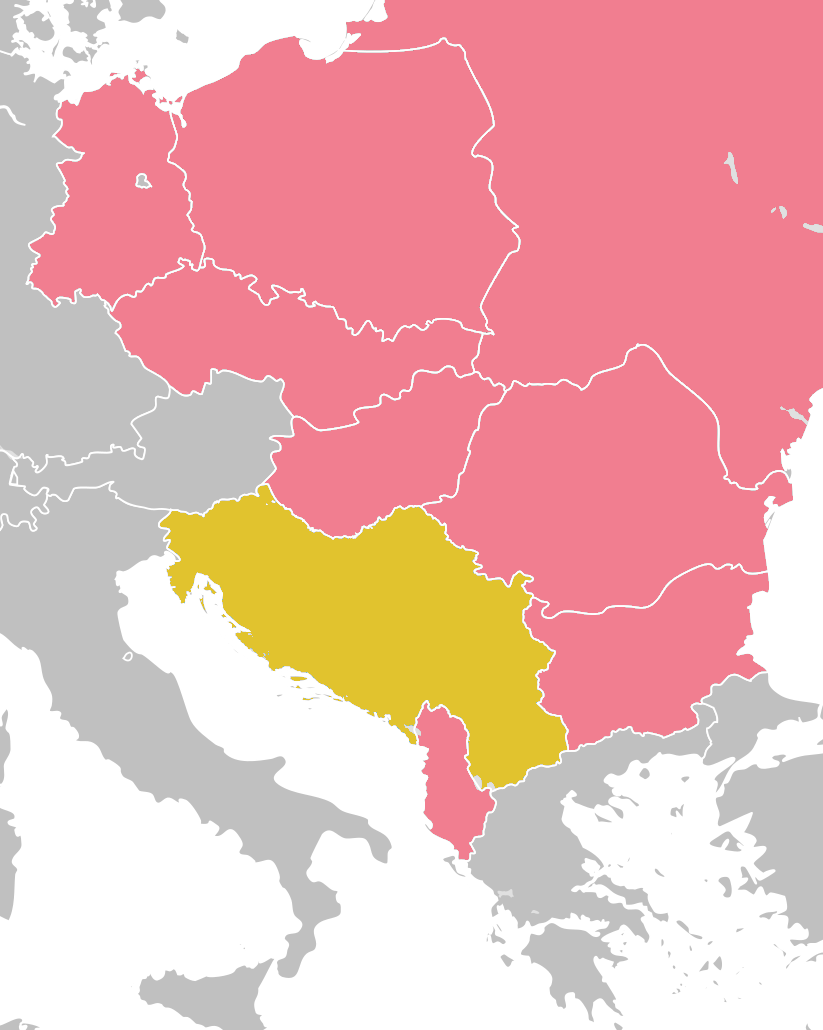
The Eastern Bloc countries (marked ★) at the time of the Tito–Stalin split; The Free Territory of Trieste is not shown

Even though the Yugoslavs initially avoided asking for military aid, believing it would be a pretext for a Soviet invasion, it is unclear whether the USSR planned any military intervention in response to the Tito–Stalin split. Hungarian Major General Béla Király, who defected to the United States in 1956, claimed that there were such plans, but research carried out in the 2000s demonstrated his claims were false. Regardless of any Soviet plans, Yugoslavs believed an invasion was likely and planned accordingly. It would appear from a message from Stalin to Czechoslovak president Klement Gottwald in 1948 that his aim was the isolation and decline of Yugoslavia.

Following a shift of United States policy to "all-out support" for Yugoslavia, on 17 November 1949, the National Security Council pledged to help Yugoslavia defend against invasions. By 1951, Yugoslav authorities became convinced that a Soviet attack was inevitable and Yugoslavia joined the Mutual Defense Assistance Program (MDAP). Shortly before Yugoslavia joined the MDAP, the Yugoslav military held an exercise near Banja Luka in 1951 which hosted US observers, including the Chief of Staff of the United States Army General J. Lawton Collins. In November, the United States provided aid under the MDAP and successfully persuaded the British and French to sell arms to Yugoslavia. The United States provided a large quantity of military hardware; the bulk of the equipment was given to the Army. The Yugoslav Air Force was particularly low on equipment in 1951, but within two years it received 25 Lockheed T-33As, and 167 Republic F-84 Thunderjets. In view of the defence cooperation, the United States Forces in Austria proposed a plan for joint American-Yugoslav defence against Soviet advances from Hungary to Austria through Slovenia, but such plans were never approved. By the mid-1950s, the military aid provided by the United States amounted to a half a billion dollars.

=== Alliance with Greece and Turkey ===
In 1952, as Greece and Turkey joined the North Atlantic Treaty Organization (NATO), the US ambassador approached the Yugoslav ambassador to Turkey in Ankara and suggested strengthening military ties between Yugoslavia with Greece and Turkey. The idea was discussed through 1952 at various levels, with all three countries expressing interest in cooperation, although Yugoslavia employed the most cautious approach to an alliance.

In February 1953, Yugoslav, Greek and Turkish foreign ministers signed the Treaty of Friendship and Cooperation in Ankara, later also known as the Ankara Agreement, formalising an agreement to cooperate in defence matters. A military alliance agreement building on the Ankara Agreement was signed by the three in Bled on in August 1954, but it did not attach Yugoslavia to NATO. Instead, it allowed Yugoslavia to retain an independent policy. Tito signed this pact to bolster the defense of Yugoslavia against a potential Soviet military invasion. It also made the option of Yugoslavia's NATO membership more plausible at its time. Under this pact, any potential Soviet invasion of Yugoslavia could also lead to NATO intervention to help defend Yugoslavia due to the NATO memberships of Greece and Turkey. However, the foreign policy disagreements between the three countries in the pact eventually crippled the alliance itself, thus ending the possibility of Yugoslavia's NATO membership.

== Rapprochement with the USSR ==
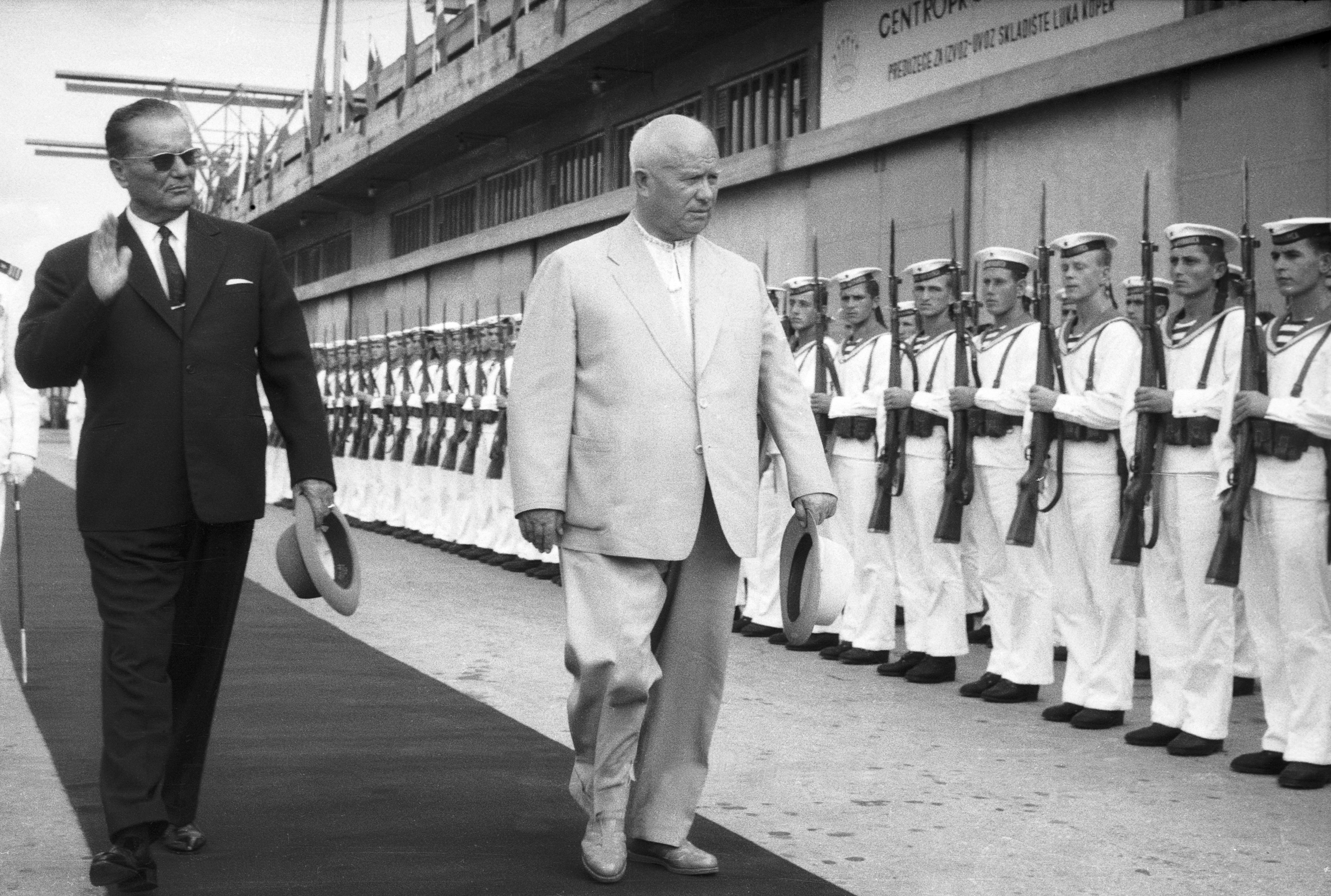
Khruschev and Tito met in 1955, mending the Yugoslav–Soviet relations after seven years (shown here in 1963)

Stalin's death in March 1953 resulted in a reduction of Soviet pressure against Yugoslavia. In turn, within months, Tito moved to halt further SKJ reforms advocated most vocally at that point by Milovan Đilas. His expulsion from the SKJ in early 1954 was seen as a favourable development by the new Soviet leadership. As a sign of normalisation of mutual relations, the USSR and Yugoslavia exchanged ambassadors and re-established economic relations by the end of 1953.

On 1 July 1954, as signing of the Bled agreement was imminent, a Soviet ambassador delivered Nikita Khrushchev's message to Tito indicating an urgent desire to restore relations between the USSR and Yugoslavia. Khruschev and Nikolai Bulganin visited Yugoslavia where they expressed regret over the disruption of the Soviet-Yugoslav relations and promised to rebuild them on new foundations. They signed the Belgrade Declaration recognising Yugoslav socialism as a legitimate variant of the political system, and the Cominform was dissolved in 1956. The United States saw the visit as a setback to their defence cooperation with Yugoslavia, but noted it was the Soviets who backed down and appeared to have accepted Tito's terms of cooperation. In that light, they continued to view Yugoslavia as a Cold War asset of value to US policy. Still, US aid was reduced as Yugoslav cooperation with the Eastern Bloc increased.

In light of the new situation on the ground, the United States Congress sought to eliminate aid to Yugoslavia altogether to cut costs, but President Dwight Eisenhower opposed the idea fearing Yugoslavia might be unable or unwilling to maintain independence and forced to turn completely to the USSR. US Secretary of State John Foster Dulles met with Tito at the Brijuni Islands in November 1955 and was able to confirm to Eisenhower that Yugoslavia would keep its distance from the Eastern Bloc. Yugoslavia's independence was further supported through aid, thus denying the USSR a strategic position in Southeast Europe and preventing the consolidation of the Eastern Bloc. This led Eisenhower to declare Yugoslavia "one of our greatest victories of the Cold War".

== In art and popular culture ==
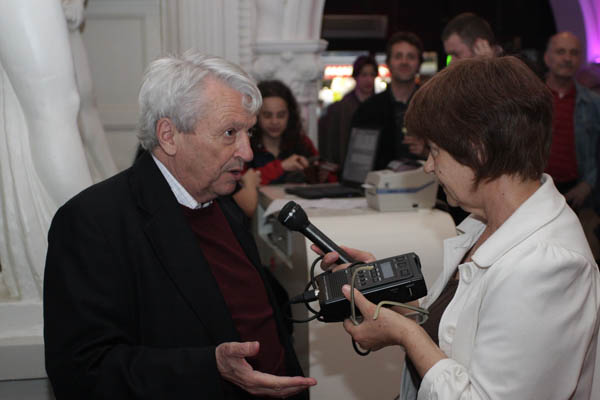
Predrag Matvejević coined the term "Goli Otok literature" to refer to works dealing with the period in the aftermath of the Yugoslav–Soviet rift.

In the immediate aftermath of the Tito–Stalin split, Yugoslav artists were encouraged to cover topics thought more fitting to the glorification of the ideology touted by the KPJ. In response, themes such as various aspects of then recent wartime struggle and contemporary construction of important infrastructure became popular among artists. The encouragement took the form of preferential treatment in the selection of works for various state-sponsored exhibitions. The policy was abandoned in the early 1950s in favour of Modernism and proclaimed artistic freedom. The break with the USSR also led to abandoning the monumentalist architecture style in favour of designs found in the West. The overall design of the new KPJ central committee building was changed to give the structure the appearance of an American skyscraper in an effort to contrast it from the Stalinist architecture. The same approach was applied to the Assembly of Slovenia and the Zagreb Assembly buildings. The split with the Eastern Bloc opened the country to Western popular culture and the revival of Yugoslav comics. There were also two early examples of treatment of the break with the USSR and the Cominform in Yugoslav cinema. Both are satirical works filmed in 1951. One is Tajna dvorca I. B. (The Secret of the I.B. Castle), a ballet pantomime written by Fadil Hadžić and directed by Milan Katić, while the other is Walter and Norbert Neugebauer's cartoon Veliki miting (The Big Meeting).

The period of the purges following the Tito–Stalin split was more extensively covered by Yugoslav writers, playwrights, and filmmakers since 1968 when Dragoslav Mihailović wrote his novel Kad su cvetale tikve (When the Pumpkins Blossomed) and especially in the 1980s. Particularly notable literary works were written by Puriša Đorđević, Ferdo Godina, Branko Hofman, Antonije Isaković, Dušan Jovanović, Dragan Kalajdžić, Žarko Komanin, Krsto Papić, Slobodan Selenić, Abdulah Sidran, Aleksandar Tišma, and Pavle Ugrinov contributing to what literary and social commentator Predrag Matvejević named the "Goli Otok literature" after the prison. In Yugoslavia, the period of purges following the 1948 Yugoslav–Soviet rift became referred to as the Informbiro period.

The Informbiro period was also revisited by Yugoslav plays and films especially in the 1980s. The most significant play on the topic was The Karamazovs by Dušan Jovanović which premiered in 1980. The most significant Yugoslav films on the topic are 1985 feature When Father Was Away on Business with its screenplay written by Sidran, and directed by Emir Kusturica; and Happy New Year '49, released a year later, written by Gordan Mihić and directed by Stole Popov. Other notable films dealing with the period are Evening Bells (1986) based on a novel by Mirko Kovač and directed by Lordan Zafranović, Dancing in Water (1986) written and directed by Jovan Aćin, and Balkan Spy (1984) co-directed by cinematographer Božidar Nikolić and playwright Dušan Kovačević.
