= Nebojša Glogovac =

Serbian actor (1969–2018)

- Небојша Глоговац
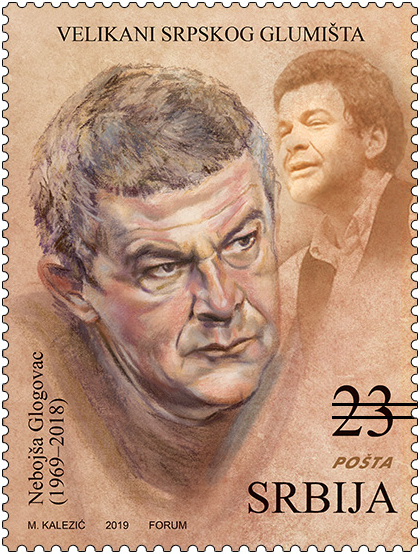
- Glogovac on a postage stamp issued in 2019.
- Born: 30 August 1969; Trebinje, SR Bosnia and Herzegovina, SFR Yugoslavia
- Died: 9 February 2018 (aged 48); Belgrade, Serbia
- Education: Faculty of Dramatic Arts
- Occupations: Actor, film producer
- Years active: 1987–2018

Nebojša "Glogi" Glogovac (Serbian Cyrillic: Небојша Глоговац; 30 August 1969 – 9 February 2018) was a Serbian actor, noted for his performances in theater, television and film.

He was a member of the Children's Drama Group of the Serbian Radio and Television, and he began his acting career at the Youth Atelier in Pančevo. In 1996, he received a scholarship from the Yugoslav Drama Theater and a role in the play The Great Robbery, directed by Dejan Mijač on the stage of Atelje 212. When he was a child, he appeared in the television show Price iz Nepričave (Stories from Nepricava) in 1981. He had his first film role in 1993 in the short film Rekvijem za jedan san (Requiem for a Dream) in the lead role, and after that the same year in the play Paradise by Petar Zec, where he was also one of the main actors. After drawing attention to his talent, he landed a role in director Gorčin Stojanović's film, Ubistvo s predumišljajem (Premeditated murder) in 1995.

He played the main roles in the films Premeditated murder, Cabaret Balkan, Sky Hook, When I Grow Up, I'll Be a Kangaroo, Klopka, Hadersfild, The Woman with a Broken Nose, The Man Who Defended Gavrilo Princip, Circles, Ravna Gora and the Constitution. He has been awarded many times for his roles in theater and film, and the Sterija Award, Emperor Constantine in Niš and the Golden Arena in Pula for the best male role stand out.

He died after a short and severe illness, at the Institute of Oncology and Radiology of Serbia in Belgrade, on 9 February 2018.

== Early life and family ==
Nebojša Glogovac was born on 30 August 1969 in Trebinje in FR Bosnia and Herzegovina to father Milovan and mother Milena Glogovac (née Samardžija). After finishing primary school, his father enrolled in the "Sveti Sava" seminary in Belgrade in 1962. He married Milena, Nebojša's mother, in 1968. Nebojša moved with his family from Trebinje to Opovo in 1974, and a year and a half later to Pančevo, where Nebojša's father was ordained a priest in the Church of the Assumption.

Glogovac's origins trace back to Dramiševo, while his family originally hailed from Kosovo. They adopted the surname "Glogovac" from the settlement of the same name. In the mid-19th century, his ancestors migrated to Herzegovina via Montenegro. The family eventually settled in the villages of Bratač and Dramiševo, and they traditionally celebrate St. George's Day.

Glogovac spent his first years living in Trebinje in a part of the city called Bregovi. He spent his early childhood playing with children in the yard near the Bey's house. As a child, he wanted to become a policeman. He also spent a significant time at the home of his grandparents, Gavrilo and Darinka, in the mountain village of Dramiševo, near Nevesinje.

Glogovac's grandfather Gavrilo was a Chetnik who spent ten years in prison in Foča for refusing to join the Partisans. Along with other locals, he drove a Partisan unit out of Dramiševo.

== Education ==
During his education at the Jovan Jovanović Zmaj primary school, Glogovac attended the Jovan Bandur Music school, clarinet department. After finishing primary school, he did not have enough qualification points to enter secondary school, so he enrolled in the "Technical School May 23rd" and after half a year he transferred to secondary school. He attended the Uroš Predić Gymnasium in Pancevo, and after the third year he decided to study natural sciences.

After high school he enrolled in psychology studies at the Faculty of Philosophy in Belgrade. After two years of studies, he changed his mind and in 1990 he enrolled in acting at the Belgrade Faculty of Dramatic Arts in the class of Professor Vladimir Jevtović. Gorica Popović was the assistant at the entrance exam for the university and Glogovac recited the song "Vragolije" by Branko Radićević. Nataša Ninković, Nela Mihailović, Daniela Kuzmanović, Danijela Ugrenović, Karolina Cimeša, Vojin Ćetković, Sergej Trifunović and Boris Pingović studied together with Glogovac.

During his studies, he played the role of school friend of Slobodan Popadić in the series Bolji život (1987).

While attending high school from 1985 and while studying at the Faculty of Philosophy in Belgrade, Glogovac was a member of the Youth Studio in Pančevo, and remained there until 1990, when he enrolled in the Faculty of Dramatic Arts at the persuasion of Milenko Zablaćanski and soon after he became a member of the Yugoslavian Drama Theater.

When he was twelve years old he became a member of the Children's Drama Group of the Radio Belgrade studio, with Mika Aleksić, where he stayed for a full six years and played in several plays. His first appearance on television came in 1981 when he landed a small role in the television series Priče iz Nepričave.

== Acting career ==
=== 1987–2000 ===
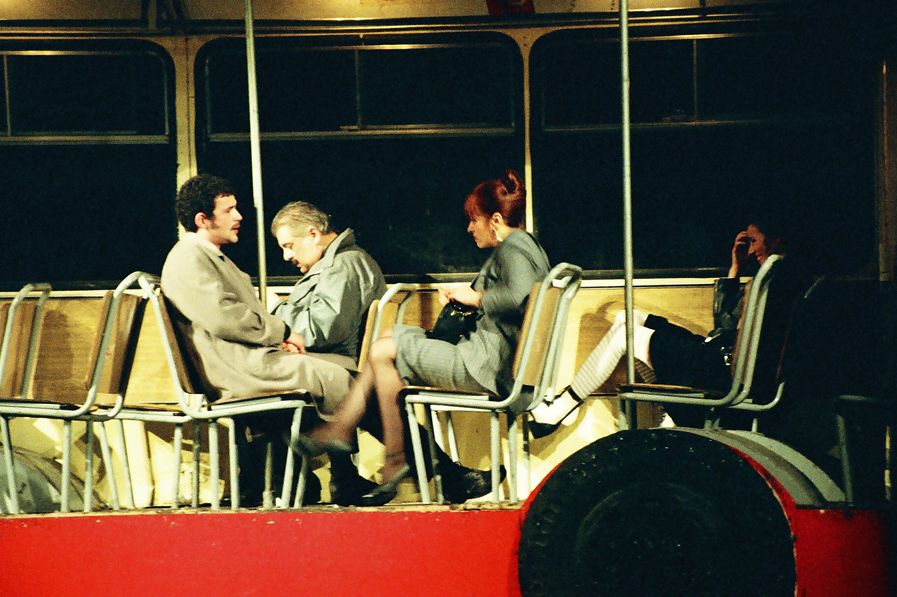
Nebojša Glogovac in the play Bure baruta, theater festival in Užice on 18 March 1995

He started his acting career at the Youth Studio in Pančevo, where he was a member from 1985 until 1990.

He had his first role "Mušica" in December 1989, a play directed by Milenko Zablaćanski and written by Eugène Ionesco. Glogovac played his first professional role in the Pančevo Cultural Center in 1990 in the play Živela sloboda, where he played the role of a German.

In his second year at the Faculty of Dramatic Arts in Belgrade, he gained a role in the play "The Great Robbery," directed by Dejan Mijač, on the stage of the Atelje 212 theater, which premiered on 9 August 1992. He made his debut at the Yugoslav Drama Theatre in the play "False Emperor Šćepan Mali," in the role of Niko Đurov, on 24 July 1993. This was followed by roles in "Troilus and Cressida," "Cousins from the Best Days," "Parabellum," and many others. Soon after that, he became a scholarship holder in 1996 and a permanent member of the Yugoslav Drama Theatre.

==== Television and film debut ====
He achieved his first serious television role in 1987 when he appeared in several episodes of the series "Bolji život," where he had a small role as a school friend of Slobodan Popadić. Glogovac appeared on film for the first time in 1993 in the main role of the short film "Requiem for a Dream," directed by Miloj Popović. In the drama "Raj (Heaven)" directed by Petar Zec, which premiered in 1993, he was one of the main actors, in the role of Birimić, a friend of Miloš Crnjanski, played by Tihomir Stanić.

==== Notable film roles and awards ====
He had a notable role in the play "Dark Night," which premiered in 1993 at the Kult Theater, experienced three hundred performances, became one of the most commercial plays, and was played on tours in the United States and Canada.

In 1994, he played the role of Fadil, a JNA soldier, in Boro Drašković's war drama "Vukovar, jedna priča"

After drawing attention to his talent, he received a role in the film directed by Gorčin Stojanović, "Premeditated Murder" (1995), in which he played the character of Bogdan, wounded in the Bosnian War, who is impatiently waiting for his recovery to return. For this role, he won the award for the best male role, Emperor Constantine, at the Niš Film Festival.

In 1996, he received the Ardalion Award for the role of Vladimir in the play "U potpalublju". He also played a significant role in his career in 1997 in the action drama "Rage", directed by Slobodan Skerlić. Glogovac portrayed Simke, a young criminal. This was followed by a role in the TV movie "Pokondirena tikva" in 1997, directed by Petar Zec, where Glogovac played the character of Jovan. In 1998, he starred in the TV series "Family Treasure" (1998–2002) in the role of Zlatko Gavrilović, after which he gained great popularity.

On the stage of the Zvezdara Teatar, he played Milan Srećković in the Serbian drama on 5 March 1994. A young man in the theatre piece "Parabellum" by Srđan Koljević premiered on 18 February 1998, and many other roles.

In the short film "Hotel Belgrade" from 1998, he played the character of Igor, and after that, he played in the film "Bure baruta", directed by Goran Paskaljević. In the same year, he played one of the main roles in the movie "Savior," where he portrayed Vera's brother, a raped Serbian woman who spent the war in a prison camp. This was followed by the role of the main character, Marko, in the film "Ranjena zemlja," which takes place in a Belgrade shelter during the NATO bombing of the FRY.

In 2000, he played in the movie "Nebeska udica," where he portrayed the character of Kaya, a young and promising basketball player. At the film festival in Berlin, where the film "Nebeska udica" participated in the main program, critics praised Glogovac's acting, compared him to George Clooney, and called him the Slavic Tom Hanks.

Based on a months-long survey, the daily newspaper Večernje Novosti compiled a list of the best actors and actresses in Serbia in 2000, and Glogovac took the 50th place.

=== 2001–2010 ===
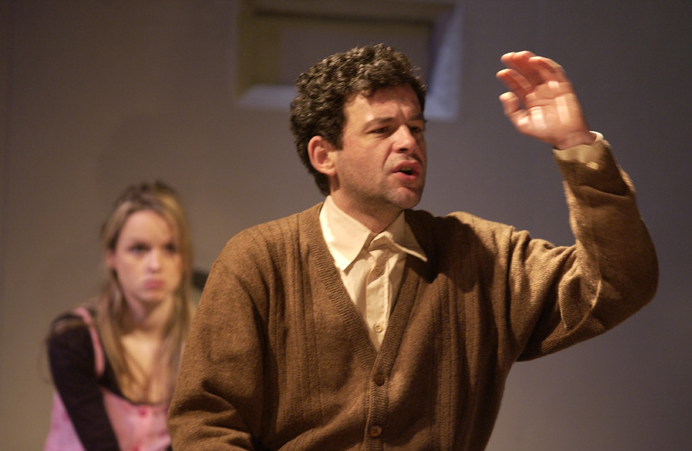
Nebojša Glogovac as Ivan in Hadersfild at the theatre festival in Užice on 26 February 2005.

At the beginning of 2001, Glogovac got a role in the movie "Munje!", where he played the role of a corrupt police officer who is prone to soft drugs. In the same year, he played Toma, an ambulance driver, in the movie "Normal People".

The following year, he starred in the films "Class of 2002" as Nebojša, the horror film "T.T. Syndrome," where he portrayed the role of Vaki, and in the film "Country of the Dead," directed by Živojin Pavlović and Dinko Tucaković, where Glogovac portrayed the character of Gorazd Kranjac.

At the 38th Film Meetings in Niš in 2003, he was part of the festival jury together with Vojin Ćetković.

In 2004, in the role of the taxi driver Živco, he starred in the film by Radivoj Andrić "When I Grow Up, I'll Be a Kangaroo," a film that won the Motovun Propeller Award at the Motovun Film Festival in the competition "From A to A" (the award for the best film in the region from Austria to Albania) and the Award for the best screenplay at the Film Screenplay Festival in Vrnjačka Banja in 2004. In the following years, he starred in the TV series "Lift" (2002) as officer Prvoslav Gajin and in the series "Basketball Players," where he played the role of coach Žare.

In 2005, he starred in the short film "Wedding" in the role of a mother-in-law, and in 2006, he portrayed doctor Milo Petrović in the film "The Optimists," directed by Goran Paskaljević.

In the crime thriller "Klopka" (2007), Glogovac got the main role as Mladen, a construction engineer who tries in every way to earn money to cure his seriously ill son. The movie is from 2007. In 2008, Klopka received the award for the best screenplay at the Film Screenplay Festival, awards at the festivals in Minsk, Milan, and Liege, and Glogovac received an award for the best male role in the film. In the film drama "Hadersfild," he played the role of Ivan, a former Judoist who went through a series of psychotic episodes and treatment in mental institutions before finally being baptized in the Eastern Orthodox Church. In addition to having one of the main roles in this film, Glogovac was also the film's producer. For this role, he received the "Sloboda" Statuette for the best male role at the Film Festival in Sopot and the "Naisa" Grand Prix, the audience award in Niš, in 2007. For the role of Ivan in the theater play "Hadersfild," which was performed throughout Serbia, in the United States and Canada, Glogovac received the Grand Prix for the best male role in Brčko, the Miloš Žutić Award from the Association of Fine Artists of Serbia, the "David Štrbac" Statuette in Banja Luka, and the Zoran Radmilović Award, the best actor of the Festival for the role of Ivan, in Zaječar.

In 2008, he appeared in the popular TV series "Vratiće se rode" in four episodes, in the role of Bora and Pera's father, and a few months later in the series "My Uncle," as an uncle in 13 episodes. The same year, he also starred in the series "Moj rođak sa sela" in the role of father Milutin, in 15 episodes, as well as in the documentary-feature film by Zdravko Šotra, Principality of Serbia, in the role of Prince Mihailo Obrenović.

In the first Serbian feature-length animated film Technotise: Edit & I, Glogovac lent his voice to the character Eddie.

In 2009, he played Boro in the Croatian film "Kenjac," and in 2010, he got the main role in the film "The Woman with a Broken Nose," where he portrayed the character of Gavrilo Bukola, a refugee from Bosnia and Herzegovina who works as a taxi driver in Belgrade. For this role, Glogovac received the award for the best male role at the Cinema City Film Festival in Novi Sad on 10 June 2010, as well as in 2017, he won the main festival prize Grand Prize "Naisa" at the Festival of Actors' Achievements in Film Encounters in Niš.

After a series of film and theater roles, Glogovac played policeman Dane in 2010 in the black comedy "72 Days," filmed in a Croatian-Serbian co-production, and then in the film "White White World" (2010) in the role of Zlatan. In the period from 2010 to 2011, he starred in the Bosnian comedy TV series "Lud, zbunjen, normalan" in the role of Grdob. At the end of 2010, he appeared in one episode of the Croatian comedy series "Instructor" as a taxi driver.

=== 2011—2018 ===
At the beginning of 2011, he played a traffic cop in the TV series "Igra istine," the filming of which was stopped after only one filmed episode. In 2012, he got a role in the short film "Zalet" and in the TV series "Military Academy," where he played the role of Blacky(Crni). In the same year, he starred in the films "When Day Breaks(Kad svane dan)" as Mališa, "Artillero" as Zlaja, and in the short Croatian film "Out of Season" as Đino.

In March 2012, together with Bojana Ordinačev, Vuk Kostić, Viktor Savić, and Nataša Ninković, he was a member of the jury of the J Factory film competition.

In 2013, he starred in the anti-war melodrama "Krugovi (Circles)," in the role of Nebojsa. The film won a large number of awards at national and international festivals, and Glogovac won the award for the best male role in the film at the Cinema City International Festival.

In Kosta Đorđević's debut film "S/Kidanje" (2013), Glogovac played the role of Bojan, and in the same year, he appeared in the second season of the series "Žene sa Dedinja," in the role of Emil, the Croatian series "Stella," in the role of Lukas Gavran, and in one episode of the TV series "Otvorena vrata," in the role of Dostoyevsky.

From 2013 until 2014, he starred in the Drama Trilogy 1941–1945 series, portraying the role of Chetnik commander Draža Mihailović. In 2014, he also featured in the French short drama film Storžina as Dragan, and in the film The Kids from the Marx and Engels Street. Collaborating with Katarina Gojković, Nikola Vuković, and Anja Knežević, he recorded the children's song "Moj ujak i ja(My uncle and I)," included in the 2014 music album Dečje zavrzlame i ostale kerefeke za mame, tate, bake i deke (Children's tangles and other kerefeks for mothers, fathers, grandmothers and grandfathers) by Radivoj Radivojević.

After numerous film roles, Glogovac secured a part in the short film Sjene(Shadows) (2014), where he portrayed psychiatrist Dr. Martin Pappenheim. In the same year (2014), he also landed a role in the omnibus Jednaki (Equal), directed by Dejan Karaklajić.

In Srđan Koljević's film "The Man Who Defended Gavrilo Princip" (2014), Glogovac played Leo Pfeffer, reprising the role in the 2015 series of the same name.

In 2015, he starred in the film "Enclave," focusing on Serbs living in Kosovo and Metohija after 1999. Glogovac portrayed Vojislav Arsić, a peasant in Kosovo and Metohija. He also played a significant role in Radoš Bajić's film "Za kralja i otadžbinu (For the king and the country)" (2015), portraying Dragoljub Mihailović for the second time in his career. He has received an award of Best Actor at the 20th Milivoj Živanović Acting Festival in Požarevac for his role as Judge Adam in the play "The Broken Jug" played by Yugoslav Drama Theatre.

In Oleg Novković's film "Otadžbina (Motherland)" (2015), Glogovac portrayed Bolet, a successful businessman, and in the 2016 Macedonian film "The Liberation of Skopje", he played the role of Serb Dušan.

He appeared in the role of Edgar Hoover in the multimedia project FBI – Tesla Files, 2016, authored and directed by Nele Karajlić. The project was made into a film format, and the premiere was on 19 November 2016 at the Serbian National Theatre.

Glogovac often starred in foreign films, including the film The Constitution from 2016. In 2016, he played the role of high school teacher Vjek Kralj, for which he received the International Film Journalists Association Award for Best Actor and many others. In the period 2016–2018, in 2017, he starred in the crime series My Father's Killers, where he played the role of Jovan Despotović. In 2017, he started with the role of Father Žika in the short film Tihi kutak Hristov, and after that the same year he had roles in the films Saga of Three Innocent Men as Damjan's uncle and in the humorous film The Books of Knjige – Slučajevi pravde as Bledi Globičić Prokopnik.

He has repeatedly refused roles in foreign films, those he considered propaganda against the Serbian people, including a role in the film In the Land of Blood and Honey. He also emphasized that he is not interested in a career abroad, where he would play Slav pimps and criminals, as well as because he has an established status as an actor in Serbia.

Glogovic's role models were the Soviet and Russian actor Innokenty Smoktunovsky and the Serbian actor Milenko Zablaćanski.

== Teaching career ==
In addition to acting he taught acting at Theater 78, at the "First Steps" acting school in Belgrade and at the "Mask" acting school.

== Other ventures ==
Glogovac's stories about the relationship between man and dog are represented in the books Paw in the Hand and Shine in the Eyes. It is represented in the 2018 books Untold Stories by Croatian director Rajko Grlić and Ne damo svetinje by Serbian poet Slavko Perošević.

=== Philanthropy ===
Glogovac was the official promoter of the derby match of the 8th round of the Serbian Super League playoffs in handball between Partizan and Crvena Zvezda, which was played in March 2014, and was of a humanitarian nature, to help those threatened by floods in Serbia in 2014.

He acted in a large number of humanitarian plays for children, donated money for the restoration of churches and monasteries, and repeatedly helped his colleagues from the acting stage financially. In 2009, he appeared in a commercial, as part of a campaign promoting the fight against breast cancer. The following year, he cut a lock of his hair as a sign of support for children suffering from cancer and their parents, as part of the Strand of Hope campaign. He participated in the charity campaign WannaGive – Because someone else's happiness is my happiness, organized by UNICEF and Wannabe magazine. He was one of the participants in the "Cherish Serbian language" campaign.

== Personal life ==
=== Marriages and children ===
From 1997 to 2014, Nebojša was married to Mina Glogovac, a painter and assistant professor of Painting Techniques at the Faculty of Applied Arts in Belgrade. The two met at the Zvezda nightclub in Belgrade and were married on 30 August 1997, coinciding with his 28th birthday. They had two sons together – Gavrilo, born in 1999, and Miloš, born in 2001. Both attended the Fifth Belgrade High School. In 2020, Miloš enrolled at the Faculty of Dramatic Arts in Belgrade, majoring in film and TV directing.

Two years after his divorce, Glogovac had a daughter, Sunčica, with his second wife, Milica Šćepanović — a yoga instructor and former journalist. The couple lived in Dorćol. They met after the premiere of the film "Hadersfild," when Milica, then a journalist, approached him for an interview.

Vojin Ćetković was Glogovac's wedding godfather, as well as the godfather of his children with Mina.

=== Residence ===
Glogovac has resided in Gundulićev venac, briefly in Bežanijska Kosa, as well as in Dorćol.

=== Interests ===
In addition to acting he was a passionate lover of horseback riding, dogs, backgammon, cars and motorcycles, he loved cooking, and in his childhood he practiced handball.

He practiced drawing and wrote poetry. He was a member of the Association for Galloping Sport of Serbia and the Association of Dramatic Artists of Serbia.

He was a supporter of Crvena zvezda and was a candidate for a member The assembly of FC Crvena zvezda in the first direct elections 2012. year. Together with his colleague Goran Šušljik he founded the film production company -{Eye to Eye}- whose debut was the movie Hadersfild.

== Death ==
Glogovac died at the age of 48, on 9 February 2018, in Belgrade's Institute for Oncology and Radiology of Serbia, shortly after his diagnosis with lung cancer. He is survived by his second wife and three children.

== Selected filmography ==
=== Selected film ===
Year	Title	Role	Notes
1994	Vukovar poste restante	Fadil	
1995	Ubistvo s predumišljajem (a.k.a. Premeditated Murder, US)	Bogdan Bilogorac	
1996	Do koske (a.k.a. Rage)	Simke	
1998	Savior	Vera's Brother	
1999	Bure baruta	The Chain-Smoking Taxi Driver	
1999	Ranjena zemlja	Marko	
2000	Nebeska udica (a.k.a. Sky Hook (International: English title)	Kaja	
2001	Normalni ljudi	Toma	
2001	Munje!	Pandur	
2002	Država mrtvih (a.k.a. Janez)	Gorazd Kranjc	
2004	Kad porastem biću Kengur	Žika Živac, taksista	
2005	Poroka	Tašta	
2006	Tomorrow Morning	Mare	
2006	The Optimists	Dr Milo Petrović	
2007	Hadersfild (a.k.a. Huddersfield)	Ivan, the neighbour	
2009	Kenjac	Boro	
2010	Zena sa slomljenim nosem	Čamango	
2010	72 Days	Policajac Dane	
2010	White White World	Zlatan	
2012	When Day Breaks	Mališa	
2012	Artiljero	Zlaja	
2013	Circles	Nebojša	
2014	The Man Who Defended Gavrilo Princip	Leo Pfefer	
2015	Enklava	Vojislav Arsić	
2016	The Constitution	Vjeko Kralj	
2017	Saga o 3 nevina muskarca	Damjanov stric	
2018	South Wind	Golub	
2019	Moj jutarnji smeh	Miloš	

=== Selected television ===
Year	Title	Role	Notes
1987	Bolji život	Boba's schoolmate	
1998	Porodično blago	Zlatko Gavrilović	
2001	Porodično blago 2	Zlatko Gavrilović	
2005	Košarkaši	Žare	
2017	Nemanjići – rađanje kraljevine	Vukan Nemanjić	

== Bibliography ==
- Nježić, Tatjana (2018). Nebojša Glogovac:monografija. Belgrade: Vulkan. ISBN 978-86-85421-15-0.
- Đuričić, Aleksandar (2021). Glogi. Belgrade: Vukotić medija. ISBN 9788681510254.

Awards
Preceded by Milan Gutović	Serbian Oscar Of Popularity; The Male Actor of the Year; 2010	Succeeded by TBD
