= Mladen Hren =

Croatian actor

- Born: 5 August 1998 (age 27); Zagreb, Croatia
- Occupation: Actor
- Years active: 2013–present

Mladen Hren (born 5 August 1998) is a Croatian film, television and theater actor.

== Filmography ==
=== Film ===
Year	Title	Role	Notes
2013	Srami se!	Mladen	Short film
2016	The Constitution	Ivan Stazić	
2018	Kako je Lik dosegnuo nevjerojatne sposobnosti	Student	

=== Television ===
Year	Title	Role	Notes
2016	Prava žena	Hockey player	Episode: #1.22
2018	Sigurno u prometu	businessman	HRT
2019	McDonald's		Television/Internet ad
2019	Club der singenden Metzgen	Johannes	TV mini-series (Germany)

=== Stage ===
Year	Title	Role	Venue
2013	The Ant and the Grasshopper	Ant Noa	Gradsko kazalište Trešnja
2014	Anđeli imaju krila, zar ne?	Angel, Gangster, Orphan	Gradsko kazalište Trešnja
2018	Trešnjalot	King Arthur	Kazalište Točka na i
2019	Lady of the Lake	Cyrano	Croatian National Theatre in Zagreb
