= Isidora Bjelica =

Serbian writer (1966–2020)

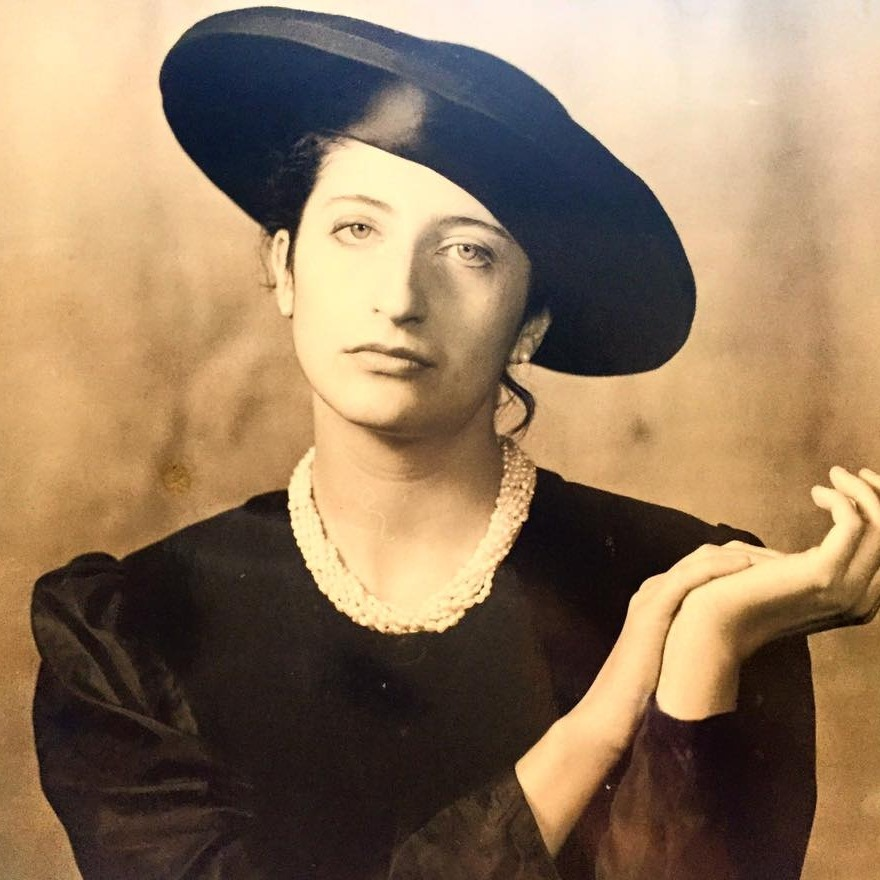
- Born: 10 December 1966; Sarajevo, SR Bosnia and Herzegovina, SFR Yugoslavia
- Died: 5 August 2020 (aged 53); Belgrade, Serbia
- Resting place: Belgrade New Cemetery
- Education: University of Belgrade
- Occupations: Novelist, playwright
- Spouse: Nebojša Pajkić
- Children: 2, including Lav
- Relatives: Dimitrije Bjelica (father)
- Writing career
- Language: Serbian
- Period: 1986–2020
- Genres: Drama, romance

Isidora Bjelica (Serbian Cyrillic: Исидора Бјелица; 10 December 1966 – 5 August 2020) was a Serbian prose writer, playwright and public figure.

== Early life and career ==
Bjelica was born in Sarajevo where she graduated from gymnasium. She then moved to Belgrade where she graduated from the Faculty of Dramatic Arts, department of dramaturgy. She obtained MA from dramaturgy. Bjelica produced over 55 books - novels, short story collections, plays, travel books and screenplays. She also worked as a columnist for several magazines and newspapers.

== Personal life ==
Bjelica was the daughter of chess author and journalist Dimitrije Bjelica. She was married to professor Nebojša Pajkić, who co-authored one of her books. They lived in Belgrade and had a son, Lav and a daughter Vila Evangelina.

== Death ==
She died on 5 August 2020 in Belgrade after a long battle with ovarian cancer.

== Bibliography ==
=== Essays ===
- Mali vodič za ljubavnu sreću (The small guide for love happiness)
- Kako preživeti porođaj u Srbiji (How to survive a childbirth in Serbia)
- Biblija za kupoholičarke (The shopaholics Bible)

=== Novels ===
- Ozloglašena (Notorious)
- Protokoli Politart mudraca (The Protocols of the Elders of Politart), co-authored with Nebojša Pajkić
- 101 muškarac u četiri godišnja doba (101 men in four seasons)
- Poslednji hrišćanin (Last Christian)
- Ljubav u Tunisu (Love in Tunisia)
- Ljubav u Kairu (Love in Cairo)
- Ljubav u Emiratima (Love in the Emirates)
- Ljubav u Bejrutu (Love in Beirut)
- Ljubav u Maroku (Love in Morocco)
- Dama iz Santorinija (Lady from Santorini)
- Dama iz Monaka (Lady from Monaco)
- Novac, strasti, laži (Money, passions, lies)
- Nepristojna pisma muškarcima (Indecent letters to men)
- Moj život, moj skandal (My life, my scandal)
- Tajna knjiga (Secret book)
- Put oko sveta za 25 dana (Round the world in 25 days)
- Apostoli urbanog Beograda (Apostles of urban Belgrade)
- Moj deda Luj Viton (My grandfather Louis Vuitton)
- Srpkinja (Serbian lady)
- Kad kume kuvaju (When godmothers cook), co-authored with Vesna Radusinović.
- Santa Maria (Santa Maria)
- Magija šešira (Magic of the hats)
- Roman o preljubi (Novel of infidelity)
- Tajna Titovog kreveta (Tito's bed secret)
- Kazablanka (Casablanca)
- Avato ili Žena poslednjeg despota (Avato or Last despot's wife)
- Zbog njih sam volela Beograd (Because of them I loved Belgrade)
- Upomoc, prijateljice! (Help, friend!)

=== Non-fiction ===
- Tajni život slavnih Srpkinja (Secret life of famous Serbian women), 1997
- Princeze di Montenegro (Princess of Montenegro), 1998
- Kraljice Serbske (Serbian Queens), 2001
- Tajni život P.P. Njegoša (Secret life of P.P. Njegoš)
- Tajna društva u Srbiji (Secret societies in Serbia), co-authored with Nebojša Pajkić
- Najveće misterije srbske istorije (The biggest mysteries of Serbian history)

=== Short stories ===
- Prvi probudjeni (First awakened), 1986
- Gospodar srećnih predmeta (Lord of happy subjects), 1989
- Ženske priče (Women's stories), 2001
- Živeti i umreti na Karibima (Living and dying in the Caribbean), 2001

== Filmography ==
=== Film ===
- Dorćol - Menhetn, 2000, writer and director

=== Television ===
- Šesto čulo, 2010, writer (1 episode - uncredited)
