= The Constitution (film) =

2016 film by Rajko Grlić

- Croatian: Ustav Republike Hrvatske
- Directed by: Rajko Grlić
- Written by: Ante Tomić; Rajko Grlić
- Produced by: Ivan Maloča; Rudolf Biermann; Dejan Miloševski; Jani Sever; Mike Downey; Sam Taylor; Josefina Borecka; Maja Vukić
- Starring: Nebojša Glogovac; Ksenija Marinković; Dejan Aćimović; Božidar Smiljanić; Mladen Hren
- Cinematography: Branko Linta
- Edited by: Andrija Zafranović
- Music by: Duke Bojadziev
- Production companies: Interfilm; In Film Praha; Revolution; Sever & Sever
- Distributed by: HRT; Synergetic Distribution (United States)
- Release date: August 2016; (Montreal World Film Festival)
- Running time: 93 min
- Country: Croatia
- Languages: Croatian; Serbian
- Budget: HRK 4 million (c. €530,000)

The Constitution (Croatian: Ustav Republike Hrvatske, lit. 'The Constitution of the Republic of Croatia') is a 2016 Croatian drama film directed by Rajko Grlić, starring Nebojša Glogovac, Ksenija Marinković, Dejan Aćimović, and Božidar Smiljanić. The script was written by Ante Tomić and Grlić. It premiered on August 4, 2016 at the Montreal Film Festival.

The story centers on four residents of the same apartment building whose contrasting backgrounds and beliefs keep them apart. Although they rarely interact, a series of difficult circumstances forces them into contact. Their lives entangle in ways that profoundly challenge deep-held beliefs and prejudices surrounding material status, sexual orientation, nationality and religion.

== Plot ==
The film is a story of four people who live in the same apartment building in downtown Zagreb, but are wary of each other because they don't share the same ethnic and religious backgrounds and sexual preferences. A humorous subplot about a dog poisoner permeates the entire film.

Vjekoslav Kralj is a high school history professor who, despite being a homosexual and a transvestite, is also an ardent Croatian nationalist, influenced by his aged Ustasha father, with whom he lives. While walking at night dressed as a woman, Vjekoslav is beaten by a group of hooligans. He is found and taken to a hospital, where he accidentally encounters his neighbour Maja Samardžić, who works there as a nurse. Maja's husband, Ante, a police officer and ethnic Serb, is having trouble studying for a Croatian citizenship exam, which consists of memorizing the Croatian Constitution, due to his dyslexia.

Vjekoslav returns home, but has trouble taking care of himself and his father because of his injuries. Maja volunteers to help them out and refuses money from Vjekoslav, instead asking him if he could help Ante with studying, to which Vjekoslav agrees. During their first session, however, Vjekoslav expresses disdain towards Serbs and the idea of them holding positions in the Croatian police force, to which a worked up Ante responds with a derogatory comment about homosexuals, cutting the meeting short with both men offended. While treating Vjekoslav, Maja asks if they could arrange another meeting. Vjekoslav tells Maja that she did not have to marry a Serb, to which she responds that "love doesn't pick and choose". As they talk, Maja reveals that Ante served in the Croatian military, in which he enlisted out of fear during the Yugoslav Wars in the 1990s, while Maja was pregnant. Due to stress, she had a miscarriage, which made her unable to bear children. Maja and Ante are shown in a meeting with a social worker, trying to obtain a child adoption license. As her and Vjekoslav continue to talk and get closer, Vjekoslav shows Maja his closet full of clothes his mother had sown. Maja finds his father's Ustasha uniform and questions Vjekoslav on his ability to hold hardcore nationalist beliefs as a homosexual, to which he responds with an anecdote about the Sacred Band of Thebes.

In the meantime, Ante spots the dog poisoner through a cafe window, but doesn't catch him and leaves for a second session with Vjekoslav. When he notices that Ante is tipsy, Vjekoslav tells him to get out. They once again confront each other when Ante tells Vjekoslav to at least be transparent about his hatred of Serbs, to which Vjekoslav responds by calling Serbs madmen and murderers. He recalls a traumatic childhood memory of him and his mother being stripped and laughed at by Serbian police officers while visiting his father in jail. Ante attempts to emphasize that he is different, but Vjekoslav is persistent and confident that most Croats feel the same way as him. Ante challenges the notion by saying that the Croats then need a new constitution, free of non-Croats and homosexuals, and leaves. The next day, Vjekoslav attempts to take care of his father alone, but he aggressively requests Maja to return. Vjekoslav asks Maja to come by and leaves her his keys for when he is at work. Maja tells Vjekoslav that he is capable only of hatred, which prompts him to open up to her about his relationship with his long-term lover Bobo and the grief he experienced after Bobo's cancer diagnosis and suicide that took place a year prior. Vjekoslav tells Maja of his plan to also commit suicide once his father dies.

At home, Maja discusses the possibility of getting Vjekoslav's apartment with Ante. Although still angry with Vjekoslav, Ante goes on a one-man mission to find his attackers. Meanwhile, Vjekoslav and Maja, now on friendly terms, continue talking as he does her makeup and dresses up himself. The next day, Ante and Vjekoslav meet up again, this time with minor success, as Vjekoslav teaches Ante a trick to remember learned material more easily. Later, Ante pursues one of Vjekoslav's attackers, but gets in trouble which Vjekoslav gets him out of thanks to his government connections. Vjekoslav also hears from officials about excellent police work Ante has done over the years. At school, a student talks to Vjekoslav alone, asking him about advice on and experience with coming out. That night, a drunk Vjekoslav reminisces about Bobo and his mother next to his lethargic father.

Tensions loosen up between neighbours and Vjekoslav starts spending time with Maja and Ante. With his help, Ante passes the exam, while Maja gets the news that they've been approved for adoption. At home, Vjekoslav finds his father dead. He dresses him in his uniform and calls a priest, then proceeds to dress up and go outside, heading for the bench where Bobo shot himself. Ante and Maja visit Vjekoslav's apartment, but upon finding a priest instead, Maja realises where Vjekoslav has headed. They run outside and find Vjekoslav on the bench, unable to go through with his suicide plan. Calming him down, they ask him if he wants to be their child's godfather, which he gladly accepts.

The next day, overjoyed Maja and Ante go on a motorbike trip before they officially become parents. They tell Vjekoslav that they will name their child after him and leave. Outside, the dog poisoner is seen walking down the street.

== Cast ==
- Nebojša Glogovac as Vjekoslav Kralj
- Ksenija Marinković as Maja Samardžić
- Dejan Aćimović as Ante Samardžić
- Božidar Smiljanić as Hrvoje Kralj
- Mladen Hren as Ivan Stazić
- Matija Cigir as Bobanović
- Zdenko Jelčić as Father Tomislav
- Robert Ugrina as Damir Pivac
- Željko Königsknecht as Miroslav Pleše
- Jelena Jovanova as police officer
- Berislav Tomičić as police officer
- Radomir Sarajan as dog poisoner
- Luka Dragić as Jožo Sloković
- Darija Lorenci as social worker
- Željko Duvnjak as bartender
- Stanislav Kovačić as Bobo
- Nina Rakovec as waitress
- Zoran Pušić as himself
- Tomislav Kličko as himself
- Čedo Prodanović as himself

== Release ==
The film was theatrically released in Europe in 2016 but only in May 2018 in the United States.

== Reception ==
The film has been described as follows: "The Constitution is a whistleblowing film that touches on a series of social, political and ethnic issues still unresolved in the former Yugoslav territories." and a "dramatic comedy spotlighting the microcosm of a neighborhood community to present a parable about the animosities underlying the civil war in the former Yugoslavia, enduring tensions that persist to this day."

== Accolades ==
=== Awards ===
- Montréal World Film Festival, 2016 - Grand Prix des Amériques for Best film
- Pula Film Festival, 2017 - Best Actor in a Leading Role
- Santa Barbara International Film Festival, 2017 - Best International Film
- Slovene Film Festival, 2016 - Best Costume Design, Best Minority Coproductions
- Raindance Film Festival, 2017 - Best Film, Best Screenplay, Best Performance (Nebojša Glogovac)
- Festival del Cinema Europeo, 2017 - Best film, Best Screenplay, Best European Actor (Nebojša Glogovac)
- Filmski Susreti, 2017 - Best Role (Nebojša Glogovac)
- CinEast, 2017 - Best Feature Film

=== Nominations ===
- Festival of European films in Paris, 2018 - Best Feature Film
- Croatian Cinematographers Society Award, 2017 - Best Cinematography in Feature Film
