= Nova borba =

Nova borba ('New Struggle') was a Serbo-Croatian weekly newspaper published in Prague, by exiled Yugoslav Cominformists. It was printed in Roman alphabet. The publication was intended for clandestine distribution inside Yugoslavia.

Nova borba was the first émigré Cominformist publication. It was founded by two former staff members of the Yugoslav embassy in Washington D.C., Slobodan-Lale Ivanović (who served as its editor-in-chief) and Pero Dragila. Nova borba began publication in early October 1948. It obtained a publishing permit from the Czechoslovak Ministry of Information (allegedly issued in response to the banning of foreign communist periodicals in Yugoslavia), and was printed at the printing shop of the Svoboda newspaper. Nova borba was published by the Committee of Yugoslav Revolutionary Emigrants in the People's Republic of Czechoslovakia.

Nova borba became the epicentre of Cominformist exiles in Prague, and the group behind it maintained links to Bedřich Geminder (in charge of the Foreign Section of the Communist Party of Czechoslovakia). The group linked to Nova Borba (organized in the Pressmen's Club) also began issuing a youth-oriented newspaper, Mladi revolucionar ('Young Revolutionary'). Once Nova borba began publication the Yugoslav embassy in Prague issued a protest towards the Czechoslovak government, charging it with having provided support for the publication. The Yugoslav government labelled the group behind Nova borba as 'traitors'.

Nova borba had a particular focus on the conditions of Yugoslav emigrant communities in the United States and other locations.

The publication was soon to be overshadowed by a new Moscow-based Cominformist organ, Za socijalističku Jugoslaviju ('For a Socialist Yugoslavia').

In its August 8, 1949 issue Nova borba called for a 'true Marxist–Leninist Communist Party of Yugoslavia' to be reestablished. Similar calls would later appear in other émigré Cominformist organs, but no such party formation materialized.

In August 1956 a Yugoslav court sentenced two former Nova borba editors, Milutin Rajković and Jovan Prodanović, to eight and five years imprisonment.
