= Za socijalističku Jugoslaviju =

Za socijalističku Jugoslaviju (English: "For a socialist Yugoslavia") was a newspaper published in Moscow, Soviet Union, by Yugoslav Cominformist exiles. The newspaper began appearing around 1949. Za socijalističku Jugoslaviju soon overtook the role as the main organ of the Cominformist emigration from Nova borba (published from Prague). Its contributors included Pero Popivoda, Radonja Golubović, Slobodan Ćekić, Anton Rupnik (member of the Executive Committee of the World Federation of Trade Unions), Bosiljka Marijanović (member of the Executive Committee of the Women's International Democratic Federation), Momčilo Ješić, Viktor Vidmar, Asim Alihodžić and Aleksandar Opojević.
