= Vesna Perić =

Serbian dramaturge, screen writer and film critic

Vesna Perić (Belgrade, 1972) is a Serbian dramaturge, screenwriter, film critic, theorist and prose writer. She is the editor-in-chief of the national Drama Program of Radio Belgrade. She holds a PhD in film and media studies.

== Biography ==
Education

She finished elementary school and high school in Belgrade, as well as elementary music school "Mokranjac" (department of violin). She studied the Faculty of Civil Engineering in Belgrade. She graduated from the Faculty of Dramatic Arts in Belgrade in 2003 at the Department of Dramaturgy.

With thesis Memory and the film romantic comedy: deconstruction of narrative temporality (Memorija i filmska romantična komedija: dekonstrukcija narativne temporalnosti) she obtained her master's degree at the Film and Media Studies Group of FDA in 2009, and she had doctoral thesis Theory of Narrative Structures in Post-Yugoslav Film from 1994 to 2008 (Teorija narativnih konstrukcija u postjugoslovenskom filmu od 1994. do 2008. godine) (under mentorship of prof. Nevena Daković).

Career

Since 2002, she has been working as a film critic and journalist at the Second Program of Radio Belgrade, where she has been the editor-in-chief of the Drama Program since 2010. She is the author of eleven radio dramas broadcast on Radio Belgrade. She is the author of the dramatic text What is her fault, nothing is her fault at all (Šta je ona kriva nije ništa ona kriva) awarded at the Hartefakt Competition for Best Social Awareness Drama of 2012 (premiering in 2015 at Bitef Theater directed by Anđelka Nikolić).

Her short stories were published in the anthologies of Earthly Gifts (Zemaljski darovi) ("Everything about My Grandma" (Sve o mojoj baki) and the Long Sky Passenger (Putnik sa dalekog neba) ("Color of an Apparition" Boja priviđenja) dedicated to Ivo Andrić and Miloš Crnjanski (Laguna publishing house, 2012 and 2013), as well as in The stories about Savamala (Priče o Savamali) ( "The pleasure to be alone" (Slast biti sam), Arhipelag 2013), in the ProFemina magazines, the Belgrade Literary Magazine (Beogradski književni magazin) and the Charter, (Povelja) as well as on the Art Anima portal. The stories were published in English – Hourglass ("Besa"), Best European Fiction 2019 ("What she's done"), Dalkey Archive Press, and Take Six: Six Balkan Women Writers ("Fragment F"), Dedalus Books, as well as in the German language – Keine Delicatessen (Play it again, Cage) and perspectives ("Wir sind hier auf diese Erde").

As an active film critic, she published film reviews and essays in the cultural supplement of Politika (2007–2018) and occasionally cooperates with Chronicles of FEST. She is a member of the Serbian branch of FIPRESCI.

Literary and film essays were published in the journal Ulaznica: "The end of humanism in the antiutopian trilogy of Rabidness, Atlantis and 1999 by Borislav Pekić", "The Jung's Term of Synchronicity and Non-Linear Dramaturgy in Cinematic Works" ("Kraj humanizma u antiutopijskoj trilogiji Besnilo, Atlantida i 1999 Borislava Pekića“; „Jungov pojam sinhroniciteta i nelinearna dramaturgija u filmskim ostvarenjima").

As a screenwriter she is featured in the "Awakening" anthology /Buđenje/, which brought together female comic writers and artists from the region (Dibidus, Belgrade, 2018). She was screenwriter of children's educational program "Film Graffiti" (Filmski grafiti, RTS, 2002).

She publishes theoretical papers on the film in the Proceedings of the Faculty of Dramatic Arts (Zbornik Fakulteta dramskih umetnosti) and the magazines Limes and Kultura. She worked as a free copywriter.

A variant of her PHD thesis is published as Trauma and post-Yugoslav cinema: Narrative strategies (Trauma i postjugoslovenski film: narativne strategije) (Film center of Serbia, 2019).

== Radio drama ==
- You, crocodile of my soul: A. P. Chekhov /Krokodilu duše moje: A. P. Čehov/
- A miracle ring /Čudotvorni prsten/
- Save your waltz for me: Scott Fitzgerald /Sačuvaj valcer za mene: Skot Ficdžerald/
- Existence, gigantic and voluptuous: P. P. Njegoš /Žiće, gigantsko i sladostrastno: P. P. Njegoš/
- The life and works of the immortal Uncle Ilija Stanojević /Život i dela besmrtnog Čiča Ilije Stanojevića/
- Archangel of History: Gavrilo Princip /Arhanđeo istorije: Gavrilo Princip/
- We have only a few winters on this Earth /Na zemlji smo samo nekoliko zima/
- Black Star: David Bowie /Crna zvezda: Dejvid Bouvi/
- Fifteen minutes of glory: Andy Warhol /Petnaest minuta slave: Endi Vorhol/
- Sixty Eight: Youth is our privilege /Šezdeset osma: Mladost je naša privilegija/
- Apostle of solitude: Isidora Sekulić /Apostolka samoće: Isidora Sekulić/
