= Uglješa Šajtinac =

Serbian writer and playwright (born 1971)

- Born: 1 October 1971 (age 55)
- Education: University of Arts in Belgrade (1999)
- Occupations: Novelist, children's book author, theater playwright, and university professor
- Writing career
- Notable awards: European Union Prize for Literature (2014); Isidora Sekulić Award (2017)

Uglješa Šajtinac (Serbian Cyrillic: Угљеша Шајтинац; born 1 October 1971) is a Serbian novelist, children's book author, theater playwright, and university professor in Novi Sad. His mother, Gordana, is an actress at the town's National Theater, and his father, Radivoj, is a writer of cultural policy articles in various journals. Šajtinac is the husband of Sonja Veselinović. They both live in Zrenjanin.

Šajtinac's paternal grandfather, who was born in Šumadija, was a combat veteran in the Partizan Brigade of Žarko Zrenjanin.

Šajtinac studied at the Faculty of Dramatic Arts of Belgrade's University of Arts, graduated in 1999, and worked as a dramaturge at the Serbian National Theatre in Novi Sad from 2003 to 2005. He then became a professor at the Academy of Arts of the University of Novi Sad.

In theatre history, Šajtinac is the single Serbian playwright whose play Huddersfield was initially performed in English as a world premiere at Leeds Playhouse in 2004, inspired to write this play after visiting that town in 2000; the Serbian performance was shown at the Yugoslav Drama Theatre in 2005, and the German performance at Volksbühne Berlin.

He received the Sterijina Award for his play at the Sterijino pozorje Festival in 2005, and he participated in creating the screenplay for the same-named film.

Šajtinac wrote a dramatized adaptation of the novel Robinson Crusoe, which was performed by Theatre Playground under the title Life On A Desert Island as a family show for children in Central Park, Riverside Park, and Prospect Park in New York City in 2009. The Serbian premiere was in 2003, and his second play, based on a story from the novel Robinson and the Pirates, was performed the following year.

In 2010, Šajtinac participated as a co-author in creating the play Danube Drama or Awful Coffee, Cheap Cigarettes, which was realized by Wortstaetten as an international drama project, written by ten authors from ten countries, and staged by the Slovak Theater without Home in Bratislava.

Šajtinac is a laureate of several major literary prizes, such as the Biljana Jovanović Award 2007 for Walk on!, the Ivo Andrić Award 2014 for Banatorium, the European Union Prize for Literature 2014 for his novel Quite Modest Gifts, and the Isidora Sekulić Award 2017 for his collected short stories The Woman from Juárez, which contain narrations about individuals of global migration and its political causes. The novel Quite Modest Gifts has been published in Italian, Bulgarian, Hungarian, Slovenian, Macedonian, and Ukrainian translations.

The International Youth Library added Šajtinac's children's book Gang Of Undesirable Pets (Banda neželjenih ljubimaca) to the White Ravens List for recommendable children's and youth literature 2019. Šajtinac is a selected author of the French drama project Instant MIX, which is supported by Creative Europe. In 2017, his play Banat was introduced at the Société des Auteurs et Compositeurs Dramatiques. In 2008, this play was translated by Chris Thorpe under the title Borderland, and in 2012, there was a German-speaking stage reading at the Leipzig Book Fair.

In 2003 Šajtinac wrote the screenplay for the short film True Story of an Umbrella, a Bicycle, a Bullet, and an Easter Bunny (Istinita priča o kišobranu, biciklu, jednom metku i uskršnjem zeki). He was its co-director and played a leading role.

== Bibliography (selection) ==
Drama

- Rekviziter (Propsmaster), premiere at Belgrade Drama Theater, 1999; English translation by Duška Radosavljević, performed at Festival Of Contemporary European Plays, Huddersfield University, 2000.
- Pravo na Rusa (Right For Russians), premiere at Serbian National Theater, 2001.

Theater play about a love affair between local farmer Maria and Alexey, Russian prisoner of war in Austro-Hungarian Banat during World War I.

- Govorite li australijski? (Do You Speak Australian?), Premiere at Todor Jovanović National Theater Zrenjanin, 2002.
- Život na pustom ostrvu (Life On Desert Island), Open-Air premiere of BELEF summer festival on Belgrade's Great War Island, 2003.
- Robinzon i pirati (Robinson and Pirates), Open-Air premiere of BELEF summer festival on Great War Island, 2004.
- Huddersfield, World Premiere at Leeds Playhouse, 2004. Translated by Duška Radosavljević.
- Huddersfield (Hadersfild), Premiere at Yugoslavian Drama Theater, 2005; performances at Betty Oliphant Theatre 2005, Slovene National Theatre Drama 2006, ZKM – Zagrebačko kazalište mladih 2007, Festival DEMOLUDY 2009, and Viennese Theater Akzent 2012.
- Banat (Banat), Premiere at Yugoslavian Drama Theater, 2007; incidental music by Isidora Žebeljan
- Vetruškina ledina (Falcon Glade), puppetry for children, adaptation by Gordana Đurđević-Dimić, Premiere at Todor Jovanović National Theater, 2008.
- Lepet mojih plućnih krila (Fluttering Of My Lungs), Premiere at National Theatre Sombor, 2009.
- 4 komada (Four Plays Anrhology containing Animals, Banat, Hadersfild, Ogigijanke), Mali Nemo, Pančevo 2014, ISBN 978-86-7972-089-4.
- Animals, Premiere at City Theater Kruševac (Kruševačko pozorište), 2018.

Prose

- Čuda prirode : prilozi za odbranu poezije (Miracles Of Nature: contributions for defensing lyrics), short stories, Književna omladina Srbije, Belgrade 1993, ISBN 86-7343-036-4.
- Čemer : libreto za krut košmar ili roman u pričama (Woe: libretto for cruel nightmare or novel in stories), novel, Jefimija, Kragujevac 1998, ISBN 86-7016-016-1.
- Nada stanuje na kraju grada (Nada Lives On The Edge Of Town), epistolary novel, Studenski kulturni centar, Belgrade 2002, ISBN 86-80957-11-9.
- Vetruškina ledina (Vetruška Glade), book for children, Studentski kulturni centar, Novi Sad 2005, ISBN 86-85983-03-7.
- Vok on! : manifest razdraganog pesimizma (Walk on!: Manifesto of happy pessimism), short stories, Narodna knjiga–Alfa, Belgrade 2007, ISBN 978-86-331-2655-7.
- Sasvim skromni darovi (Quite Modest Gifts), novel, Arhipelag, Belgrade 2011, ISBN 978-86-523-0010-5.
- Čarna i Nesvet (Crow Čarna and Dew-worm Nesvet), book for children, Pčelica, Čačak 2013, ISBN 978-86-6089-402-3.
- Banatorijum (Banatorium), short stories, Arhipelag, Belgrade 2014, ISBN 978-86-523-0122-5.
- Žena iz Huareza (Woman from Juárez), short stories, Arhipelag, Belgrade 2017, ISBN 978-86-523-0233-8.
- Banda neželjenih ljubimaca (Gang of Undesirable Pets), book for children, Pčelica izdavaštvo, Čačak 2017, ISBN 978-86-6089-724-6.
- Biće jednom (It Will Be Once), book for teenager, Pčelica, Čačak 2020, ISBN 978-86-6089-974-5.

Translations

- Three contemporary European plays (contains Propsmaster translated by Duška Radosavljević), Alumnus, Leeds 2000, ISBN 978-1-901439-02-1.
- Huddersfield (translation by Duška Radosavljević, adaptation by Chris Thorpe), Oberon, London 2004, ISBN 978-1-84002-449-4.
- Postpolityczność : antologia nowego dramatu serbskiego (contains Huddersfield), Panga Pank, Kraków 2011, ISBN 978-83-62711-02-4.
- Съвсем скромни дарове (Quite Modest Gifts), Ciela, Sofia 2013, ISBN 978-954-28-1422-1.
- 5 сербских пьес (5 Serbian Dramas; contains Huddersfield), Ostrovityanin, Saint Petersburg 2015, ISBN 978-5-98921-061-9.
- Skromni darovi (Modest Gifts), Sodobnost International, Ljubljana 2016, ISBN 978-961-6970-48-8.
- Doni modesti (Modest Gifts), Atmosphere libri, Rome 2016, ISBN 978-88-6564-186-6.
- Дуже скромні дари (Quite Modest Gifts), Tempora, Kyiv 2016, ISBN 978-617-569-276-9.
- Szerény ajándékok (Modest Gifts), Noran Libro Kiadó, Budapest 2016, ISBN 978-615-55-1376-3.
- Сосема скромни дарови (Quite Modest Gifts), Prozart media, Skopje 2016, ISBN 978-608-256-003-8.
- De très modestes cadeaux (Quite Modest Gifts), Les Éditions Bleu & Jaune, Paris 2021,ISBN 979-10-94936-12-2.

== Awards ==
- Second Award for best screenplay 2007 at Film Screenplay Festival Vrnjačka Banja (together with Dejan Nikolaj Kraljačić)
- Award for best screenplay at Prvi Filmski festival Srbije Novi Sad 2007
- Distinction of Jury for best screenplay at Film Festival Wiosna Filmów Warsaw 2008
- Sima Cucić Award 2018 for Gang of Undesirable Pets
