= Nebojša Pajkić =

Serbian screenwriter (born 1951)

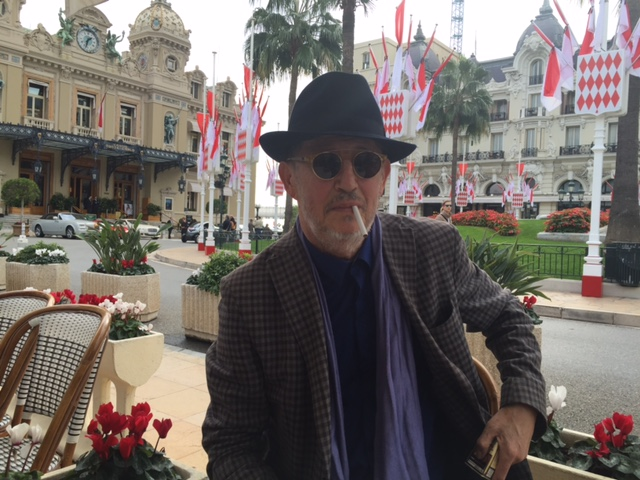
Pajkić in 2015

Nebojša Pajkić (Serbian Cyrillic: Небојша Пајкић; born 25 November 1951) is a Serbian screenwriter. He is a professor of film dramaturgy, writer, director and film critic.

== Biography ==
In 1971, Pajkić moved to Belgrade for university studies and ended up staying after graduation.

He was married to a Serbian writer Isidora Bjelica (he co-authored one of her books) whom he met when she was his student on the Belgrade's Film Academy. It is Pajkić's third marriage. He's got a son, Lav and a daughter with Bjelica and a daughter from his second marriage.

== Filmography ==
Year	Film	Credited as				
Year	Film	Director	Producer	Screenwriter	Actor	Notes
1981	The Promising Boy	No	No	Yes	Yes	Role: Police Officer
1983	Pismo - Glava	No	No	Yes	No	
1984	Strangler vs. Strangler	No	No	Yes	No	
1984	Una	No	No	Yes	No	
1985	Šest dana juna	No	No	Yes	No	
1987	Čovek u srebrnoj jakni	No	No	Yes	No	TV Miniseries, 1 episode
1987	Kraljeva završnica	No	No	Yes	No	
1988	Remington	No	No	Yes	No	
1989	The Fall of Rock and Roll	No	No	Yes	No	Story editor
1990	Do konca in naprej	No	No	Yes	No	
1990	Poslednji valcer u Sarajevu	No	No	Yes	No	Script collaborator
2000	Oštrica brijača	No	No	No	Yes	Short film
2000	Dorćol - Menhetn	No	Yes	No	No	
2015	General Mihailović: Heroj i kazna	Yes	No	No	No	American TV movie, documentary
2015	Limunovo drvo	No	No	No	Yes	Documentary, as himself
2016	Paluba ispod Terazija	No	No	No	Yes	Role: Živojin Ivanović
