= Premeditated Murder =

- Directed by: Gorčin Stojanović
- Screenplay by: Slobodan Selenić
- Based on: Ubistvo s predumišljajem by Slobodan Selenić
- Produced by: Dragan Samardžić; Ljubiša Samardžić
- Starring: Branka Katić; Nebojša Glogovac; Ana Sofrenović; Dragan Mićanović; Sergej Trifunović
- Cinematography: Radoslav Vladić
- Edited by: Petar Marković
- Music by: Zoran Erić
- Release date: 1995
- Running time: 94 min
- Language: Serbian

Premeditated Murder (Serbian: Убиство с предумишљајем, Ubistvo s predumišljajem) is a 1995 Serbian film directed by Gorčin Stojanović starring Branka Katić and Nebojša Glogovac. It is based on a novel by Slobodan Selenić.

== Cast ==
- Branka Katić - Jelena Panic (Bulika)
- Nebojša Glogovac - Bogdan Bilogorac
- Ana Sofrenović - Jelena Ljubisavljevic
- Dragan Mićanović - Jovan
- Sergej Trifunović - Krsman Jaksic
- Rade Marković - Branko Kojovic
- Ljubiša Samardžić - Vidosav
- Danilo Stojković - Stavra Arandjelovic
- Svetozar Cvetković - Debeli
- Predrag Ejdus - Doktor Cvetkovic
- Aljoša Vučković - Morozov
