= Slobodan Selenić =

Serbian writer, literary critic, dramatist, academic and university professor

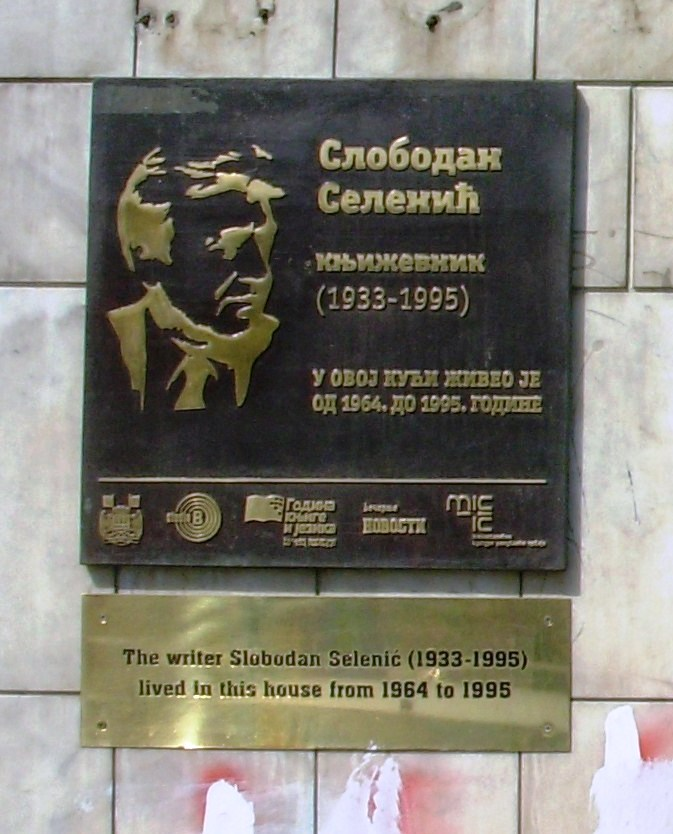
- A plaque on the house where Selenić lived
- Born: 7 June 1933; Pakrac, Kingdom of Yugoslavia
- Died: 27 October 1995 (aged 62); Belgrade, FR Yugoslavia
- Education: Faculty of Dramatic arts, University of Arts in Belgrade
- Occupations: University professor, writer
- Awards: NIN Award, Sterija Award

Slobodan Selenić (Serbian Cyrillic: Слободан Селенић; 7 June 1933 – 27 October 1995) was a Serbian writer, literary critic, dramatist, academic and university professor of 20th century literature.

== Biography ==
He graduated from the Faculty of Philosophy, University of Belgrade.

One of the main themes in his work is the destruction of the civic class from Kingdom of Yugoslavia, its values and later destruction with the formation of the second Yugoslavia. He became the director of Avala Film at the age of 29. The Slobodan Selenić Award is annually awarded in his honour for the best graduate work at his alma mater.

Selenić won the NIN literary prize in 1980 and was Belgrade's Poet Laureate.

== Works ==
His works include:

- Avangardna drama, anthology (1964)
- Angažman u dramskoj formi (1965)
- Memoari Pere Bogalja (1968)
- Dramski pravci XX vijeka (1971)
- Pismo glava (1972)
- Antologija savremene srpske drame, anthology (1977)
- Prijatelji (1980)
- Kosančićev vijenac 7 (1982)
- Očevi i oci (1985); English translation, Fathers and Forefathers, Ellen Elias-Bursac, tr. (The Harvill Press, 2003)
- Ruženje naroda (1987)
- Timor mortis (1989)
- Knez Pavle (1991)
- Ubistvo s predumišljajem, novel and screenplay for film (1993); English translation, Premeditated Murder, Jelena Petrovic, tr. (The Harvill Press, 1997)
- Iskorak u stvarnost (1995)
- Dramski pravci XX vijeka (2003)
- Malajsko ludilo (2003)
- Dramsko doba (2005)

Preceded by Ciril Zlobec until 1986; 1986-1988 vacant	President of the Association of Writers of Yugoslavia; 1988-1990	Succeeded by Ottó Tolnai
