= Dimitrije Bjelica =

Serbian chess player (1935–2025)

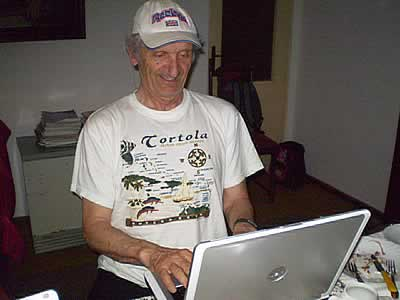

Personal information
- Born: 8 November 1935
- Died: 18 June 2025 (aged 89)

Chess career
- Country: Serbia
- Title: FIDE Master (1983)
- Peak rating: 2390 (January 1976)

Dimitrije Bjelica (Serbian: Димитрије Бјелица; 8 November 1935 – 18 June 2025) was a Yugoslav and Serbian chess FIDE Master. He organised many big events and was the arbiter at tournaments like Linares.

Bjelica claimed to have played a record-breaking 56 games of blindfold chess in a 25 May 1997 simultaneous exhibition (+51 −1 =4) at Igalo, near Herceg Novi. However, Eliot Hearst and John Knott write:

The Exhibition was played at the International Congress of Nurses and his opponents were all woman nurses. The game he lost was to his mother, at that time more than 80 years old. ... Bjelica reports that the exhibition lasted seven hours and that in several games his version of chess, Chess for Peace, was used, in which the bishops standing initially on f1 and f8 were replaced by pawns. He told us that none of his opponents had chess ratings but "some of them were very good." ... Tellingly and surprisingly, he admitted that he was permitted to write down whatever he liked during the exhibition ... .

Bjelica befriended Bobby Fischer during the 1958 Portorož Interzonal Tournament. Fischer and Bjelica collaborated on the book Chess Meets of the Century. The majority of the book was written by Bjelica, with Fischer providing brief notes on his games. Fischer and Bjelica also recorded a television series, with Fischer explaining the games of great grandmasters. In 1973, the Croatian Supreme Court ordered Bjelica to pay 5,000 dinars (~$360) to Fischer as compensation for a series of articles called "My Life", which were written by Bjelica, but which he attributed to Fischer. Bjelica had written in November 1970 that he just rewrote his interviews of Fischer which were published in his book Grand masters in profile, and that he omitted the questions, only publishing Fischer's answers.

Bjelica wrote numerous books and articles on chess and interviewed many leading players. Chess historian Edward Winter has noted that Bjelica's books are rife with misspellings and sometimes contain plagiarized material.

Bjelica died on 18 June 2025, at the age of 89.

== Books ==
- Reyes del Ajedrez ISBN 84-88155-32-8
