= Cinema of Serbia =

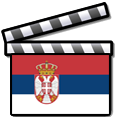
- No. of screens: 117 (2011)
  - Per capita: 1.3 per 100,000 (2011)
- Main distributors: Tuck Vision 35.3% Filmstar 29.3% Paramount 24.5%

Produced feature films (2016)
- Fictional: 20

Number of admissions (2018)
- Total: 4,193,755

Gross box office (2011)
- Total: RSD 739 million
- National films: RSD 239 million (32.3%)

The Cinema of Serbia refers to the film industry and films made in Serbia or by Serbian filmmakers.

Serbia (both as an independent state and as part of Yugoslavia) has been home to many internationally acclaimed films and directors. Many of the prominent films from the Balkans are from Serbia, and have enjoyed great commercial success.

== History of cinema ==
=== Kingdom of Serbia (1896–1917) ===
André Carr, a representative of the Lumière brothers, was the first to project a motion picture in the Balkans and Central Europe in Belgrade on 6 June 1896. He shot the first motion pictures of Belgrade the following year, but they have not been preserved.

Serbian cinema dates back to 1911 with the release of the oldest movie in the Balkans, The Life and Deeds of the Immortal Vožd Karađorđe, a biography about Serbian revolutionary leader, Karađorđe. A number of traveling cinemas moved through Serbia, showing films in rented halls or in tents. Stojan Nanić from Zaječar was the owner of The First Serbian Cinema company. He began screening films in the capital and other cities in 1900. During the early twentieth century, cinema became increasingly popular in Serbia. The first permanent cinema was opened in Belgrade in 1909; more cinemas opened shortly thereafter across the country. Modern-day Vojvodina province was part of Austria-Hungary. Cinema developed in the province at the same time as it did in Serbia, with the first cinema being opened in Sombor in 1906.

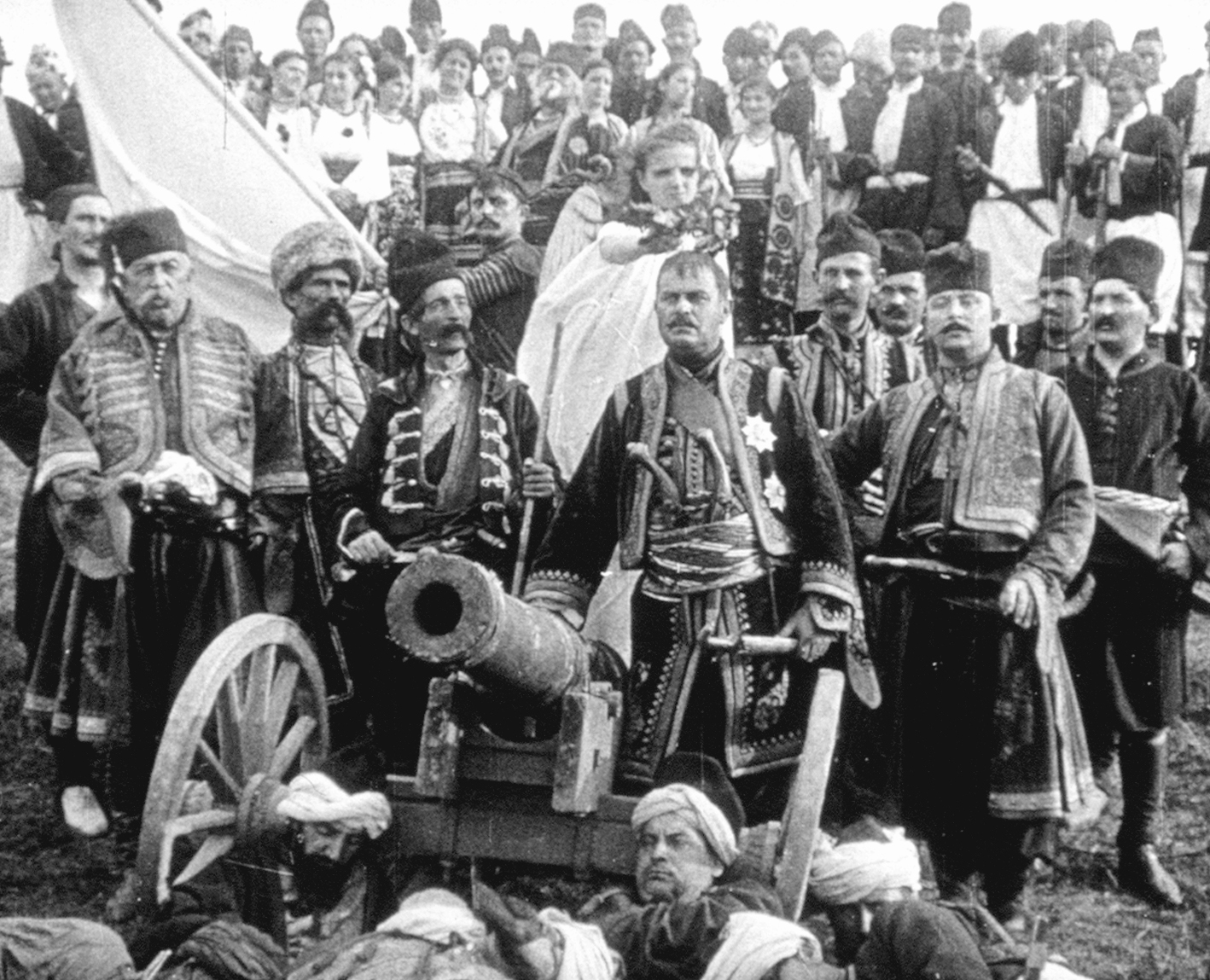
A still from The Life and Deeds of the Immortal Leader Karađorđe, the first feature film released in the Balkans

Owners of pubs rented space for traveling cinema operators from abroad and soon began producing their own productions. Serbian cinema pioneers include Svetozar Botorić, the Savić brothers, the Cvetković brothers and Đoka Bogdanović. Botorić owned the cinema named Paris in the center of Belgrade. He hired camera operators from France and produced around 20 short documentaries. He went on to make films during the Balkan wars. Other notable films from this period include The Coronation of King Peter I shot in 1904.

By the beginning of the World War I, there were 30 established cinemas active in the Kingdom of Serbia. After the Great Retreat, the Serbian army founded a film section on Corfu which documented various battles and events during the war.

=== Kingdom of Yugoslavia (1918–1941) ===
Cinema was established reasonably early in Serbia with 12 films having been produced before the start of World War II. Ernest Bošnjak was a notable filmmaker from Sombor, who directed and produced several well-received genre films and documentaries. Other film pioneers from Vojvodina are Aleksandar Lifka and Vladimir Totović. Stanislav Krakov was a notable documentary filmmaker and writer. His movie Golgota Srbije (1930) is notable for its depiction of the interwar period.

In 1931, the government introduced a new state law covering cinema, which promoted the rise of domestic production. Prior to that, most local production companies went bankrupt, because of high taxes, a lack of state policy protecting domestic companies, and the attractive offer of cheap foreign-produced films on the market for screening (mostly French, German and American). In 1932 there were more movies produced than in the whole period between 1918 and 1931. Through lobbying by foreign companies the law which favoured and protected domestic cinema was withdrawn and local production was reduced to its prior state with only a few movies produced.

Serbian poet Stanislav Vinaver and Boško Tokin were the pioneers of film criticism and film theory in the country.

Notable films from this period include Sve radi osmeha, Rudareva sreća, Kralj Čarlstona, Grešnica bez greha and Kroz buru i oganj. The most notable of the prewar films is Mihailo Popović's The Battle of Kosovo from 1939, while the best documentary is considered to be Priča jednog dana by Maks Kalmić.

=== Republic of Yugoslavia (1945—1992) ===
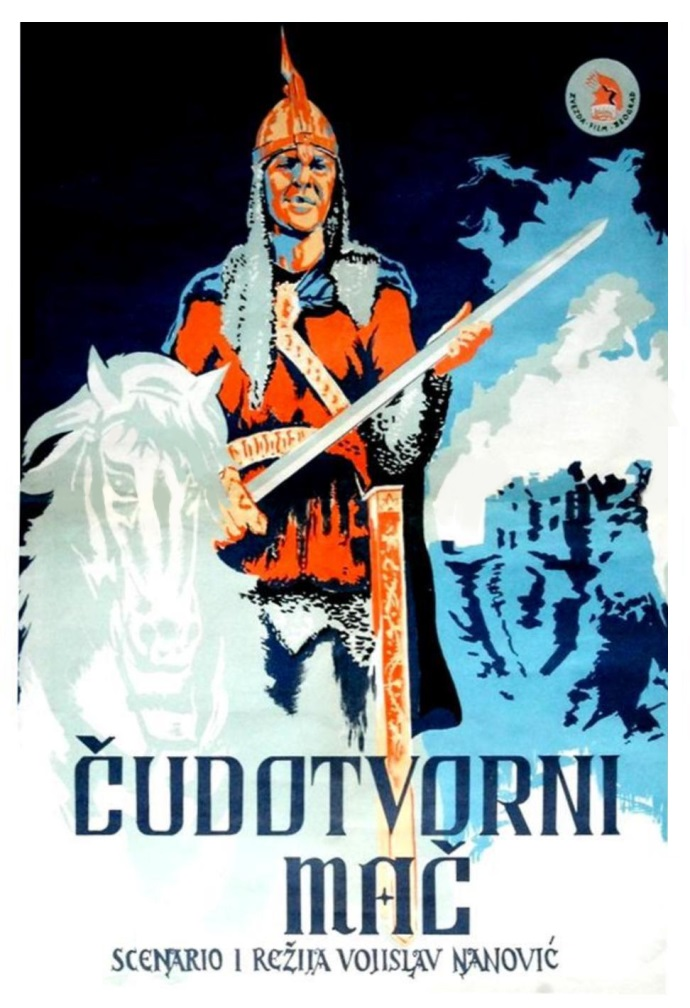
Poster for The Magic Sword (1950), adventure/fantasy movie which was based on the Serbian fairy tale The Nine Peahens and the Golden Apples

==== After World War II ====
After the victory of the Yugoslav Partisans, the newly founded state formed the Federal Committee for Cinematography, which was organized into six regional centers, one for each socialist republic. The Faculty of Dramatic Arts (under the name Academy for Theatre Arts) was founded as the main educational institution for education in the country. A new studio complex known as Film City in Košutnjak was built and several monthly film magazines were started.

Most films produced after World War II were action films, adventures, partisan films, adaptations, historical dramas, documentaries and film news (chronicles of everyday life).

==== Partisan films ====
Partisan films (sr. Партизански филм) appeared immediately after World War II, with Slavica (1947) being the first. Partisan film is a subgenre of war films, set in Nazi-occupied Yugoslavia, with the partisan army of Yugoslavia as protagonists, and the armies of Axis powers as antagonists. These films are often characterized as having the production scale of epic films, with an ensemble cast and emotionally intense scenes, caused solely by the tragedies of war. According to some film historians, partisan films respected Tito's cult of personality and rarely glorified individuals over the collective, focusing less on actors. However, for her role as a partisan doctor in I Was Stronger (1953) Mira Stupica won a Golden Arena for Best Actress.

In the 40s and 50s director Radoš Novaković achieved great success with several partisan features: Dečak Mita (1951), The Sun Is Far Away (1953), based on the eponymous novel by Dobrica Ćosić, Blodveien (1955), a Yugoslavian—Norwegian production and Vetar je stao pred zoru (1959). Other partisan films of the 40s and 50s are: Besmrtna mladost (1948), Barba Žvane (1949), Poslednji dan (1951), The Last Bridge (1954), filmed in collaboration with East Germany, Jedini izlaz (1958), The Sky Through the Trees (1958), Rafal u nebo (1958) and Aleksa Dundić (1959), Yugoslavian–Russian film.

Most of the first film stars in Yugoslavia were cast in partisan films, including: Ljuba Tadić, Rade Marković, Dragomir Felba, Pavle Vuisić, Marija Crnobori, Mihajlo Bata Paskaljević, Dara Čalenić, Rahela Ferari, Severin Bijelić, Stole Aranđelović, Branko Pleša and Milena Dravić.

In the 1960s, film production in Yugoslavia was growing, as many features were sponsored directly by the state. Captain Lechi (1961) was the highest grossing Yugoslav movie at the time. It was directed by Žika Mitrović, who directed another commercially successful film, March on the Drina, in 1964. Writers and poets from the entire country were hired to write screenplays for partisan films. Arsen Diklić penned March on the Drina and Destination Death in 1964, while Antonije Isaković wrote Partisan Stories (1960). Velimir Bata Živojinović rose to fame as one of the most recognizable faces of partisan films. In the 1960s he played in Brat doktora Homera (1968) and Bloody Tale (1969), a film based on the song of the same name by the celebrated Yugoslav poet Desanka Maksimović. Živojinović played in partisan Bosnian and Croatian productions, Kozara and Thundering Mountains (1963) which helped him gain popularity across the country. However, he also played in Black Wave films. Young Ljubiša Samardžić (Desant na Drvar, Kozara, Eagles Fly Early) was another actor often seen as a protagonist in Yugoslav war films.

The 1969 film Battle of Neretva featured the most prominent Yugoslav actors, such as Živojinović, Samardžić, Dravić and Vuisić, but also international film stars, including Yul Brynner, Orson Welles, Franco Nero and Sergei Bondarchuk. Production was lavishly financed by President Tito himself, who also served as a consultant. It was considered one of the most expensive films at the time, designed to represent Yugoslavia as a friendly communist country. Pablo Picasso drew the film's poster. Battle of Neretva was nominated for the Oscar for Best Foreign Film in April 1970, but lost to the Algerian film Z.

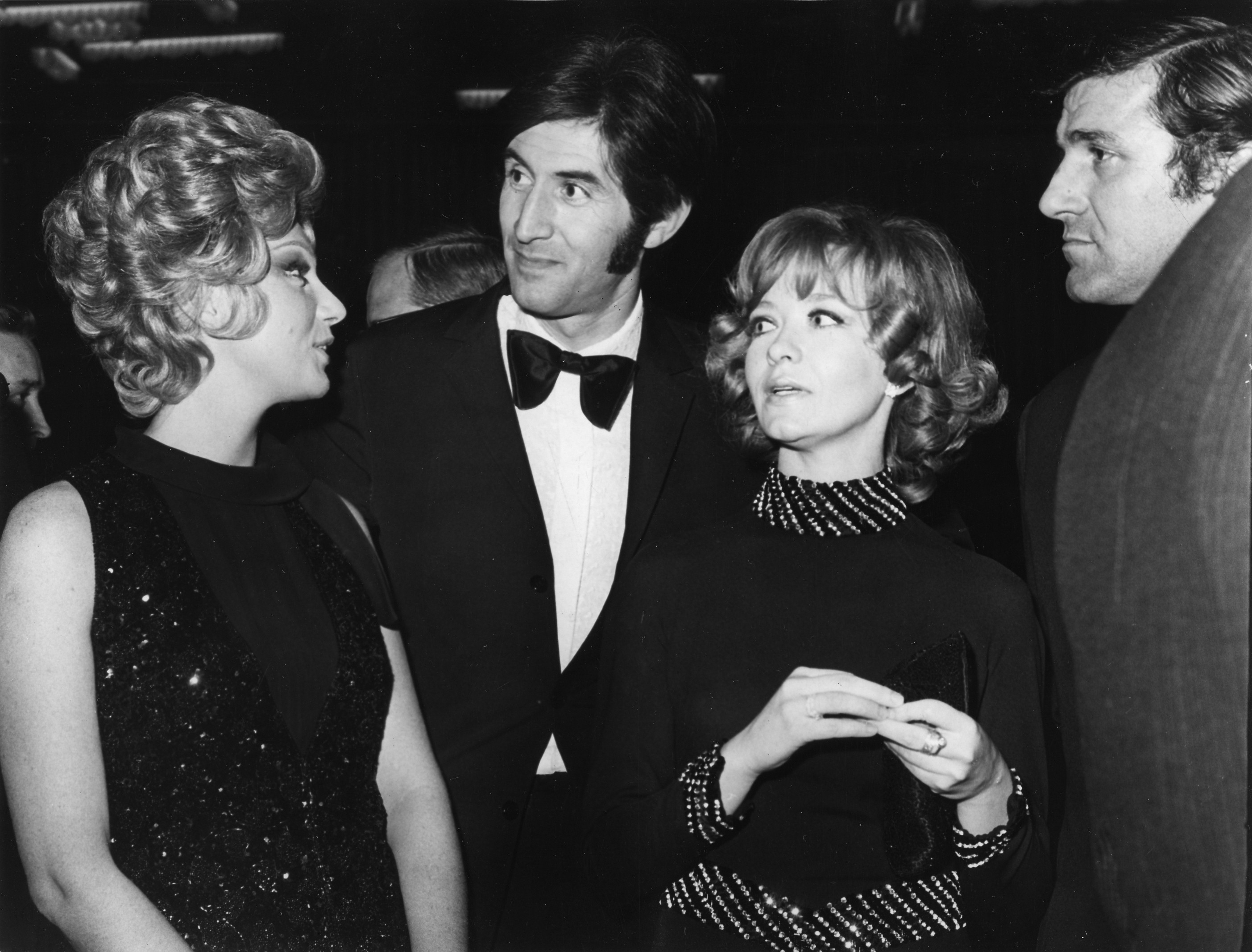
Milena Dravic in the middle, with Samardžić on her right and Živojinović on her left at the premiere of Battle of Neretva (1969)

The success of partisan films continued long after Battle of Neretva. The decade began with The Cyclists (1970) by Mladomir Puriša Đorđević and Hajka (1972) with Rade Šerbedžija in the leading role. For this film, Pavle Vuisić was awarded the Golden Arena. In 1972 Bata Živojinović played the role of his life in Valter Defends Sarajevo. Three years later the film was shown on Chinese national television, making Živojinović a film star in China. In 1973, two films were made that performed very well at the box office. The first was Bombardiers (with Živojinović and Samardžić), and the second Battle of Sutjeska. Aiming to repeat the success of Battle of Neretva, this film gathered a popular cast—Dravić, Samardžić and Živojinović. This was another film with a budget approved by Tito, so many international actors were cast. Richard Burton played Josip Broz Tito and Orson Welles had the role of Winston Churchill. 1974 marked the last peak of partisan film with two blockbusters: The Written-Off with Voja Brajović and Dragan Nikolić and Guns of War, which brought another Golden Arena to Ružica Sokić. That same year Written-Off was turned into a television series. In 1974, the big-budget film Hell River with Rod Taylor was screened with moderate success. This was also the case with Doctor Mladen (1975), The Peaks of Zelengora (1976), Maiden Bridge (1976), Dvoboj za južnu prugu (1978) and Arrive Before Daybreak (1978), the exception being Boško Buha, a film adaptation of eponymous novel by Dobrica Ćosić. After Tito's death in 1980, production of partisan films began to collapse following their slow fusion with war and post-war drama. In 1980, no partisan film was made. Partisan films that came after, now considered war dramas, were March on Igman, Široko lišće and Great Transport, which received universally negative criticism, bombed at the box office and symbolically marked the end of the era of the partisan film. The theme of German occupation of Yugoslavia, however, continued in the cinema of Serbia into the 80s, mostly in the war comedy genre, with movies such as Who's Singin' Over There? and Balkan Express. Many prominent Serbian actors began their careers in partisan film. The Farm in the Small Marsh (1976) featured child actor Slavko Štimac, who remained famous years later. Acclaimed director, actor and producer, Dragan Bjelogrlić, played his first role in Boško Buha (1978).

==== Cinema in the 1960s ====
By the early 60s, Yugoslav movies had an already established ensemble of notable actors. Led by the country's most beloved on-screen duo, Milena Dravić and Ljubiša Samardžić, who played a film couple 25 times, those actors included: Olivera Marković, Velimir Bata Živojinović, Ružica Sokić, Miodrag Petrović Čkalja, Beba Lončar, Stevo Žigon, Vlastimir Đuza Stojiljković and others. Despite the popularity of partisan films and the birth of Black Wave, overproduction in the film industry also created space for other genres. In the 60s, Yugoslavia saw the rise of comedy films.

Two actors who made the genre popular were Mija Aleksić and Miodrag Petrović Čkalja. Petrović rose to fame with the 1964 comedy A Trip Around the World (1964) directed by Soja Jovanović and based on the work of Branislav Nušić. In the film he plays the role of Jovanča Micić, a merchant from Jagodina, who ends up on an adventurous road trip around the world. This movie also launched the career of Olivera Katarina, a Serbian singer and actress. Soja Jovanović and Čkalja had more successful collaborations in the sixties—the partisan film Eagles Fly Early (1966), based on the eponymous novel by Branko Ćopić and Father by Force (1969). Mija Aleksić also starred in films directed by Jovanović and won a Golden Arena for Best Actor for her comedy Dr (1962). He also played in the successful Black Wave film Čovek iz hrastove šume (1964), though he was best known for his roles in the Yugoslavian blockbuster Ljubav i moda (1960) and the 1967 comedy Bokseri idu u raj. Ljubav i moda featured guest music star Gabi Novak, and today is best remembered for the 1960s hit song Devojko mala (pesmo moga grada).

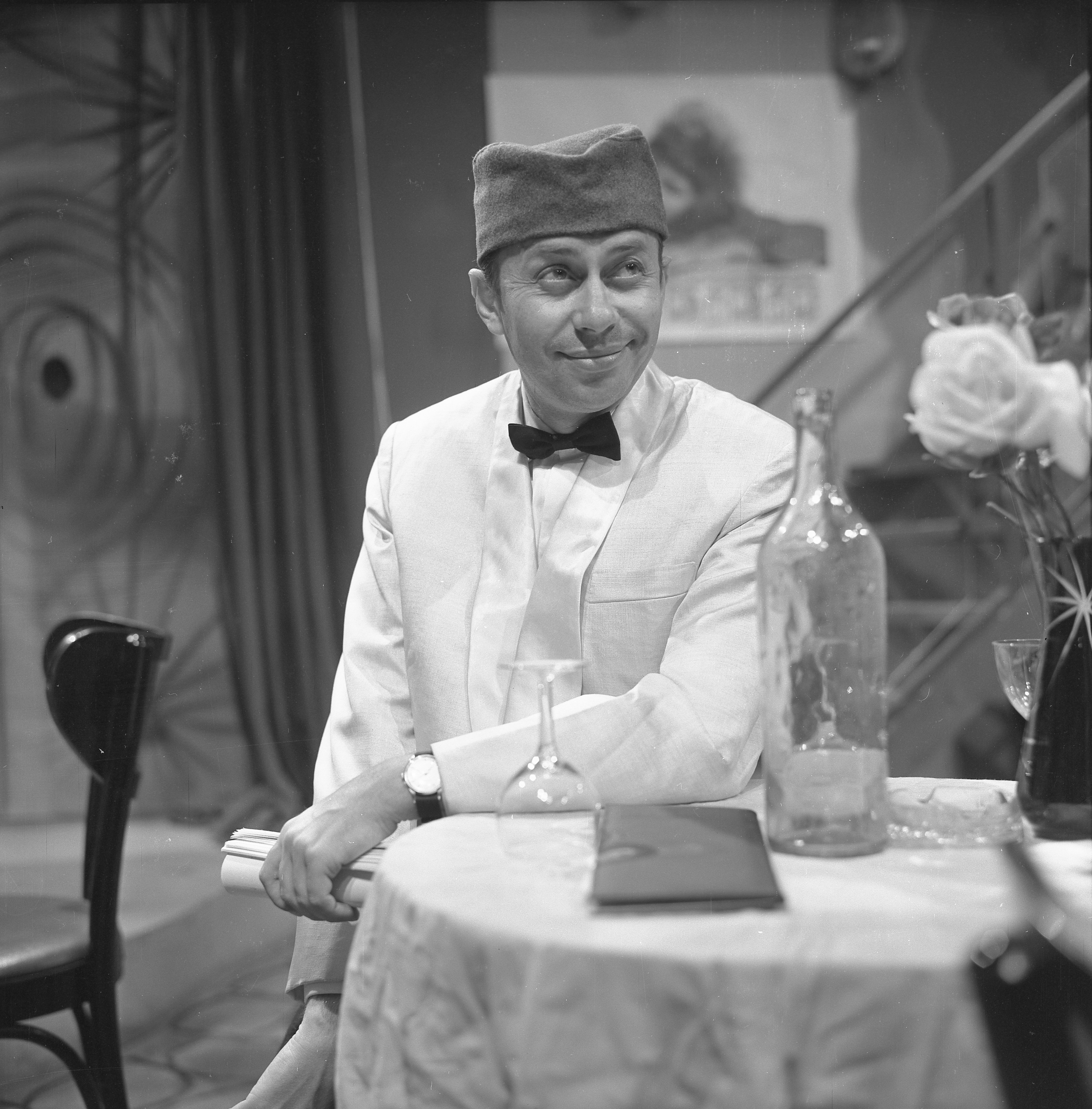
Miodrag Petrović Čkalja in 1963.

Other famous movies were mostly comedies: The Dreams Came by Coach (1960, orig. Diližansa snova), Prvi građanin male varoši (1961), Nema malih bogova (1961), Lito vilovito (1964), Sirota Marija (1968), Bog je umro uzalud (1969), as well as dramas Zemljaci (1963), The Climber (1966) and Hassan-aga's Wife (1967) with Milena Dravić, who in the sixties was awarded three supporting and a Golden Arena for Best Actress in the comedy Prekobrojna (1962). Two notable mentions are the musical Zvižduk u osam (1962) with Đorđe Marjanović and a thriller The Knife (1967) with Bata Živojinović. In 1967 and 1968 three romance films introduced Neda Arnerić, the youngest star and the future sex–symbol of Yugoslavia. Those films were The Morning, Noon and The Girl in the Park. At the Venice Film Festival, Ljubiša Samardžić won a Volpi Cup for Best Actor for his role in Jutro, (now considered a Black Wave film), while Milena Dravić, who played his partner, got a special award from the jury.

Other Yugoslav actors who began their careers in the 60s' film are Danilo Bata Stojković, Mira Banjac, Petar Kralj, Bora Todorović, Mihailo Janketić, Vera Čukić and Jelena Žigon among others. Between 1960 and 1970, young actor Nikola Simić played in 44 films. This was also the time when comedians Seka Sablić and Zoran Radmilović had their first on-screen roles.

==== Black Wave ====
In the early 1960s, Yugoslav cinema was going through a period of mass production. More fresh faces in film making meant more topics could be tackled. A number of directors particularly wanted to show the darker sides of the communist state, the malfunctions of society and to explore the subjects of the human body and sexuality. Their projects created the so called Black Wave in Yugoslav cinema, a period of non-traditional filmmaking between 1963 and 1972. The name Black wave comes from a polemical article "Crni talas u našem filmu" ("Black wave in our Cinematography"). While directors were banned and forced into exile, their movies were getting international recognition. Some of their works were confiscated by the Yugoslav government.

The leading filmmakers of Black Wave were Žika Pavlović (When I Am Dead and Gone, The Rats Woke Up), Saša Petrović (It Rains in My Village, Tri), Puriša Đorđević (Devojka, San, Jutro, Podne), Mika Antić and Mića Popović (Burduš). However, Dušan Makavejev (Innocence Unprotected, Man Is Not a Bird) and Želimir Žilnik (Early Works, The Way Steel Was Tempered, Marble Ass). Their films went on to win a Golden Bear, Silver Bear for Best Director, Cannes Grand Prix and six nominations for Cannes Palme d'Or. This success continued with directors emerging from the wave, earning two Palme d'Or awards in the 1980s and 1990s.

Two Black Wave films, both made by Aleksandar Saša Petrović, were nominated for the Academy Award for Best Foreign Language Film: Three in 1966 and I Even Met Happy Gypsies with Olivera Katarina and Bekim Fehmiu in 1967.

The most notable postwar director was Dušan Makavejev, who was internationally recognized for Love Affair: Or the Case of the Missing Switchboard Operator in 1969 focusing on Yugoslav politics. His other acclaimed work is W.R.: Mysteries of the Organism (1971) after which he was accused of deriding the institutions of the state and was forced into exile.

These films had an almost regular cast. Milena Dravić was celebrated as an icon of the Black Wave and went on to become the ″Leading Lady of Yugoslav Cinema″. Eva Ras became famous thanks to being in the first scene of female nudity in Serbian film, and after publicly refusing to join Tito at his villa on the Brioni Islands. Ružica Sokić was another actress who became popular because of her roles in Black Wave films and remained famous until her death. Some films considered to be influenced by the Black Wave are Strange girl (1962), Plastic Jesus (1971), I Bog stvori kafansku pevačicu (1972) with Bata Živojinović and The Yellow One (1973) featuring Ružica Sokić in the title role, for which she was awarded with Golden Arena for Best Actress.

==== Cinema in the 1970s ====
Other than partisan and Black Wave films, few films featuring different topics were shown in the cinemas in Yugoslavia in the 1970s. 1973, however, marked the birth of horror as a genre in Serbian film. The movie was The She-Butterfly by Đorđe Kadijević, with its plot centered around the story of a female vampire haunting the peasants coming to the local mill. The film was based on the Milovan Glišić short story After Ninety Years (1880). It was originally made for television, but due to its popularity it has been screened in cinemas to this day.

1977 was particularly successful. Ljubiša Samardžić won Golden Arena for Best Actor for his role in Special Education, the directorial debut of Goran Marković, who became a celebrated director. This movie was also marked the beginning of the careers of two other actors who later became famous—Aleksandar Berček and Branislav Lečić. In the same year, Serbian actress Svetlana Bojković won a Golden Arena for Best Actress for her role in The Dog Who Loved Trains. This was the second successful film directed by Goran Paskaljević, the first being Beach Guard in Winter in 1976, with Mira Banjac and Danilo Bata Stojković. Both of his films were screened at the Berlin International Film Festival. Fragrance of Wild Flowers, a film by Srđan Karanović, also premiered in 1977 in Belgrade. It was screened at the Cannes Film Festival, where it won FIPRESCI award. At the Pula Film Festival, it won the Big Golden Arena for Best Film.

Among notable comedy films was Foolish Years (1977)—the first installment of the 10 part comedy serial Žika's Dynasty, starring Dragomir Gidra Bojanić. Bojanić is mostly remembered for his character Grandpa Žika in the serial. Despite the universally negative criticism of its folksy humor, the film series enjoyed massive popularity in Yugoslavia. Romantic comedies were in high demand, and many were made in the seventies, most of them featuring Ljubiša Samardžić. The best known among them were Beloved Love (1977) (or Love Life of Budimir Trajković) and Naivko (1975), where he played the love interest of Radmila Živković.

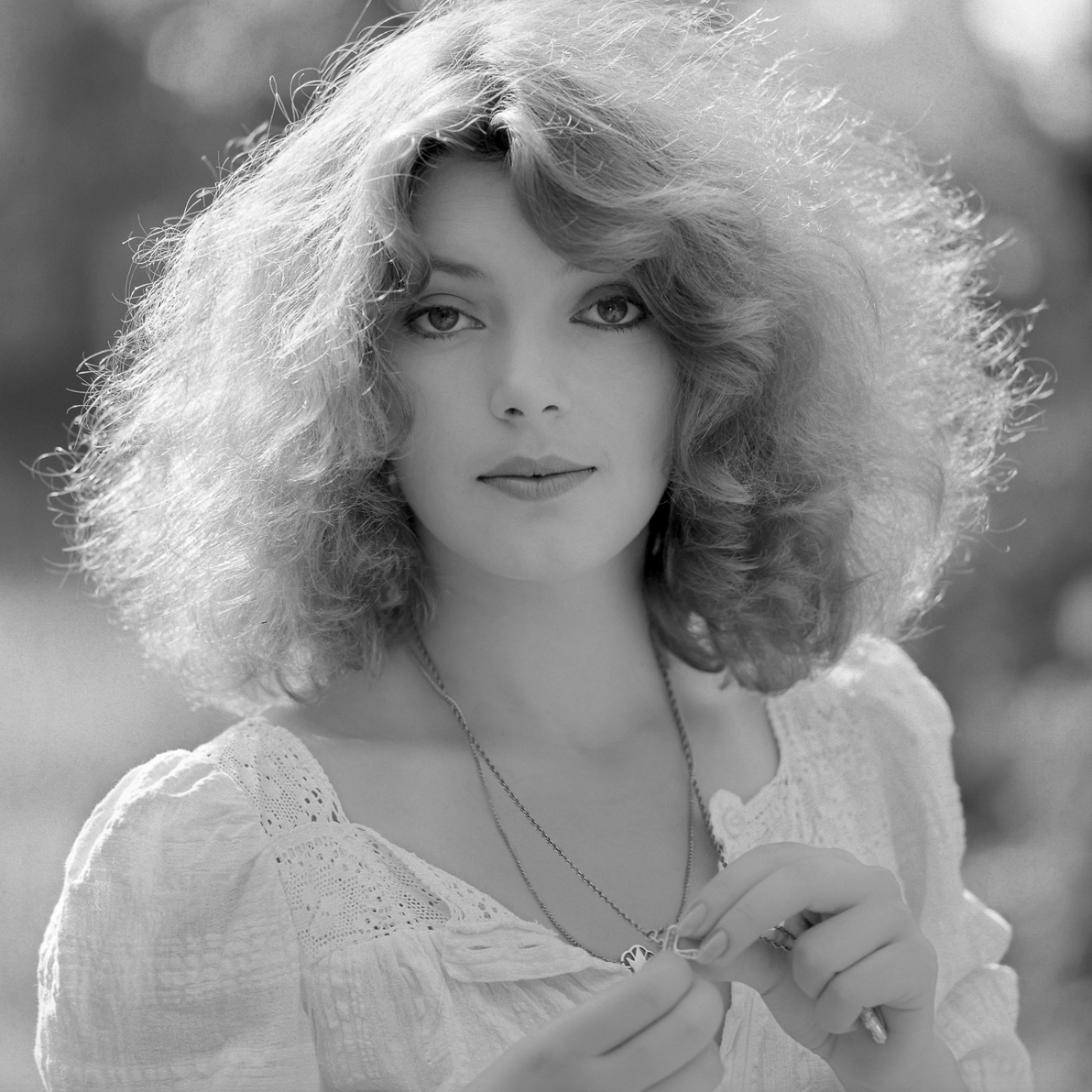
Photo taken at the unsuccessful audition of Tanja Bošković for the leading role in Naivko (1975)

Other notable films include The Bug Killer (orig. Bubašinter) (1971), Paja i Jare (1973), based on the TV series Truckers, Košava (1974) with Tanja Bošković and Death and the Dervish (1974), based on the novel by Meša Selimović. National Class Category Up to 785 ccm from 1979 featured a popular soundtrack, with the likes of Oliver Mandić, Slađana Milošević and many other pop stars of 70s. After playing the lead in the film, Dragan Nikolić became a male sex symbol in Yugoslavia. Gorica Popović, who played the lead female role, was awarded a Golden Arena.

==== Cinema in the 1980s ====
The Belgrade school, associated with the production company Dunav Film, was among the most important schools or centers of documentary film production. Members of the film school have won numerous awards at domestic and foreign film festivals.

Several notable comedies were produced in the 1980s, including Who's Singin' Over There?, Balkan Express, The Marathon Family and Balkan Spy.

==== Cinema in the 1990s and early 2000s ====
Bosnian Serb Emir Kusturica dominated the film world at the time the Yugoslav state collapsed. His movie Underground went on to win a Palme d'Or, along with a number of other awards. The main topic of the movie is sadness for lost national and artistic unity. Kusturica's movies from the 00s Black Cat, White Cat and Život je čudo received mixed reviews.

Serbian-born film director and university professor Stefan Arsenijević won the Golden Berlin Bear for his short movie (A) Torzija in 2003.

Pavle Vučković won first prize from the Cinefondation at the Cannes Film Festival in 2003 for his short Run Rabbit Run, and in 2007 he won third prize in the same category for Minus.

=== Republic of Serbia (2006—present) ===
After the process of privatization of the state-run Beograd Film cinema chain, Belgrade was left without most of its cinemas. There were 679 cinemas in Serbia in 1968, but only 88 by 2012. In 2007, Serbian businessman, Nikola Đivanović, purchased 14 theatres, including Zvezda (Star), which belonged to Beograd Film. Within a year they were all closed; six were sold to foreign investors. On 21 November 2014 a group of 200 people, members of the public, activists, artists and filmmakers took possession of the abandoned Zverda cinema. It was later renamed the Novi Bioskop Zvezda (New Star Cinema). Several influential people outside Serbia such as Michel Gondry, who has produced a short animated film on the subject, have publicly supported the occupation. A documentary film (Occupied Cinema) shot during the occupation and directed by Senka Domanović was released in 2018.

US blockbusters and films produced by major studios dominate the repertoires of Serbian cinemas, especially multiplexes that have recently appeared in big cities.

Films by Srdan Golubović (Circles, Klopka) deal with the consequences of war and post-war society, and have won numerous international awards.

The Other Side of Everything directed by Mila Turajlić won the main award at International Documentary Film Festival Amsterdam in 2017.

Only two Serbian animated feature films were produced in this period: Noir by Srđa Penezić and Rista Topalksi, and Edit i Ja by Aleksa Gajić.

Year	Number of movies produced
2006	12
2007	16
2008	9
2009	20
2010	13
2011	12
2012	13
2013	9
2014	18
2015	19
2016	20
2017	15

== Festivals and awards ==
FEST was started in 1971 and has become one of the biggest film festivals in Serbia and the region. The festival's main award is the "Beogradski Pobednik", awarded for the best film.

The Belgrade Documentary and Short Film Festival founded in 1954 remains one of the main festivals for short, experimental and documentary movies.

The Küstendorf Film and Music Festival is an annual event held during early January in the village of Drvengrad, which was built for the purposes of shooting Life Is a Miracle.

Other popular festivals include BELDOCS - International Documentary Film Festival Belgrade, the Auteur Film Festival, the European Feature Documentary Film Festival Magnificent Seven, the International Film Directors' Festival LIFFE in Leskovac and the Palić European Film Festival.

== Notable people ==
=== Actors ===
Some of the most notable Serbian actors:

- Mija Aleksić
- Slobodan Aligrudić
- Rade Šerbedžija
- Neda Arnerić
- Mira Banjac
- Predrag Bjelac
- Dragan Bjelogrlić
- Žarko Laušević
- Petar Božović
- Predrag Miletić
- Vojislav Brajović
- Zoran Cvijanović
- Bogdan Diklić
- Anica Dobra
- Milena Dravić
- Sergej Trifunović
- Predrag Ejdus
- Taško Načić
- Bekim Fehmiu
- Mirjana Karanović
- Branka Katić
- Nikola Kojo
- Branislav Lečić
- Miki Manojlović
- Dragan Mićanović
- Dragan Nikolić
- Miodrag Petrović Čkalja
- Predrag Laković
- Dragan Maksimović
- Zoran Radmilović
- Lazar Ristovski
- Olivera Marković
- Rade Marković
- Jelisaveta Seka Sablić
- Mirjana Joković
- Ljubiša Samardžić
- Danilo Stojković
- Mira Stupica
- Nataša Šolak
- Slavko Štimac
- Sonja Savić
- Ljuba Tadić
- Bora Todorović
- Vesna Trivalić
- Srđan Todorović
- Pavle Vujisić
- Bata Živojinović
- Dragan Jovanović
- Slobodan Beštić
- Stevo Žigon
- Petar Kralj
- Danilo Lazović
- Milorad Mandić
- Svetozar Cvetković
- Tanja Bošković
- Jasna Đuričić
- Boris Komnenić
- Nenad Jezdić
- Ljubomir Bandović
- Milan Gutović
- Aleksandar Berček
- Nebojša Glogovac
- Nataša Ninković
- Dubravka Mijatović
- Miodrag Krivokapić
- Nikola Đuričko
- Nikola Pejaković
- Gorica Popović
- Gordan Kičić
- Vojin Ćetković
- Nebojša Dugalić
- Stefan Kapičić
- Miloš Timotijević
- Nikola Rakočević
- Vuk Kostić
- Miloš Biković

=== Directors ===
Serbian cinema continued to make progress in the 1990s and today despite the turmoil of the 1990s. Emir Kusturica won two Golden Palms for Best Feature Film at the Cannes Film Festival, for When Father Was Away on Business in 1985 and then again for Underground in 1995. In 1998, Kusturica won a Silver Lion for directing Black Cat, White Cat.

- Timothy John Byford
- Srđan Dragojević
- Emir Kusturica
- Peter Bogdanovich
- Dušan Makavejev
- Goran Marković
- Gojko Mitić
- Goran Paskaljević
- Živojin Pavlović
- Aleksandar Petrović
- Lazar Ristovski
- Slobodan Šijan
- Želimir Žilnik
- Boro Drašković
- Žika Mitrović
- Ljubiša Samardžić
- Nikola Ležaić
- Srdan Golubović
- Mila Turajlić
- Stefan Arsenijević

=== Diaspora ===
Several Serbian-American filmmakers have established a loose, intellectual multi-media making tradition, working within prominent academic institutions and creating works marked by high stylistic experimentation. Slavko Vorkapic, created a famed montage of sequences for Hollywood films and was the dean of the USC Film School, while film and TV director Vlada Petrić cofounded the Harvard Film Archive.

Serbian-American Academy-award winners include Karl Malden, Steve Tesich and Peter Bogdanovich. Serbian-born Darko Tresnjak won the Tony Award and Marina Zenovich won two Emmy Awards.

Notable actors of Serb origin include Iván Petrovich, Brad Dexter, Lolita Davidovich, Branko Tomovic, Rada Rassimov, Nadja Regin, Rade Šerbedžija, Milla Jovovich, Sasha Alexander and Stana Katic.

== Notable films ==
Title	Translation	Year	Genre
Marš na Drinu	March on the Drina	1964	War, Partisan
Skupljači perja	I Even Met Happy Gypsies	1967	Drama
Kada budem mrtav i beo	When I Am Dead and Gone	1967	Music, Drama
Buđenje pacova	The Rats Woke Up	1967	Drama
Bitka na Neretvi	Battle of Neretva	1969	War, Partisan
W.R.: Misterije organizma	W.R.: Mysteries of the Organism	1971	Comedy, Drama, Fantasy
Valter brani Sarajevo	Valter Defends Sarajevo	1972	War, Partisan
Leptirica	The She–Butterfly	1973	Horror
Nacionalna klasa	National Class	1979	Comedy, Drama
Ko to tamo peva	Who's That Singing Over There	1980	Comedy, Drama
Maratonci trče počasni krug	Maratonci trče počasni krug	1982	Comedy, Drama
Varljivo leto '68	The Elusive Summer of '68	1984	Comedy, Coming of age
Balkanski špijun	Balkan Spy	1984	Comedy, Drama
Otac na službenom putu	When Father Was Away on Business	1985	Drama, Comedy
Dom za vešanje	Time of the Gypsies	1988	Comedy, Crime
Tito i ja	Tito and Me	1992	Comedy, Drama
Mi nismo anđeli	We Are Not Angels	1992	Comedy
Podzemlje	Underground	1995	Comedy, Drama, War
Lepa sela, lepo gore	Pretty Village, Pretty Flame	1996	Comedy, Drama, War
Crna mačka, beli mačor	Black cat, white cat	1997	Comedy, Drama
Rane	The Wounds	1998	Drama, Crime
Mrtav ladan	Frozen Stiff	2002	Comedy, Drama
Zona Zamfirova	Zona Zamfirova	2002	Comedy, Drama
Život je čudo	Life is a miracle	2004	Comedy, Romance
Klopka	Klopka	2007	Psychological thriller
Technotise: Edit i Ja	Technotise: Edit & I	2009	Animation, Sci-Fi
Sveti Georgije ubiva aždahu	St. George Slays the Dragon	2009	Drama, History
Srpski film	A Serbian Film	2010	Thriller, Horror
Južni vetar	South wind	2018	Crime

== See also ==
- List of Serbian films
- Cinema of Yugoslavia
- World cinema
- Film festival of Serbia
- Serbia Film Commission

== Sources ==
- Goulding, Daniel J. (2002) [1985]. Liberated Cinema: The Yugoslav Experience, 1945-2001 (2nd ed.). Indiana University Press. ISBN 9780253215826.
- Cook, David (2007). A History of Narrative Film. Clio.
- Parkinson, David (2014). Istorija filma. Dereta.
