= The Knife (1967 film) =

- Serbian: Nož
- Directed by: Žika Mitrović
- Written by: Žika Mitrović
- Produced by: Boško Mitrović
- Starring: Bata Živojinović; Ljubiša Samardžić; Vera Čukić; Rade Marković; Mija Aleksić; Zafir Hadžimanov
- Cinematography: Branko Ivatović
- Edited by: Katarina Stojanović
- Music by: Miljenko Prohaska
- Production company: FRZ Belgrade
- Release date: 10 April 1967
- Running time: 75 minutes
- Country: Yugoslavia
- Language: Serbo-Croatian

The Knife (Serbian: Нож / Nož) is a 1967 Yugoslav crime mystery thriller film written and directed by Žika Mitrović. The plot follows the investigation into the murder of a popular schlager singer, Alexander Kisch (Zafir Hadžimanov in his debut role), conducted by investigator Marko (Bata Živojinović) and his assistant (Ljubiša Samardžić). The supporting cast includes Vera Čukić, Rade Marković, and Mija Aleksić.

The Yugoslav Film Archive restored this film in cooperation with Centar Film. The film was screened as part of the European project "A Season of Classic Films" on 11 December 2025.

== Plot ==
Upon returning to Belgrade from Zagreb, fashion model Ana Vagner discovers the body of her boyfriend, schlager singer Alexander Kisch, murdered in his apartment. Police investigator Marko and his assistant are assigned to the case. The pathologist informs Marko that Kisch was stabbed to death around midnight. While searching the apartment, the detectives find an envelope addressed "To Saša". Kisch's landlady tells them that Saša is a journalist who wrote a newspaper column about the singer, while Ana insists that Kisch was universally loved by everyone who knew him.

A mysterious tipster calls Marko, urging him to look into the manager of Kisch's building. During further questioning, Ana claims that a gambler named Zlatko Ilić killed Kisch and had previously made similar threats against her. The detectives track down Zlatko, but he insists he never threatened Kisch and was only trying to claim a car the singer had gifted him. That evening, Marko and his assistant interrogate the building manager, Adam, and discover that neither he nor his daughter Mila have a solid alibi for the night of the murder. Marko then receives another tip from the anonymous caller, warning him of a break-in at the crime scene. In the apartment, they catch Kisch's friend, Beli Pavlović. Beli admits to threatening Kisch after the singer stole one of his songs, but swears he didn't kill him.

While questioning attorney Kosta Petrov, the detectives learn that Kisch had once accidentally run over an elderly man and hired Kosta as his defense counsel—only to sleep with Kosta's wife, Sonja, causing their divorce. Sonja denies the affair, claiming she was never "caught in bed" with Kisch, that the divorce was over other matters, and that her subsequent split from Kisch was amicable. Kosta later hands over an incriminating letter containing threats from Adam's daughter, Mila. Realizing Kosta was the anonymous informant all along, the detectives continue their search and find the murder weapon — a knife—hidden in the building's boiler room that night.

When questioned later, Saša reveals he witnessed Mila threatening to kill Kisch for breaking up with her. Brought in to testify about her relationship with the victim, Mila lies about her whereabouts during the murder. A breakthrough comes from the forensics lab: the killer cut themselves during the attack, leaving behind blood contaminated with malaria parasites. The following day, Zlatko ambushes Ana and Beli, forcing them to hand over the keys to the car Kisch had signed over to him. Following a high-speed police chase, Zlatko admits he won the car from Kisch in a gamble but vehemently denies the murder.

Meanwhile, Adam confesses to the crime, claiming he stabbed Kisch twice in the back. Suspecting Adam is merely taking the fall to protect his daughter, Marko asks him to identify the murder weapon from a lineup, which Adam fails to do. Marko then reviews a public health registry of local malaria patients and finds Sonja's name, concluding that she is the true killer. Marko promptly arrests Sonja for the murder. The next day, the detectives learn that Beli has taken Kisch's crown as the country's top schlager star, finally performing his stolen song once again.

== Cast ==
- Bata Živojinović as Marko
- Ljubiša Samardžić as Marko's assistant
- Vera Čukić as Ana Vagner
- Rade Marković as Kosta Petrov
- Mija Aleksić as Zlatko Ilić
- Zafir Hadžimanov as Alexander Kisch
- Dara Čalenić as Sonja Petrov
- Vesna Krajina as Mila
- Janez Vrhovec as Adam
- Zoran Milosavljević as Beli Pavlović
- Petar Slovenski as Saša
- Dara Milošević as Kosta's mother
- Predrag Tasovac as Gartner
- Tomanija Đuričko as Kisch's landlady

== See also ==
- Cinema of Serbia
