= The Girl (1965 film) =

- Devojka
- Directed by: Puriša Đorđević
- Written by: Puriša Đorđević
- Starring: Milena Dravić; Ljubiša Samardžić; Rade Marković; Mija Aleksić; Bekim Fehmiu
- Edited by: Vanja Bjenjaš
- Production companies: Avala film Kino klub Beograd
- Release date: 1965
- Running time: 77 min
- Country: SFR Yugoslavia
- Language: Serbo-Croatian

The Girl (Serbo-Croatian: Devojka, Serbian Cyrillic: Девојка) is a 1965 Yugoslav film written and directed by Serbian director Puriša Đorđević. It is the first instance of events from the Second World War and the immediate post-war period being shown via unconventional art film techniques in Yugoslavia. It is the first entry in Đorđević's wartime tetralogy, the other three being The Dream (1966), The Morning (1967) and Noon (1968). The film belongs to the Yugoslav Black Wave movement.

== Plot ==
The film is concerned with the way multiple characters experience war, with its main focus set on a love story between a soldier and a village girl, both of whom are partisans. War is shown through the lens of the couple, as well as a photographer and a German officer. Despite the tragic ending, the girl's indestructible love for the soldier triumphs.

== Cast ==
- Milena Dravić as girl
- Ljubiša Samardžić as partisan
- Rade Marković as German sergeant
- Mija Aleksić as villager
- Bekim Fehmiu
- Siniša Ivetić
- Milenko Kirović
- Nenad Mićović

== Legacy ==
The Yugoslav Film Archive, in accordance with its authorities based on the Law on Cultural Heritage, declared one hundred Serbian feature films (1911–1999) as cultural heritage of great importance on December 28, 2016. The Girl is also on that list.
