= Noon (film) =

- Podne
- Directed by: Puriša Đorđević
- Written by: Puriša Đorđević
- Produced by: Boško Savić; Petar Gojšina
- Starring: Ljubiša Samardžić; Neda Arnerić; Faruk Begoli
- Cinematography: Bogić Risimović-Risim
- Edited by: Mirjana Mitić
- Music by: Miodrag Ilić
- Production companies: Avala film Dunav film
- Release date: 1968
- Running time: 82 min
- Country: Yugoslavia
- Language: Serbo-Croatian

Noon (Serbo-Croatian: Podne, Serbian Cyrillic: Подне) is a 1968 Yugoslav film written and directed by Serbian director Puriša Đorđević. It is the final entry in Đorđević's wartime tetralogy, the first three being The Girl (1965), The Dream (1966) and The Morning (1967). The film belongs to the Yugoslav Black Wave movement.

== Plot ==
The film is about a love story between a Russian who is an employee of the Soviet embassy in Yugoslavia and a Yugoslav girl. On the first night after their wedding, the radio broadcasts news about the conflict between the communist parties of their countries. They are forced to part with little hope of meeting again.

== Cast ==
- Ljubiša Samardžić as Ljubiša
- Neda Arnerić as Neda
- Faruk Begoli as Mishka
- Dušica Žegarac as Tanja
- Mija Aleksić as Straja
- Ljuba Tadić as Ljuba
- Drago Čumić as informer Čuma
- Rade Marković as Ljubiša
- Dragoljub Vojnov as artist
- Predrag Ćeramilac
- Predrag Milinković
- Husein Čokić
- Olga Jančevecka
- Gordana Gošić
- Siniša Ivetić
- Nikola Jovanović
- Miodrag Kravljanac
- Ratko Miletić
- Ružica Veljović
- Mihajlo Popović
