= The Elusive Summer of '68 =

1984 Yugoslav film

- Directed by: Goran Paskaljević
- Written by: Gordan Mihić
- Produced by: Milan Žmukić; Boško Savić
- Starring: Slavko Štimac; Danilo Stojković; Mira Banjac
- Cinematography: Miljen Kreka Kljaković
- Edited by: Olga Skrigin
- Music by: Zoran Hristić
- Release date: January 31, 1984
- Running time: 91 minutes
- Country: Yugoslavia
- Language: Serbian

The Elusive Summer of '68 (Serbo-Croatian: Varljivo leto '68; Serbian Cyrillic: Варљиво лето '68) is a 1984 Yugoslav film directed by Goran Paskaljević. It depicts a summer dominated by protests, as seen from the point of view of a teenage boy in Yugoslavia.

Through collaborative work, director Goran Paskaljević and screenwriter Gordan Mihić have created a film that is both a love story and a political comedy set in the summer of 1968. The protagonist, high school graduate Petar, spends his summer in an idyllic and patriarchal province where the echoes of tumultuous global and domestic political events reach. His world is populated by women who are the objects of his youthful desires—married ladies, shy peers, provocative professors, and others.

Parallel to the film, a television series with the same name was also produced, which was broadcast in the same year on Radio Television Belgrade. The Yugoslav Film Archive included the film among the one hundred Serbian feature films that were declared of great cultural significance on December 28, 2016.

== Plot ==
During the summer of 1968, in the middle of various political changes in Yugoslavia, most notably student demonstrations, high school graduate Petar Cvetković searches for the love of his life by falling in love alternately and simultaneously with multiple women, mostly mature and married ones: a pharmacist, a baker, a librarian, both daughters of the president of the court, and his sociology professor, for whom he chooses a topic related to Marxism for his graduation thesis. The need to finally find the woman of his life leads Petar into a series of humorous situations, bewildering his father, a municipal judge with dogmatic beliefs who believes that youth should be raised with a "firm hand" and who suffers due to his bourgeois background. When Petar finally finds true love, a young Czech girl, their romance is suddenly interrupted by the Soviet occupation of Czechoslovakia which forces her to return home.

== Cast ==
- Slavko Štimac as Petar Cvetković
- Danilo Stojković as Veselin Cvetković
- Mira Banjac as Petar's mother
- Mija Aleksić as Petar's grandfather
- Ivana Mihić as Vladica Cvetković
- Andrija Mrkaić as Tadija Cvetković
- Sanja Vejnović as Ruženjka Hrabalova
- Dragana Varagić as Jagodinka Simonović
- Neda Arnerić as Olja Miranovski
- Miodrag Radovanović as President of the court Micić
- Branka Petrić as Leposava
- Dragan Zarić as School Principal
- Predrag Tasovac as Man on the beach
- Branko Cvejić as Kum Spasoje

== Background ==
The original screenplay by Gordan Mihić, titled "Samo jednom se živi" (You Only Live Once), presented a story about the relationship between a grandfather, father, and son set in contemporary times (early 1980s) and was intended for director Živojin Pavlović. After a prolonged period of being held by Centar Film, the screenplay was offered to Goran Paskaljević, who decided to shift the film's setting to the "turbulent and pivotal" year of 1968. Wanting to create a film that would contain his personal signature, he introduced certain details into the screenplay, such as a young Czech girl, graduation thesis on Marxism, and others. Additionally, Paskaljević felt the need to address the events of 1968—protests in Paris, student demonstrations in Belgrade, the Soviet intervention in Czechoslovakia—since his generation believed at the time that this year was pivotal, that something would change, and the world would become a better place. As he didn't have the desire to make a film about student demonstrations, he decided to create a sentimental comedy with political content and depict how tumultuous political events impact the lives of ordinary people.

The decision to shift the film's setting from the early 1980s to 1968 was personal for Paskaljević. In that year, he was a twenty-one-year-old student in his first year of film directing at the Faculty of Film and Television (FAMU) in Prague. He witnessed Dubček's reforms during the Prague Spring and the attempt to create "socialism with a human face." In June 1968, when he was at the end of his first year, he received news of student demonstrations in Yugoslavia, but he returned to Belgrade only after everything was over. During his stay in Prague, he met a Czech girl named Mirka, with whom he fell in love. Together with him, she came to Yugoslavia during the holidays, and they spent a month on the Adriatic coast. In August, Mirka returned to Prague, and on the day before the Soviet intervention, August 20, 1968, she left Czechoslovakia with her family for Switzerland. Her father, who held a higher position, was informed about what would happen and managed to obtain visas for himself, his wife, and daughters. When Paskaljević returned to Prague for his studies at the end of August, he couldn't find her, and he lost all contact with her (he only met Mirka again years later in America, where she owned a fashion boutique in Los Angeles). His personal love story served as a motive for introducing the character of Ruženka Hrabalova, a Czech holidaymaker, with whom the main character falls in love.

As a young film student, Paskaljević was particularly influenced by Czech director Jiří Menzel, whom he met through mutual friends. As a lover of Czech films from the 1960s, which were stylized charming comedies, he decided that this film should pay homage to this period of Czech cinema. Since the original title of the screenplay, Samo jednom se živi, had to be changed due to its similarity to the title of Rajko Grlić's film Samo jednom se ljubi (You Love Only Once) Paskaljević decided to paraphrase the title of Menzel's film Rozmarné léto, made in 1968, and gave the film the title "Varljivo leto" (Deceptive Summer, or Elusive Summer). With the help of Ružica Petrović, the producer at Avala Film, the film ultimately received the title "Varljivo leto '68" (The Elusive Summer of '68).

== Production ==
Despite the fact that Paskaljević had five successful feature films to his name, produced by Centar Film, this production house did not provide enough funds for the realization of the film, even though the shooting plan was already prepared. Offended because the production house did not believe in his film and was unwilling to accept the financial risk, despite his previous film Suton (Twilight Time) having brought in half a million dollars in profit, Paskaljević had almost given up on making the film. In August 1983, while returning by plane from Pula, he accidentally met Milan Vukos, the director of Radio Television Belgrade, and told him about the problem with Centar Film and the lack of funds for the film's realization. Since Vukos was interested in the story, he told him to bring the screenplay, and he would see how he could help.

A few days after receiving the screenplay, Vukos called Paskaljević and offered to have Radio Television Belgrade provide additional funding for the film's realization, on the condition that a three-episode television series be simultaneously produced. He accepted this proposal and, along with Mihić, expanded the screenplay. This was the third film project of the Paskaljević-Mihić duo, following the successful films Čuvar plaže u zimskom periodu (Beach Guard in Winter) in 1976 and Pas koji je voleo vozove (The Dog Who Loved Trains) in 1977.

Although the film's story is set from May to August, the filming of the movie was delayed and took place at the end of September and the beginning of October in 1983 due to production delays. Because of the good weather, the film was shot in just about twenty days. The famous beach scene was filmed on October 5 on the Danube River near the village of Čortanovci in the Syrmia region, on the slopes of the Fruška Gora mountain. Fearing that there would be no more sunny days resembling summer, all beach scenes were shot in a single day.

To capture the atmosphere of a small provincial town, much of the film was shot in Sremski Karlovci (Karlovci Gymnasium, the railway station, and others), while some scenes were done in Zemun. Nevertheless, a significant part of the film was shot in the center of Belgrade, as the house of the fictional Cvetković film family was actually the house of the scientist Jovan Cvijić, which houses his memorial museum. This house is located on Jelena Ćetković Street, in Kopitareva Gradina, the same location where other projects like the film Nešto između and TV series Bolji život and Ulica lipa were also filmed. The beach in Čortanovci gained particular popularity, and the area where the film was shot is now known as "Varljivo Leto Beach."

== Selection of the lead actors ==
When choosing the actors to portray the main characters in the film, Paskaljević immediately decided to cast Danilo "Bata" Stojković and Mira Banjac as Petar's parents, as he had collaborated with them in his first feature film, Čuvar plaže u zimskom periodu (Beach Guard in Winter), where they played Milovan and Spasenija Pašanović, the parents of the main character. This highly successful duo also appeared the following year in Boža Nikolić's film Balkanski špijun (Balkan Spy). There was no hesitation in selecting Mija Aleksić for the role of Petar's grandfather.

Paskaljević hesitated when it came to choosing the lead actor, as both he and Slavko Štimac were concerned about whether the then twenty-three-year-old actor could convincingly portray the character of high school graduate Petar Cvetković. However, believing in his authenticity, Paskaljević made the decision to entrust him with this role. When it came to selecting the actress for the role of Petar's sister Vladica, the director was not satisfied with the proposed candidates. He decided to offer this role to the thirteen-year-old Ivana Mihić, the daughter of the screenwriter Gordan Mihić. As Paskaljević suspected, Mihić initially resisted this idea, but he was supported in this endeavor by Mihić's wife, Vera Čukić, and their daughter accepted the role, treating it as a kind of game. The role of the youngest member of the Cvetković family, little Tadija, was played by five-year-old Andrija Mrkaić, who was selected through auditions.

== Reception and critiques ==
Petar and Jagodinka in an erotic embrace—a popular scene from the film—has also been immortalized on the wall of a bakery in Vranje.

The film premiered on the last day of January 1984 at the "Balkan" cinema in Belgrade. From the very start, the film faced obstacles, and the premiere was not held at the then-prestigious cinemas "Jadran" and "Kozara." Most of the domestic film critics belittled the film, and it was not even included in the supporting program of the Yugoslav Film Festival in Pula, where films were screened out of competition. The explanation given by the jury at the time was that the film did not communicate well enough with the audience. According to Paskaljević's opinion, the film faced challenges due to jealousy from his colleagues, given the success of his previous films. However, he received support from the film crew and the ensemble cast, who accompanied him to premieres of the film in various cities.

Despite weak advertising and poor reviews, the film was well received by audiences, which recognized the film's energy. The cinema hall at "Balkan" was full in all showtimes for several months, and the film was seen by over 160,000 viewers in Belgrade alone.The Yugoslav Film Archive, in collaboration with Vip mobile and the film's producer, Centar film, digitally restored this classic. The premiere took place on August 23, 2018, at the closing of the first International Danube Film Festival in Smederevo.

== Awards ==
- Bastia Italian Film Festival (1984) — Grand Prix of the Jury

== Legacy ==
The Yugoslav Film Archive, in accordance with its authority under the Cultural Heritage Law, declared one hundred Serbian feature films (1911-1999) as cultural heritage of great importance on December 28, 2016. The Elusive Summer of '68 is included in this list.
