= Faruk Begolli =

Kosovar actor (1944–2007)

- Born: Faruk Mahmutbegolli; 14 February 1944; Peja, Albanian-occupied Yugoslavia (now Kosovo)
- Died: 23 August 2007 (aged 63); Pristina, United Nations Administered Kosovo, Serbia (now Kosovo)
- Known for: Acting
- Spouse: Zoja Đoković (divorced)

Faruk Begolli (14 February 1944 – 22 August 2007) was a prominent Yugoslav and Kosovan actor.

== Early life ==
Begolli attended high school in Pristina and graduated from the Academy of Film in Belgrade in 1966.

== Career ==
Begolli played in more than 60 films, starting with Veljko Bulajić's Pogled u zenicu Sunca (1966). He cooperated with director Puriša Đorđević in his films Podne (Noon), Jutro (The Morning), and San (The Dream), and his notable roles include Bitka na Neretvi, Čuvar plaže u zimskom periodu and Derviš i Smrt (The Dervish and Death).

His last major lead role was in Ekrem Kryeziu's Dashuria e Bjeshkëve të Nemuna (The Love of the Accursed Mountains, 1997), and his last appearance was in Etjet e Kosovës (Kosovo's Thirsts, 2006), for which he co-wrote the script.

== Personal life ==
In the late 1980s, Begolli returned from Belgrade to Kosovo, where he worked as a professor at the Faculty of Drama of the University of Pristina.

Begolli was married to the Serbian ballerina Zoja Đoković for 17 years. Đoković took his surname, and kept it after the two divorced. Through Đoković, Begolli was the stepfather of the Serbian musician Relja Popović.

Begolli died in 2007 after a long battle with cancer.

== Selected filmography ==
- Pogled u zjenicu sunca (1966)
- The Dream (1966) - Petar
- Deca vojvode Smita (1967) - Mirko
- The Morning (1967) - Rus Miska
- Uka i Bjeshkëve të nemura (1968) - Partizan
- Brat doktora Homera (1968) - Seljak / peasant
- Podne (1968) - Rus Misko
- Operacija Beograd (1968) - Jasa
- Sarajevski atentat (1968) - Nedeljko Cabrinovic
- Battle of Neretva (1969) - Stevo
- Moja strana svijeta (1969)
- Rekvijem (1970)
- Draga Irena! (1970) - Misko
- Prva ljubav (1970)
- Si të vdiset (1972)
- Walter Defends Sarajevo (1972) - Branko
- SB zatvara krug (1974) - Agent Stipe
- Dervis i smrt (1974) - Mula Jusuf
- Crveni udar (1974) - Slikar
- Pavle Pavlovic (1974) - Student preprodavac
- Cuvar plaze u zimskom periodu (1976) - Draganov prijatelj
- Vrhovi Zelengore (1976) - Rajko
- Stici pre svitanja (1978) - Doktor
- Sudbine (1978)
- Zestoke godine (1978) - Aleksandar Dragovic
- Lyubov i yarost (1978)
- Kur pranvera vonohet (1979)
- Partizanska eskadrila (1979) - Porucnik Begovic
- Përroi vërshues (1981)
- 13. jul (1982) - Partizan Meho
- Timocka buna (1983) - Potpukovnik
- Dih (1983) - Djordje
- Idi mi, dodji mi (1983) - Marijin kolega I
- Mahovina na asfaltu (1983)
- Opasni trag (1984) - Inspektor Ramiz
- Proka (1985)
- Kuca pored pruge (1988) - Hasan
- Azra (1988) - Osman
- The Legendary Life of Ernest Hemingway (1989)
- Noc u kuci moje majke (1991) - Kum Radovan
- Srcna dama (1991) - Azem
- Cartier Project (1991) - Selim
- Bulevar revolucije (1992) - Clan komisije na ispitu
- 10 Minuta (2004), directed by Burim Haliti
- Etjet e Kosovës (2006) - Old Albanian (final film role)
