= Vojislav Govedarica =

Serbian-American actor (1940–2023)

Vojislav Govedarica (1940 – December 5, 2023) was a Serbian-American actor known for his roles in Rambo: First Blood Part II, Little Nikita, and Lionheart.

Govedarica died on December 5, 2023.

== Filmography ==
Year	Title	Role	Notes
1964	Massacre at Marble City	Mescalero	
1967	Praznik		
1967	The Morning	Nemac - zarobljenik	
1968	Comandamenti per un gangster	Thug	Uncredited
1968	Noon		
1968	Operacija Beograd	Ilegalac	
1968	The Valley of Death	Roter Büffel [Red Buffalo]	
1969	Veliki dan		
1969	Ubistvo na svirep i podmukao nacin i iz niskih pobuda	Siledzija	
1972	Devojka sa Kosmaja		
1972	I Bog stvori kafansku pevacicu		
1973	Zuta	Momir Tanic	
1973	The Bloody Vultures of Alaska	Achua-hua	
1973	Ratko e l'orso		
1978	Coach	Igrac sportske prognoze	
1985	Rambo: First Blood Part II	Sergeant Yushin	
1986	Modern Girls	Doorman	
1987	Code Name Zebra	Otto	
1987	Russkies	Boris	
1988	Little Nikita	Joe	
1990	Lionheart	Sgt. Hartog	
1991	Alligator II: The Mutation	Carmen	
1992	Universal Soldier	Thug in bar	Uncredited
1993	Nowhere to Run	Prisoner	
1993	The Evil Inside Me	Nicolai	
1996	Balance of Power	Voyo	
1997	Mars	Pinrake	
1999	Hostile Environment	Belkov	
