= The Dream (1966 film) =

1966 film

- Directed by: Puriša Đorđević
- Written by: Puriša Đorđević
- Starring: Ljubiša Samardžić
- Cinematography: Mihajlo Popović
- Edited by: Mirjana Mitić
- Release date: 14 July 1966
- Running time: 93 min
- Country: SFR Yugoslavia
- Language: Serbo-Croatian

The Dream or Dream (Serbo-Croatian: San, Serbian Cyrillic: Сан) is a 1966 Yugoslav war film written and directed by Serbian director Puriša Đorđević. It is the second entry in Đorđević's wartime tetralogy, the other three being The Girl (1965), The Morning (1967) and Noon (1968). It belongs to the Yugoslav Black Wave movement. The film entered the competition at the 17th Berlin International Film Festival.

== Plot ==
During 1941, in the liberated cities of Čačak and Užice, a young man and a girl dream of a better future. Their plans are interrupted by the breakout of the war in Yugoslavia. However, in spite of German advances, the couple continues to dream knowing that dreams can never be taken away.

== Cast ==
- Ljubiša Samardžić as Mali
- Mihajlo Janketić as boy
- Olivera Katarina as girl
- Mija Aleksić as gypsy
- Ljuba Tadić as Mile the Grek
- Siniša Ivetić as Heinrich
- Aleksandar Stojković as barber
- Bata Živojinović as Lazar
- Stole Aranđelović as soldier
- Faruk Begolli as Petar
- Viktor Starčić as orchestra conductor
- Karlo Bulić as professor
- Zoran Bečić
- Dušan Golumbovski as informant
- Radmila Guteša as Danica
- Svetolik Nikačević as the Judge
- Milutin Mićović as groom

== Awards and honours ==
- Pula Film Festival, 1966 - Silver Arena for Best Film (Puriša Đorđević)
- Berlin International Film Festival, 1967 - Nominated for Best Film (Puriša Đorđević)

== Legacy ==
The Yugoslav Film Archive, in accordance with its authorities based on the Law on Cultural Heritage, declared one hundred Serbian feature films (1911–1999) as cultural heritage of great importance on 28 December 2016. The Dream is also on that list.
