= The Morning (film) =

- Jutro
- Directed by: Puriša Đorđević
- Written by: Puriša Đorđević
- Produced by: Mladen Todić; Petar Gojšina
- Starring: Ljubiša Samardžić; Neda Arnerić; Milena Dravić; Mija Aleksić; Ljuba Tadić
- Edited by: Mirjana Mitić
- Music by: Miodrag Ilić
- Production company: Dunav film
- Release date: 1967
- Running time: 84 minutes
- Country: SFR Yugoslavia
- Language: Serbo-Croatian

The Morning (Serbo-Croatian: Jutro, Serbian Cyrillic: Јутро) is a 1967 Yugoslav film written and directed by Serbian director Puriša Đorđević. It is the third entry in Đorđević's wartime tetralogy, the other three being The Girl (1965), The Dream (1966) and Noon (1968). The film belongs to the Yugoslav Black Wave movement.

The film entered the competition at the 28th Venice International Film Festival and Ljubiša Samardžić won the Volpi Cup for Best Actor for his role. It was also the Yugoslav entry at the Berlin International Film Festival in 1967.

== Plot ==
The Second World War is over, but its consequences continue to plague people. In the initial days of peace, amidst conflicts like dealing with the former enemy's collaborators and executing traitors, a former soldier finds himself unable to stop killing. The war within him rages on, creating immense problems in his relationships with himself and others.

== Cast ==
- Ljubiša Samardžić as Mali
- Neda Arnerić as girl
- Milena Dravić as Slobodanka
- Mija Aleksić as Captain Straja
- Ljuba Tadić as General Milan Prekić
- Neda Spasojević as Marklena
- Olga Jančevecka as Stana
- Dragomir Čumić as the killer
- Vojislav Govedarica as captured German
- Aleksandar Gruden as Lazović
- Mihailo Janketić as Major Sava
- Staniša Kovačev as captured Italian
- Viktor Starčić as old prisoner
- Danilo Bata Stojković as soldier
- Eugen Verber as merchant
- Milorad Jovanovic
- Herman Miholić
- Ratko Miletić
- Predrag Milinković
- Svetolik Nikacevic
- Vlasta Velisavljević
- Ružica Veljović

== Awards and honours ==
- Venice Film Festival, 1967 – Volpi Cup for Best Actor (Ljubiša Samardžić), nomination for Best Film (Puriša Đorđević)
- Pula Film Festival, 1967 – Golden Arena for Best Director, Best Screenplay and Best Film (Puriša Đorđević)

== Legacy ==
The Yugoslav Film Archive, in accordance with its authorities based on the Law on Cultural Heritage, declared one hundred Serbian feature films (1911–1999) as cultural heritage of great importance on December 28, 2016. The Morning is also on that list.
