= Golden Arena for Best Supporting Actress =

- Awarded for: "Performance by an actress in a supporting role"
- Country: Yugoslavia (1958–1990); Croatia (1992–present)
- Presented by: Pula Film Festival Jury
- First award: 1958
- Currently held by: Ivana Roščić (2023)
- Website: Official Website

The following is a list of winners of the Golden Arena for Best Supporting Actress at the Pula Film Festival.

== List of winners ==
=== Yugoslav Film Awards (1958–90) ===
Year	Winner	English title	Original title
1958	Mia Oremović	H-8	H-8
1959	Dara Čalenić		Vetar je stao pred zoru and Gospođa ministarka
1960	Svetlana Mišković		Tri Ane
1961	Stanislava Pešić		Pesma
1962	Olivera Marković		Kozara and Sibirska ledi Magbet
1963	Wasn't awarded		
1964	Milena Dravić		Lito vilovito
1965	Ružica Sokić		Gorki deo reke
1966	Milena Dravić (2)		Do pobjede i dalje and Rondo
1967	Milena Dravić (3) (shared)		Nemirni and Jutro
1967	Snežana Nikšić (shared)		Na papirnatih avionih
1968	Gizela Vuković		U raskoraku
1969	Milena Dravić (4)		Cross country and Horoskop
1970	Jagoda Kaloper	Handcuffs	Lisice
1971	Majda Potokar	Red Wheat	Rdeče klasje
1972	Neda Spasojević	Traces of a Black Haired Girl	Tragovi crne devojke
1973	Milena Zupančič		Cvetje v jeseni
1974	Ružica Sokić	Guns of War	Užička republika
1975	Angelca Hlebce		Strah
1976	Mira Banjac	The Farm in the Small Marsh	Salaš u malom ritu
1977	Mira Banjac (2)	Don't Lean Out the Window	Ne naginji se van
1978	Mila Kačič	Real Pests	To so gadi
1979	Tanja Knezić	Court Martial	Prijeki sud
1980	Dušica Žegarac	Special Treatment	Poseban tretman
1981	Wasn't awarded		
1982	Mira Furlan	Cyclops	Kiklop
1983	Olivera Marković (2)		Balkan ekspres
1984	Vesna Pećanac	Unseen Wonder	Čudo neviđeno
1985	Gordana Gadžić		Tajvanska kanasta
1986	Nada Đurevska		Od zlata jabuka
1987	Vesna Trivalić	Oktoberfest	Oktoberfest
1988	Ena Begović	The Glembays	Glembajevi
1989	Radmila Živković	The Meeting Point	Sabirni centar
1990	Anja Popović		Početni udarac

=== Croatian Film Awards (1990–present) ===
Year	Winner	English title	Original title
1991	Festival cancelled^{[A]}		
1992	Zoja Odak	Story from Croatia	Priča iz Hrvatske
1993	Wasn't awarded		
1994	National competition program cancelled^{[B]}		
1995	Nadežda Perišić	Each Time We Part Away	Svaki put kad se rastajemo
1996	Matija Prskalo	How the War Started on My Island	Kako je počeo rat na mom otoku
1997	Alma Prica	The Third Woman	Treća žena
1998	Suzana Nikolić	The Three Men of Melita Žganjer	Tri muškarca Melite Žganjer
1999	Edita Majić	Wish I Were a Shark	Da mi je biti morski pas
2000	Nina Violić	Cashier Wants to Go to the Seaside	Blagajnica hoće ići na more
2001	Wasn't awarded		
2002	Olga Pakalović	Fine Dead Girls	Fine mrtve djevojke
2003	Dubravka Ostojić	Below the Line	Ispod crte
2004	Vera Zima	Sorry for Kung Fu	Oprosti za kung fu
2005	Dora Lipovčan	Two Players from the Bench	Dva igrača s klupe
2006	Nataša Janjić	All for Free	Sve džaba
2007	Olga Pakalović (2)	I Have to Sleep, My Angel	Moram spavat', anđele
2008	Nada Gačešić-Livaković	The Lika Cinema	Kino Lika
2009	Lena Politeo	In the Land of Wonders	U zemlji čudesa
2010	Ksenija Marinković	Just Between Us	Neka ostane među nama
2011	Iva Mihalić	Daddy	Ćaća
2012	Olga Pakalović (3)	Halima's Path	Halimin put
2013	Lana Barić	Hush	Šuti
2014	Anita Matić Delić	Happy Endings	Happy Endings
2015	Nives Ivanković	The High Sun	Zvizdan
2016	Tena Nemet Brankov	The Trampoline	Trampolin
2017	Arijana Čulina	Quit Staring at My Plate	Ne gledaj mi u pijat
2018	Nataša Janjić (2)	Comic Sans	Comic Sans
2019	Olga Pakalović (4)	General	General
2020	Ivana Roščić	Tereza37	Tereza37
2021	Danica Curcic	Murina	Murina
2022	Nives Ivanković (2)	The Staffroom	Zbornica
2023	Ivana Roščić (2)	Carbide	Garbura
2024	Judita Franković	Holy Family	Sveta obitelj
2026	Aleksandra Janković	Honey Bunny	Koke

== Footnotes ==
A. Although the festival was opened on 26 July 1991 and a press screening of Zrinko Ogresta's film Fragments: Chronicle of a Vanishing was held, the festival board presided by Antun Vrdoljak decided to cancel the festival in protest against the violence of the Ten-Day War which was going on in Slovenia and the initial stages of the Croatian War of Independence. Nine films were supposed to be screened in the competition program.

B.: The awards ceremony was cancelled in 1994 as only one Croatian feature film was made in the preceding 12 months (The Price of Life directed by Bogdan Žižić). The festival was held in spite of this, but the usual national competition program was replaced with a retrospective of animated films produced by the Zagreb School of Animated Film and a selection of documentaries, while the main program featured premieres of six American wide release movies.

== Multiple winners ==
The following actresses have received multiple awards. The list is sorted by the number of total awards. Years in bold indicate wins in Yugoslav competition (1958–1990). Shared wins are indicated with an asterisk (*).

- 4 : Milena Dravić (**1964**, **1966**, **1967***, **1969**)
- 4 : Olga Pakalović (2002, 2007, 2012, 2019)
- 2 : Ružica Sokić (**1965**, **1974**)
- 2 : Mira Banjac (**1976**, **1977**)
- 2 : Olivera Marković (**1962**, **1983**)
- 2 : Nataša Janjić (2006, 2018)
- 2 : Nives Ivanković (2015, 2022)
- 2 : Ivana Roščić (2020, 2023)
