= The Role of My Family in the Revolution =

1971 drama film

- Directed by: Bahrudin Čengić
- Screenplay by: Bahrudin Čengić; Bora Ćosić; Branko Vučićević
- Produced by: Vera Mihić-Jolić
- Starring: Dragan Nikolić; Danilo Stojković
- Cinematography: Karpo Aćimović Godina
- Edited by: Vuksan Lukovac
- Music by: Kornelije Kovač
- Release date: 1971

The Role of My Family in the Revolution (Serbo-Croatian: Uloga moje porodice u svjetskoj revoluciji) is a 1971 Yugoslav drama film co-written and directed by Bahrudin Čengić.

It premiered at the 18th Pula Film Festival, in which it won the Golden Arena for Best Production Design and the Silver Arena for Best Direction. It was later screened at the 32nd Venice International Film Festival.

== Cast ==
- Dragan Nikolić as Vaculić
- Danilo Stojković as Strogi
- Branka Petrić as Drugarica
- Milena Dravić as Devojka
- Milivoje Tomić as Otac
- Davor Korić as Dečak
- Erika Druzović as Majka
- Mija Aleksić as Adolf Hitler
- Stole Aranđelović as Uroš
- Rade Marković as Strogi
