= Stipe Delić =

Croatian film director

- Born: 23 June 1925; Makarska, Kingdom of Serbs, Croats and Slovenes
- Died: 1 April 1999 (aged 73); Zagreb, Croatia
- Occupation: Film director
- Years active: 1955-1982

Stipe Delić (23 June 1925 – 1 April 1999) was a Croatian film director. His 1973 film The Battle of Sutjeska was entered into the 8th Moscow International Film Festival where it won a Special Prize.

== Selected filmography ==
- The Battle of Sutjeska (1973)
