= Natasha (2001 film) =

2001 film by Ljubiša Samardžić

- Directed by: Ljubiša Samardžić
- Starring: Tijana Kondić; Nikola Đuričko
- Release date: 26 April 2001
- Running time: 1h 32min
- Country: Yugoslavia
- Language: Serbian

Natasha (Serbian: Наташа / Nataša) is a 2001 Yugoslav drama film directed by Ljubiša Samardžić. It was the first film to use the overthrow of Slobodan Milošević as a backdrop for its story.

== Cast ==
- Tijana Kondić - Natasa
- Nikola Đuričko - Marko
- Anica Dobra - Sandra
- Davor Janjić - Kiza
- Dragan Bjelogrlić - Aca
- Neda Arnerić - Biljana (Natasina majka)
- Boris Milivojević - Jezdimir Vasiljevic - Dzeni
- Zoran Cvijanović - Milutin
