= The Sun Is Far Away =

1953 film by Radoš Novaković

- Directed by: Radoš Novaković
- Written by: Dobrica Ćosić (novel); Josip Kulundžić
- Cinematography: Nenad Jovičić
- Edited by: Neva Paškulović-Habić
- Music by: Krešimir Baranović
- Production company: Avala Film
- Release date: 18 November 1953
- Running time: 102 minutes
- Country: Yugoslavia
- Language: Serbo-Croatian

The Sun Is Far Away (Serbo-Croatian: Daleko je sunce / Далеко је сунце) is a 1953 Yugoslav war film directed by Radoš Novaković and starring Branko Pleša, Rade Marković and Dragomir Felba. It is a Partisan film, the dominant genre in immediate post-war Yugoslav cinema. During the Second World War, a group of Yugoslav Partisans battle against occupying Bulgarian and German forces.

== Cast ==
- Branko Pleša as Pavle
- Rade Marković as Uča
- Dragomir Felba as Gvozden
- Jozo Laurenčić as Jefta
- Marko Todorovic as Žarki
- Olga Brajević as Bojana
- Janez Vrhovec as Nikola
- Rastislav Jović as Vuksan
- Rahela Ferari as Nana
- Slobodan Stanković as Mališa
- Uros Kravljaca as Partizan
- Miroslav Čangalović as a solo singer

== Bibliography ==
- Liehm, Mira & Liehm, Antonín J. The Most Important Art: Eastern European Film After 1945. University of California Press, 1977.
