= I Even Met Happy Gypsies =

1967 Yugoslav film

- Directed by: Aleksandar Petrović
- Written by: Aleksandar Petrović
- Starring: Bekim Fehmiu; Olivera Vučo; Bata Živojinović; Gordana Jovanović; Mija Aleksić
- Cinematography: Tomislav Pinter
- Edited by: Mirjana Mitić
- Music by: Aleksandar Petrović
- Release date: 1967
- Running time: 82 minutes
- Country: Yugoslavia
- Languages: Romani; Serbo-Croatian

I Even Met Happy Gypsies (Serbo-Croatian: Скупљачи перја, Skupljači perja, lit. 'The Feather-Gatherers') is a 1967 Yugoslav film by Serbian director Aleksandar Petrović. The film is centered on Roma people's life in a village in northern Vojvodina, but it also deals with other themes such as love, ethnic and social relationships. Beside Bekim Fehmiu, Olivera Vučo, Bata Živojinović and Mija Aleksić, film features a cast of Roma actors speaking the Romani language. I Even Met Happy Gypsies is considered one of the best films of the Black Wave in Yugoslav cinema.

== Plot summary ==
The protagonist, Beli Bora Perjar, is a charming but mean-spirited Romani man, while his former girlfriend, the kafana singer Lenče, is submissive. Bora is in love with the younger Tisa, who is being offered in marriage by her step-father. The two get themselves in trouble and eventually have to flee. Tisa rejects her husband and she and Bora get married in the church. Tisa tries to get to Belgrade, while Bora stabs a man in a knife fight. They are both, therefore, exiled from their Roma camp, yet their adventures continue.

== Cast ==
- Bekim Fehmiu as Beli Bora Perjar
- Olivera Vučo as Lenče
- Bata Živojinović as Mirta
- Gordana Jovanović as Tisa
- Mija Aleksić as Pavle

Rest of cast listed alphabetically:

- Severin Bijelić as Bigoted man
- Stojan Dečermić as Hladnjača driver 1
- Milivoje Đorđević as Sandor
- Rahela Ferari as Igumanija
- Etelka Filipovski as Bora's wife
- Milorad Jovanović as Toni
- Zoran Longinović as Islednik 1
- Branislav-Ciga Milenković
- Božidar Pavičević-Longa as Hladnjača driver 2
- Velizar Petrović
- Djordje Pura as Islednik 2
- Nina Sajin
- Milivoje Tomić as Romanian
- Janez Vrhovec as judge

== Reception ==
The film was the most popular film in Belgrade for the year with 400,000 admissions, compared to an average of 60,000.

== Awards ==
At the 1967 Cannes Film Festival it was nominated for the Palme d'Or and won the Special Grand Prize of the Jury and the FIPRESCI Prize.

The film was nominated for the 1967 Academy Award for Best Foreign Language Film (event in April 1968) and for the Golden Globe Award for Best Foreign Language Film. Bata Živojinović also won a Golden Arena award for Best Actor at the 1967 Pula Film Festival for his portrayal of Mirta.

== See also ==
- List of submissions to the 40th Academy Awards for Best Foreign Language Film
- List of Yugoslav submissions for the Academy Award for Best Foreign Language Film
