= Jelena Žigon =

Serbian and Yugoslav actress (1933–2018)

Jelena Žigon (Serbian Cyrillic: Јелена Жигон; 3 November 1933 – 10 April 2018), was a Serbian and Yugoslav actress.

== Biography ==
Žigon (maiden name Jovanović, Serbian Cyrillic: Јовановић) was born in Belgrade to a family hailing from Bajina Bašta, while her mother was born in Cetinje and was related to Nicholas I of Montenegro.

During her career, she starred in a number of films and television series. She had her first role in 1950 in the film Municipal Child. She had significant roles in the films like Zika's Dynasty, The Showdown, The Morning, The First Citizen of a Small Town and others. She gained greater popularity with the role of Jelena Todorović in Zika's dynasty .

She dramatized the poetry of Dušan Kostić, Desanka Maksimović, Dragan Kolundžija, and also wrote the script for a stage-musical poem about Simonida, which was performed at the National Theater in Belgrade.

Žigon died in Belgrade after a short illness and she was buried in Belgrade New Cemetery.

With her daughter Ivana Žigon, who is also an actress, she founded the ensemble Kosovo Peonies in 2004. Her husband was fellow actor Stevo Žigon.

== Awards ==
- Golden Ring Award for Best Actress, 1961
- Golden beochug
- Order of Njegoš, I degree, for the care of the wounded, Republika Srpska
- Njegoš Medal from the Metropolitan of Montenegro and the Littoral Amfilohije Radović, Serbian Orthodox Church
- Yugoslav Cinematheque Plaque for Outstanding Contribution to Film, 2006
- Honorary citizen of Aleksandrovac, 2017
- Sergei Bondarchuk Lifetime Achievement Award, Russia, 2018
