= Anticasanova =

1985 film

Anticasanova is a 1985 Croatian film directed by Vladimir Tadej, starring David Bluestone, Elisa Tebith, Milena Dravić, and Ljubiša Samardžić.

== Sources ==
- Anticasanova at hrfilm.hr (in Croatian)
