= Battle of Sutjeska (film) =

1973 film by Stipe Delić

- Directed by: Stipe Delić
- Written by: Branimir Šćepanović; Sergei Bondarchuk; Wolf Mankowitz; Miljenko Smoje; Orson Welles
- Produced by: Bosna Film, Filmska Radna Zajednica (FRZ), Sutjeska Film. Production manager is Nikola Popović
- Starring: Richard Burton; Ljuba Tadić; Irene Papas
- Cinematography: Tomislav Pinter
- Edited by: Vojislav Bjenjas; Roberto Perpignani
- Music by: Mikis Theodorakis
- Distributed by: Paramount Pictures
- Release date: December 11, 1975; (U.S.)
- Running time: 128 minutes
- Country: Yugoslavia
- Languages: Serbo-Croatian; English; German

Battle of Sutjeska (also known as The Fifth Offensive) is a 1973 Yugoslav partisan film directed by Stipe Delić. It tells the story of the famous Battle of Sutjeska, the greatest engagement of the Yugoslav Partisan War. The film is one of the most expensive ever made in Yugoslavia. It was selected as the Yugoslav entry for the Best Foreign Language Film at the 46th Academy Awards, but was not accepted as a nominee. It was also entered into the 8th Moscow International Film Festival where it won a Special Prize.

== Plot ==
German-occupied Bosnia and Herzegovina, 1943; under the faithful leadership of Marshal Tito, the Yugoslav Partisans have, for a number of years, put up a staunch fight against the occupying Axis powers. Despite being out-gunned, outmaneuvered and vastly outnumbered, they managed to recuperate in a harsh mountainous region called Durmitor in northern Montenegro. However, their respite is short-lived as the combined foreign and domestic Axis powers begin an encirclement offensive, outnumbering them 6:1. The Partisans have no choice but to fight their way out of the encirclement, then head towards eastern Bosnia. They finally clash with the Axis on the plains of Sutjeska in south-eastern Bosnia.

Various people are caught up in the fighting, such as a Dalmatian who lost all of his children during the war. As the fighting intensifies, the story and the scenes are drawn more and more into the colossal battle as both sides are forced into a conflict that can only be described as a living hell. Battle scenes are interlaced with the personal agonies and fates of the main characters, from supreme commanders to ordinary soldiers.

The offensive ends in failure for the Axis, but the Partisans are in no mood to celebrate — they have suffered devastating losses. Still, on they march.

== Cast ==
- Richard Burton as Josip Broz Tito
- Ljuba Tadić as Sava Kovačević
- Bata Živojinović as Nikola
- Miroljub Lešo as Boro
- Irene Papas as Boro's Mother
- Milena Dravić as Vera
- Bert Sotlar as Barba
- Boris Dvornik as Ivan
- Rade Marković as Radoš
- Ljubiša Samardžić as Stanojlo
- Milan Puzić as Member of the Partisan Headquarters
- Kole Angelovski as Stanojlo's Friend
- Stole Aranđelović as The Priest
- Relja Bašić as Capt. Stewart
- Branko Špoljar as Member of the General Staff
- Petar Banićević as Capt. William Deakin
- Günter Meisner as Gen. Rudolf Lüters
- Anton Diffring as Gen. Alexander Löhr
- Michael Cramer as Col. Wagner
- Orson Welles as Winston Churchill
- Franco Nero

== See also ==
- List of submissions to the 46th Academy Awards for Best Foreign Language Film
- List of Yugoslav submissions for the Academy Award for Best Foreign Language Film
