= The Sky Through the Trees =

1958 film

- Directed by: Stole Janković
- Written by: Antonije Isaković
- Starring: Branko Pleša
- Cinematography: Mihajlo Popovic
- Release date: 19 September 1958
- Running time: 86 minutes
- Country: Yugoslavia
- Language: Serbo-Croatian

The Sky Through the Trees (Serbian: Кроз грање небо, romanized: Kroz granje nebo) is a 1958 Yugoslav war film directed by Stole Janković. It was entered into the 1st Moscow International Film Festival.

== Cast ==
- Branko Pleša as a wounded man on a stretcher (I)
- Predrag Laković as a wounded man on a stretcher (II)
- Ljuba Kovačević as commander Zekavica
- Jozo Laurenčić as a wounded man lying on his stomach
- Nikola Popovic as Mitar - tifusar
- Salko Repak as a blind old man
- Miroslav Petrović as Faust
- Stole Aranđelović as Tifusar
- Nada Škrinjar as boy's mother, a wounded woman on a stretcher
- Vera Čukić as nurse Branka
- Dragan Šaković as Simo
