= Man Is Not a Bird =

- Directed by: Dušan Makavejev
- Written by: Dušan Makavejev; Raša Popov
- Starring: Milena Dravić; Janez Vrhovec; Eva Ras; Stole Aranđelović; Boris Dvornik
- Cinematography: Aleksandar Petković
- Edited by: Ljubica Nešić; Ivanka Vukasovic
- Music by: Petar Bergamo
- Production company: Avala Film
- Release date: 1965
- Running time: 81 minutes
- Country: Yugoslavia
- Language: Serbo-Croatian

Čovek nije ptica (English title: Man Is Not a Bird) is a European art film made in 1965. It was the first film from director Dušan Makavejev.

== Plot ==
Skilled engineer Jan Rudinski (Janez Vrhovec) comes to town to install heavy mining equipment. While in a barbers, he asks his pretty blonde hairdresser Rajka (Milena Dravic) if she knows where he can find a room. She does, in her parents' home where she lives. She soon starts flirting with him while fending off the advances of a handsome young truck driver (Boris Dvornik).

In an unrelated subplot, mine worker Barbulovic (Stole Aranđelović) gets into one mess after another. He is arrested for starting a bar brawl in which the singer, Fatima, is stabbed. He is released after a few days, and complains to his manager about his docked pay, to no avail. When his wife (Eva Ras) returns home from a visit, she discovers that three of her dresses are missing. She accuses him of giving them to his mistress. When she sees the other woman wearing one at the market, she attacks her rival. They are taken to the police station, but released with some advice.

With her parents away for a few days, Rajka invites Jan to sleep with her. The middle-aged man hesitates, concerned about their age difference, but soon succumbs. They are happy together. When she expresses concern that his work is nearly over and he will be leaving soon, he offers to take her with him. Rajka's parents return and, learning what has been going on, berate the couple.

Jan is asked to complete his work several days early so the plant can be part of a big export deal. When he drives his crew to finish the job as requested, a government representative from Belgrade comes to present him with a medal for his long exemplary service. Jan is puzzled when Rajka does not show up at a concert and banquet in his honor. She, it turns out, has succumbed to the charms of the truck driver. Jan asks her afterward if she has another lover. When she is evasive, he asks how old his rival is; she answers 20 or 22, but claims it does not affect her relationship with Jan. This does not appease his anger, and she flees.

== Cast ==
- Milena Dravic as Rajka
- Janez Vrhovec as Jan Rudinski
- Eva Ras as Barbool's Wife
- Stojan 'Stole' Arandjelovic as Barbulovic 'Barbool'(as Stole Arandjelovic)
- Boris Dvornik as Vozac kamiona

== Reception ==
In a 1974 review, Vincent Canby described it as "by far the most original, intelligent, witty and important film I've seen so far this year," and "the most sophisticated and complex film from a Communist country that I've ever seen."

John Simon wrote that "Man is not a Bird was a harsh, realistic film, containing some fairly daring sexual interludes for its country and its time".

On the review aggregator website Rotten Tomatoes, 100% of 5 critics' reviews are positive, with an average rating of 7.4/10.
