= Stole Aranđelović =

Serbian actor

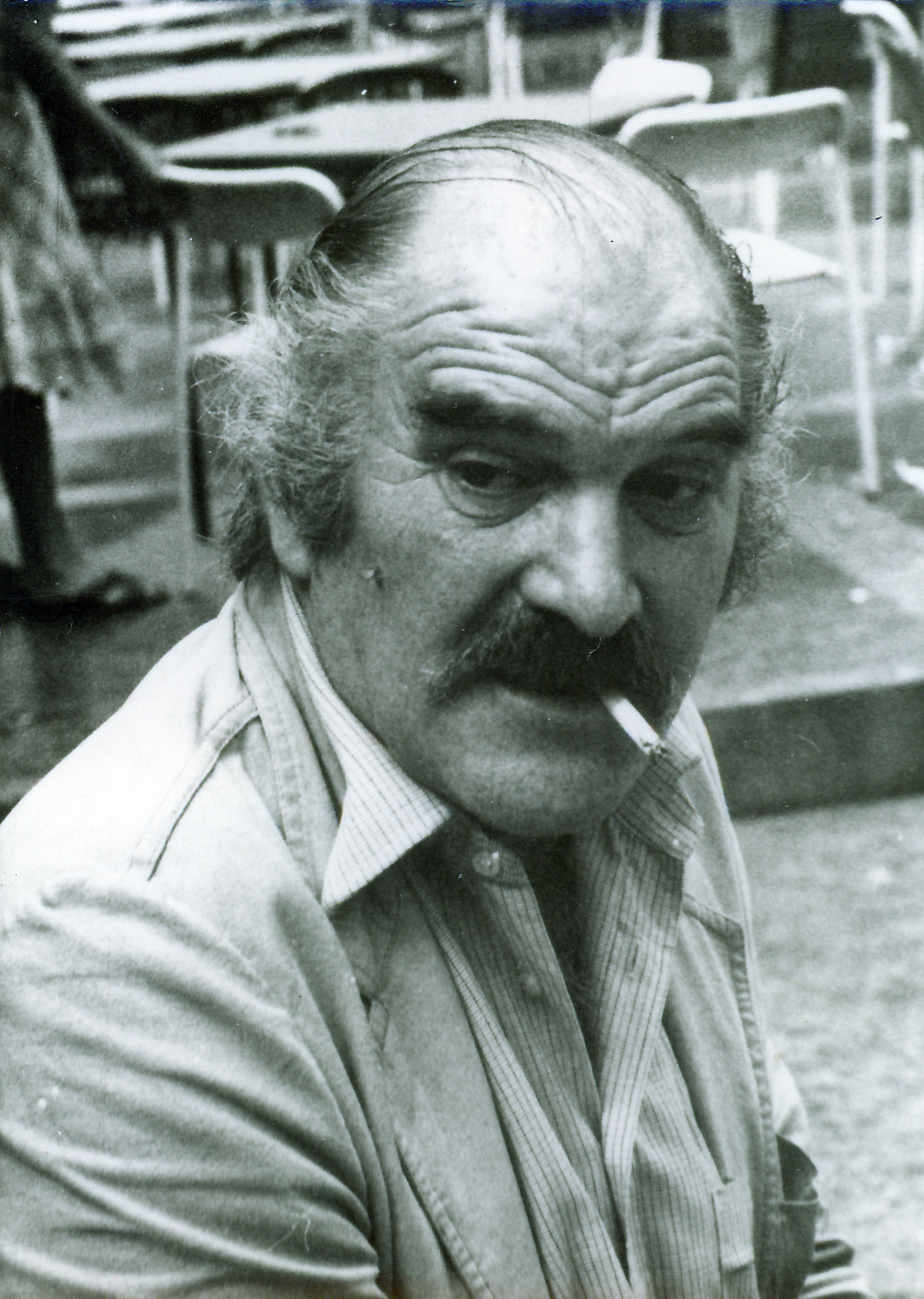
- Aranđelović in 1984
- Born: 12 June 1930; Belgrade, Kingdom of Yugoslavia
- Died: 8 April 1993 (aged 62); Belgrade, FR Yugoslavia
- Occupation: Actor
- Years active: 1955–1993

Stojan "Stole" Aranđelović (12 June 1930 – 8 April 1993) was a Serbian film actor. He appeared in 120 films between 1955 and 1993.

He was born and died in Belgrade, Yugoslavia.

== Selected filmography ==
- Crveni cvet (1950) - Oficir
- Pesma sa Kumbare (1955) - Marko
- Solaja (1955) - Kolesko
- Djevojka i hrast (1955) - Petar ... Ivanov brat
- Potraga (1956) - Zarko ... radnik u stampariji
- Michel Strogoff (1956) - Tatar soldat (uncredited)
- Zenica (1957) - Hasan
- Mali covek (1957)
- Rafal u nebo (1958)
- Oleko Dundich (1958) - Rasovic
- The Sky Through the Trees (1958) - Tifusar
- Tempest (1958) - Peasant (uncredited)
- Train Without a Timetable (1959) - Lovre
- Point 905 (1960) - Gavran
- Partizanske price (1960) - (segment "Povratak")
- Bolje je umeti (1960)
- Nebeski odred (1961)
- Ne diraj u srecu (1961)
- The Steppe (1962) - Kiriuka
- Kapi, vode, ratnici (1962) - (segment "Mali skver")
- Double Circle (1963) - Dugi
- Zemljaci (1963)
- U sukobu (1963)
- Grad (1963) - Covek (segment "Obruc")
- Freddy in the Wild West (1964) - Perkins Henchman #1
- Last of the Renegades (1964) - Caesar
- Amongst Vultures (1964) - Milton
- Sette a Tebe (1964)
- Man Is Not a Bird (1965) - Barbulovic 'Barbool'
- Three (1965) - Zeka ... verski fanatik
- Klakson (1965) - Lugar
- The Oil Prince (1965) - Bandit (uncredited)
- Neprijatelj (1965)
- Konjuh planinom (1966) - Rudar
- Roj (1966)
- The Dream (1966)
- Povratak (1966) - Stole
- Tople godine (1966)
- Glineni golub (1966) - Bosko
- Palma medju palmama (1967) - Suri
- Playing Soldiers (1967) - Jagos
- Brat doktora Homera (1968) - Kurtes
- Lelejska gora (1968) - Kosto Amerika
- Operacija Beograd (1968) - Invalid Luka
- It Rains in My Village (1968) - Kondukter u vozu
- Sunce tudjeg neba (1968) - Nikola
- Battle of Neretva (1969) - Sumadinac
- The Role of My Family in the Revolution (1971)
- Ovcar (1971) - Skeledzija
- Makedonski del od pekolot (1971) - Bugarski vojnik
- Bronte: cronaca di un massacro che i libri di storia non hanno raccontato (1972) - Calogero Gasparazzo
- Life of a Shock Force Worker (1972)
- Battle of Sutjeska (1973) - Pop
- So (1973)
- Scalawag (1973) - Beanbelly
- Doktor Mladen (1975) - Svestenik
- Pavle Pavlovic (1975) - Pavlov brat
- Anno Domini 1573 (1975) - Petrov stric
- Naivko (1975) - Vesko
- Salas u Malom Ritu (1976) - Skeledzija
- Cetiri dana do smrti (1976)
- Vojnikova ljubav (1976)
- Povratak otpisanih (1976) - Isa
- Ispravi se, Delfina (1977) - Stariot trener na francuskata obala
- Trofej (1979) - Lukac
- Pozorisna veza (1980) - Velja
- Crveniot konj (1981) - Nikola
- Sesta brzina (1981) - Carinik Blagota
- The Falcon (1981) - Pop Gradislav
- Zalazak sunca (1982) - Opat
- Twilight Time (1982) - Matan
- Zadah tela (1983) - Milkin otac
- Kamiondzije opet voze (1984) - Truman
- Vojnici (1984) - Zastavnik Desimir Markovic
- Kraj rata (1984) - Vlasnik kafane
- Sest dana juna (1985) - Milicionar 1
- Na putu za Katangu (1987) - Grgur
- The Dark Side of the Sun (1988 - released in 1997) - Vidar (the healer)
- Jednog lepog dana (1988) - Velja
- Seobe (1989)
- Coprnica Zofka (1989) - (Serbian version, voice)
- Poltron (1989) - Zoricin otac
- Zena s krajolikom (1989) - Sumar
- Vreme cuda (1989) - Slepac
- Uros blesavi (1989)
- Granica (1990) - Nikola Topic
- Noc u kuci moje majke (1991) - Ozren
- Tetoviranje (1991) - Majstor
- Tri karte za Hollywood (1993) - Nosac
- Obracun u kazino kabareu (1993) - Covek sa puskom (final film role)

== See also ==
- Cinema of Yugoslavia
