= Destination Death =

1964 film

- Film poster
- Directed by: Wolfgang Staudte
- Written by: Arsen Diklic; Werner Jörg Lüddecke; Wolfgang Staudte
- Produced by: Rüdiger von Hirschberg
- Starring: Götz George
- Cinematography: Nenad Jovicic
- Edited by: Carl Otto Bartning
- Music by: Zoran Hristić
- Release date: 27 February 1964
- Running time: 92 minutes
- Countries: West Germany; Yugoslavia
- Languages: German; Serbo-Croatian

Destination Death (German: Herrenpartie, Serbian: Мушки излет, romanized: Muški izlet) is a 1964 West German-Yugoslavian war film directed by Wolfgang Staudte. It was entered into the 14th Berlin International Film Festival.

== Cast ==
- Götz George as Herbert Hackländer
- Hans Nielsen as Major a. D. Friedrich Hackländer
- Rudolf Platte as Werner Drexel
- Reinhold Bernt as Willi Wirth
- Gerlach Fiedler as Otmar Wengel
- Gerhard Hartig as Kurt Siebert
- Friedrich Maurer as Studienrat Karl Samuth
- Herbert Tiede as Inspektor Ernst Sobotka
- Mira Stupica as Miroslava
- Olivera Marković as Lia
- Milena Dravić as Seja
- Ljubica Janicijević as Nada
- Nevenka Benković
- Pavle Vujisić as Nikola Kelner
