= Vera Čukić =

Serbian actress

- Вера Чукић
- Born: 16 December 1938 (age 87); Belgrade, Kingdom of Yugoslavia
- Occupation: Actress
- Years active: 1958–present
- Spouse: Gordan Mihić
- Children: Ivana Mihić

Vera Čukić (Serbian Cyrillic: Вера Чукић; born 16 December 1938) is a Serbian actress. She appeared in more than sixty films since 1958.

== Selected filmography ==
Year	Title	Role	Notes
1988	Zaboravljeni		
1978	The Tiger	Barbarela	
1968	I Have Two Mothers and Two Fathers		
1967	The Knife	Ana Vagner	
1967	Macedonian Blood Wedding		
1958	The Sky Through the Trees		
