= Milena Dravić =

Serbian actress (1940–2018)

- Милена Дравић
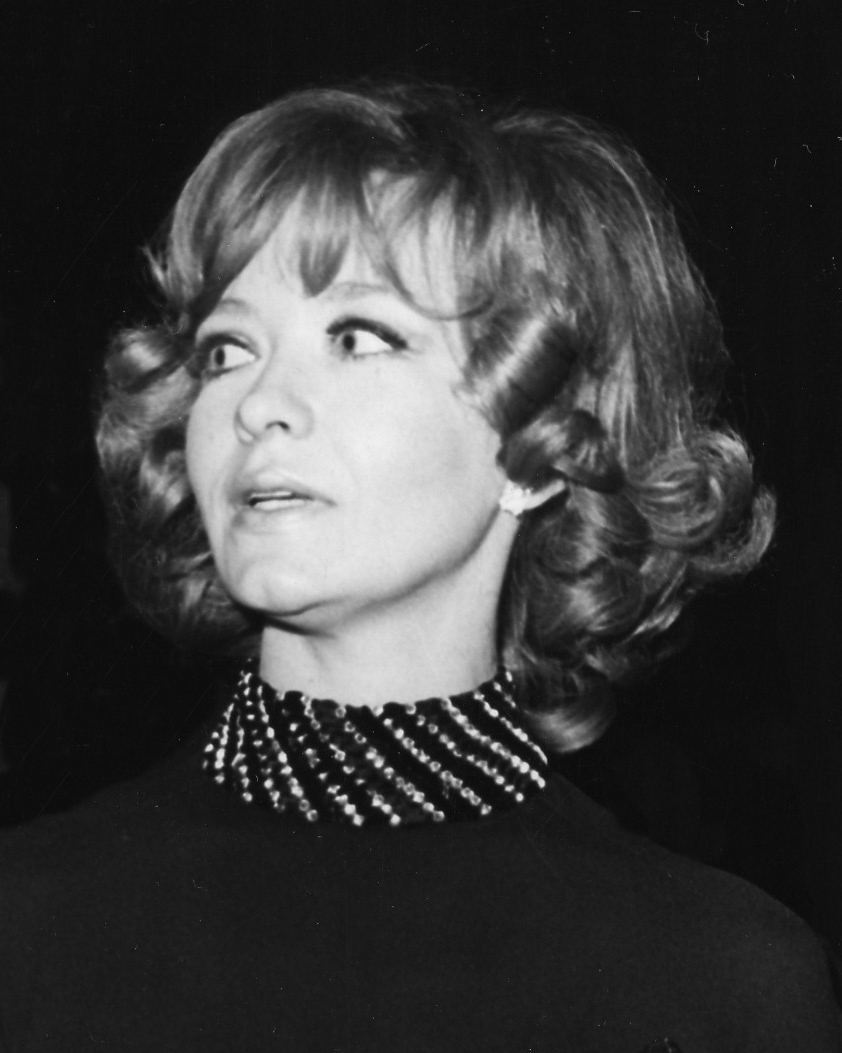
- Dravić pictured in 1969
- Born: 5 October 1940; Belgrade, Kingdom of Yugoslavia
- Died: 14 October 2018 (aged 78); Belgrade, Serbia
- Education: Faculty of Dramatic Arts, University of Arts in Belgrade
- Occupation: Actress
- Years active: 1958–2018
- Spouses: Puriša Đorđević (m. 1960; div. 1961) Kokan Rakonjac (m. 1967; died 1969) Dragan Nikolić (m. 1971; died 2016)

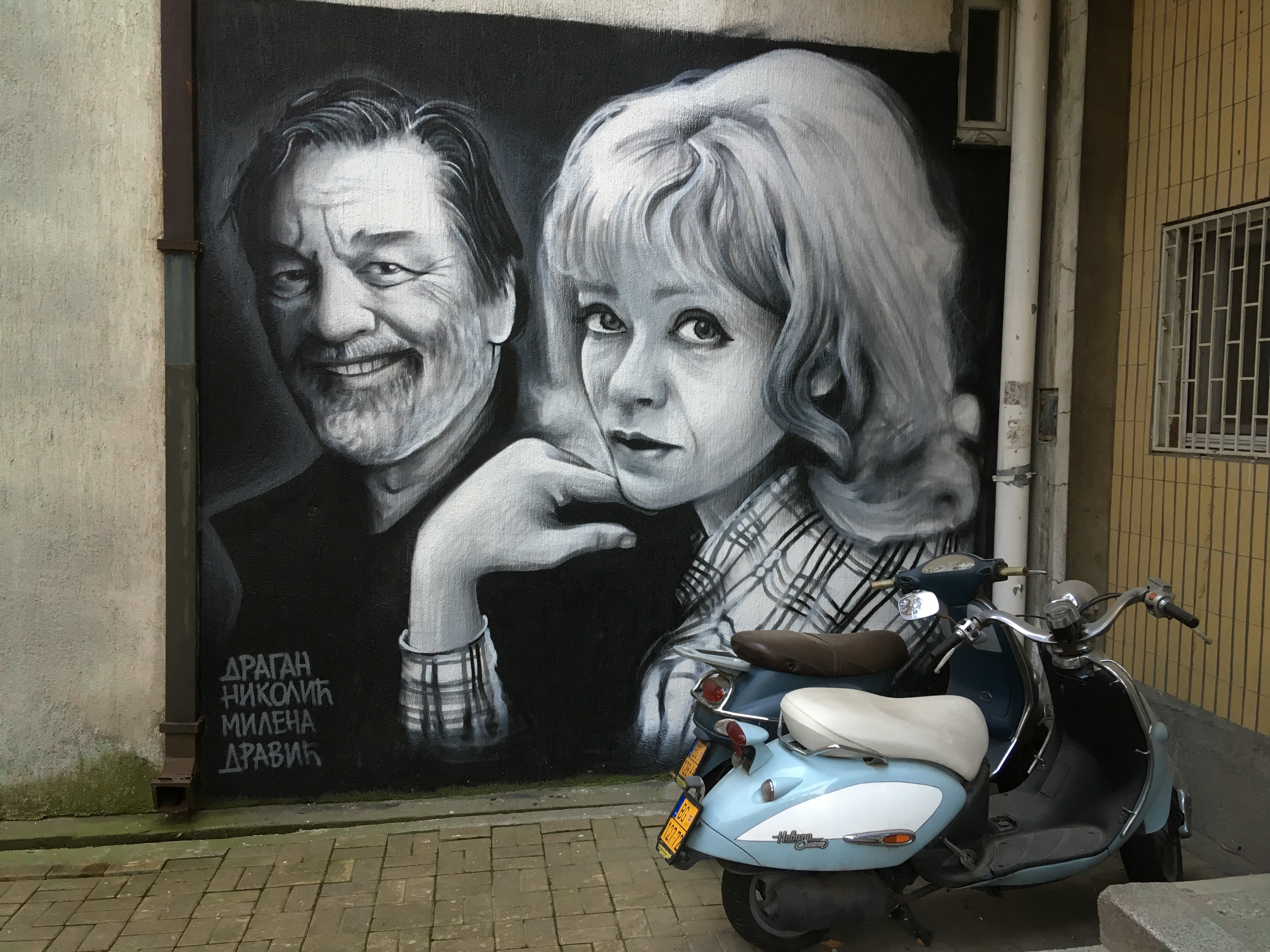
Dragan Nikolić & Milena Dravić mural, Vračar, Nevesinjska 11

Milena Dravić (Serbian Cyrillic: Милена Дравић, pronounced [mîlena drǎːvitɕ]; 5 October 1940 – 14 October 2018) was a Yugoslavian and Serbian film, television and theatre actress.

== Biography ==
Born in Belgrade, Serbia, Dravić became involved with performing arts at the age of four via her parents enrolling her in a dance program. She would later switch to classical ballet.

In 1959, still a high school student, Dravić got spotted by director František Čáp who approached the eighteen-year-old about being in his film Vrata ostaju otvorena after seeing her on the cover of a youth magazine in a ballet dancers' group photo. After appearing in a few more films, she decided to pursue acting full-time and to that end successfully enrolled at the Academy of Theatre Arts (APU) within the Arts Academy in Belgrade.

Her big break came in 1962 in Branko Bauer's Prekobrojna for which she won the Golden Arena for Best Actress (Yugoslav equivalent of an Academy Award). She was a recipient of five Silver arenas (for supporting actress roles) and 2 Golden arenas (for leading actress roles).

She received various awards and accolades over her career, such as the Cannes Best Supporting Actress Award in 1980 for Special Treatment, the Pavle Vujisić Award in August 1994, and the Dobričin prsten lifetime achievement award in Belgrade.

== Personal life ==
Dravić was married three times. Her third husband was the prominent Serbian actor Dragan Nikolić, with whom she had co-hosted the popular 1970s television program Obraz uz obraz.

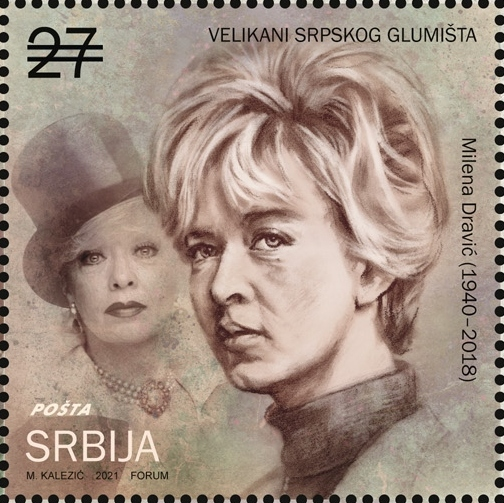
Dravić on a 2021 stamp of Serbia

== Death ==
She died on 14 October 2018 from an undisclosed illness.

== Selected filmography ==
- Vrata ostaju otvorena (1959) – Marija ... Petrova sestra
- Dilizansa snova (1960) – Evica
- Zajednicki stan (1960) – Ljubica
- Bolje je umeti (1960) – Jola
- The First Fires (1961) – Hajra
- Leto je krivo za sve (1961) – Natalija
- Kozara (1962) – Milja
- Prekobrojna (1962) – Ranka
- Pesceni grad (1962) – Milena
- Radopolje (1963) – Mrvica
- Destination Death (1964) – Seja
- Sluzbeni polozaj (1964) – Zora
- Lito vilovito (1964) – Mare
- Narodni poslanik (1964) – Danica
- Man is Not a Bird (1965) – Rajka
- Devojka (1965) – Devojka
- Klakson (1965) – Jana
- Covik od svita (1965) – Visnja
- The Camp Followers (1965) – Aspasia Anastasiou
- Rondo (1966) – Neda
- Do pobedata i po nea (1966) – Momata
- Looking Into the Eyes of the Sun (1966)
- Sticenik (1966) – Herself
- Zgodba ki je ni (1967) – Uciteljica
- Nemirni (1967) – Zorica
- The Morning (1967) – Aleksandra
- Dim (1967) – Devojka
- Hasanaginica (1967) – Hasanaginica
- Sirota Marija (1968) – Marija
- Sedmina (1969) – Filomena
- Zaseda (1969) – Milica
- Horoskop (1969) – Milka
- Cross Country (1969) – Jovana
- The Battle of Neretva (1969) – Nada
- Biciklisti (1970) – Sara
- Touha zvaná Anada (1971) – Zuzka
- W.R.: Mysteries of the Organism (1971) – Milena
- The Role of My Family in the Revolution (1971) – Devojka
- Makedonski del od pekolot (1971) – Velika
- Ko pride lev (1972) – Mihaela
- The Battle of Sutjeska (1973) – Vera
- Pjegava djevojka (1973) – Katy
- Samrtno prolece (1973) – Veronika Djakovic
- Deps (1974) – Depsova djevojka Janja
- A Performance of Hamlet in the Village of Mrdusa Donja (1974) – Andja / Ofelija
- Strah (1974) – Karolina
- Pavle Pavlovic (1975) – Adela
- Povratak otpisanih (1976) – Lula Mitricevic
- Izvinjavamo se, mnogo se izvinjavamo (1976) - Borka
- Group Portrait with a Lady (1977) – Schwester Klementine
- Ljubavni zivot Budimira Trajkovica (1977) – Lepa Trajkovic
- Tamo i natrag (1978) – Rada Jovanovic
- Kvar (1978) – Sasina ljubavnica
- Trener (1978) – Petrova bivsa zena
- Povratak (1979) – Roza
- Special Treatment (1980) – Kaca
- Osam kila srece (1980)
- Rad na odredjeno vreme (1980) – Svetlana
- Snovi, zivot, smrt Filipa Filipovica (1980)
- Sesta brzina (1981) – Gvozdenka
- Laf u srcu (1981) – Savina zena
- Nedeljni rucak (1982) – Sofija Arandjelovic
- Moj tata na odredjeno vreme (1982) – Svetlana
- Covek sa cetiri noge (1983) – Nada Jovanovic
- Secerna vodica (1983) – Ana
- Una (1984) – Miselova zena
- Horvat’s Choice (1985) – Marijana Margitic
- Nije lako sa muskarcima (1985) – Gordana Diklic
- Anticasanova (1985) – Asja
- Na istarski nacin (1985)
- Osveta (1986) – Nada Pekar
- Razvod na odredjeno vreme (1986) – Svetlana Milanovic
- Lijepe zene prolaze kroz grad (1986) – Rahela
- Dogodilo se na danasnji dan (1987) – Nastavnica
- Cavka (1988) – Nastavnica
- The Dark Side of the Sun (1988) – Mother
- Spijun na stiklama (1988) – Livadinka Kukuric
- Najbolji (1989) – Ninkova majka
- Battle of Kosovo (1989) – Velislava
- Cudna noc (1990)
- Sekula se opet zeni (1991) – Sojka
- Policajac sa Petlovog brda (1992) – Vera
- Treca sreca (1995) – Prorocica Antilopa
- Three Summer Days (1997) – Kaja
- Cabaret Balkan (1998) – The Lady on the Bus with the Hat and Fox Stole
- Sky Hook (2000) – Danka
- Normalni ljudi (2001) – Tomina tetka
- Boomerang (2001) – Gospodja Jeftic
- Zona Zamfirova (2002) – Tasana
- Ledina (2003) – Zorica
- Sjaj u ocima (2003) – Vlasnica agencije
- Lost and Found (2005) – Vera (segment "Fabulous Vera")
- Agi i Ema (2007) – Ema
- Crazy, Confused, Normal (2007–2015, TV Series) – Spomenka Vihorec
- Love and Other Crimes (2008) – Majka
- St. George Shoots the Dragon (2009) – Tetka Slavka
- The village is burning, and the grandmother is combing her hair (2009, TV Series) – Direktorka banke
