= Janez Vrhovec =

Serbian actor (1921–1997)

- Born: 19 January 1921; Belgrade, Kingdom of Serbs, Croats, and Slovenes
- Died: 7 October 1997 (aged 76); Belgrade, FR Yugoslavia
- Occupation: Actor
- Years active: 1950–1997

Janez Vrhovec (19 January 1921 – 7 October 1997) was a Yugoslav actor of Slovenian-German origin. Vrhovec appeared in a number of Yugoslav and Serbian films, as well as many international productions, in a career spanning almost five decades.

== Selected filmography ==
- Austerlitz (1959)
- Perfidy (Nevjera, 1953)
- The Last Bridge (Die Letzte Brücke, 1954)
- The Fourteenth Day (Dan četrnaesti, 1960)
- Atomic War Bride (Rat, 1960)
- Love and Fashion (Ljubav i moda, 1960)
- Enclosure (L'Enclos, 1961)
- The Triumph of Robin Hood (1962)
- Prometheus of the Island (Prometej s otoka Viševice, 1964)
- Freddy in the Wild West (1964)
- The Shoot (1964)
- Man Is Not a Bird (1965)
- Eneide (1971)
- I Even Met Happy Gypsies (Skupljači perja, 1967)
- Gates to Paradise (1968)
- Beach Guard in Winter (Čuvar plaže u zimskom periodu, 1976)
- The Falcon (Banović Strahinja, 1983)
- The Secret Diary of Sigmund Freud (1984)
- Der Sonne entgegen (1985, TV series)
