= Mira Banjac =

Serbian actress

- Мира Бањац
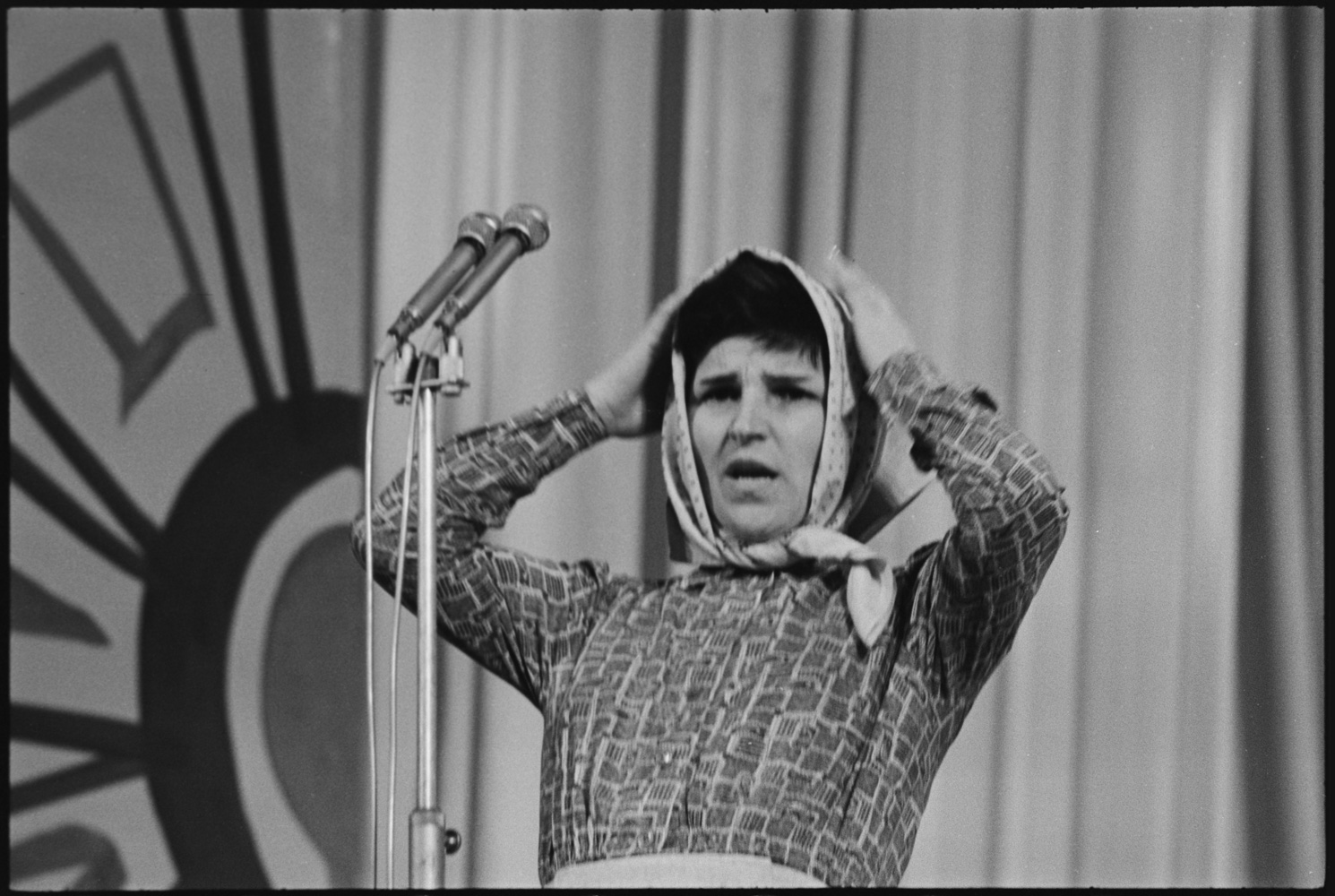
- Banjac in the 1960s
- Born: Mirjana Banjac; 4 November 1929 (age 96); Erdevik, Šid, Kingdom of Yugoslavia
- Education: Academy of Arts
- Alma mater: University of Novi Sad
- Occupation: Actress
- Years active: 1949–present
- Children: 1

Mira Banjac (Serbian Cyrillic: Мира Бањац; born 4 November 1929) is a Serbian actress.

She won a number of awards, including an award for her work in Mamaroš from Brazil and Golden Medal for Merits of Republic of Serbia.

== Personal life ==
Banjac was married to architect Andrej Jovanović. In 1951, they had a son, Branislav. Branislav died on 6 February 2025 at the age of 74 from a short illness.

== Selected filmography ==
- Beach Guard in Winter (1976)
- Do You Remember Dolly Bell? (1981)
- The Elusive Summer of '68 (1984)
- 72 Days (2010)
- When Day Breaks (2012)
- Mamaroš (2013)
- The High Sun (2015)
- Requiem for Mrs. J. (2017)
