= Neda Arnerić =

Serbian film, stage and television actress, and politician (1953–2020)

- Неда Арнерић
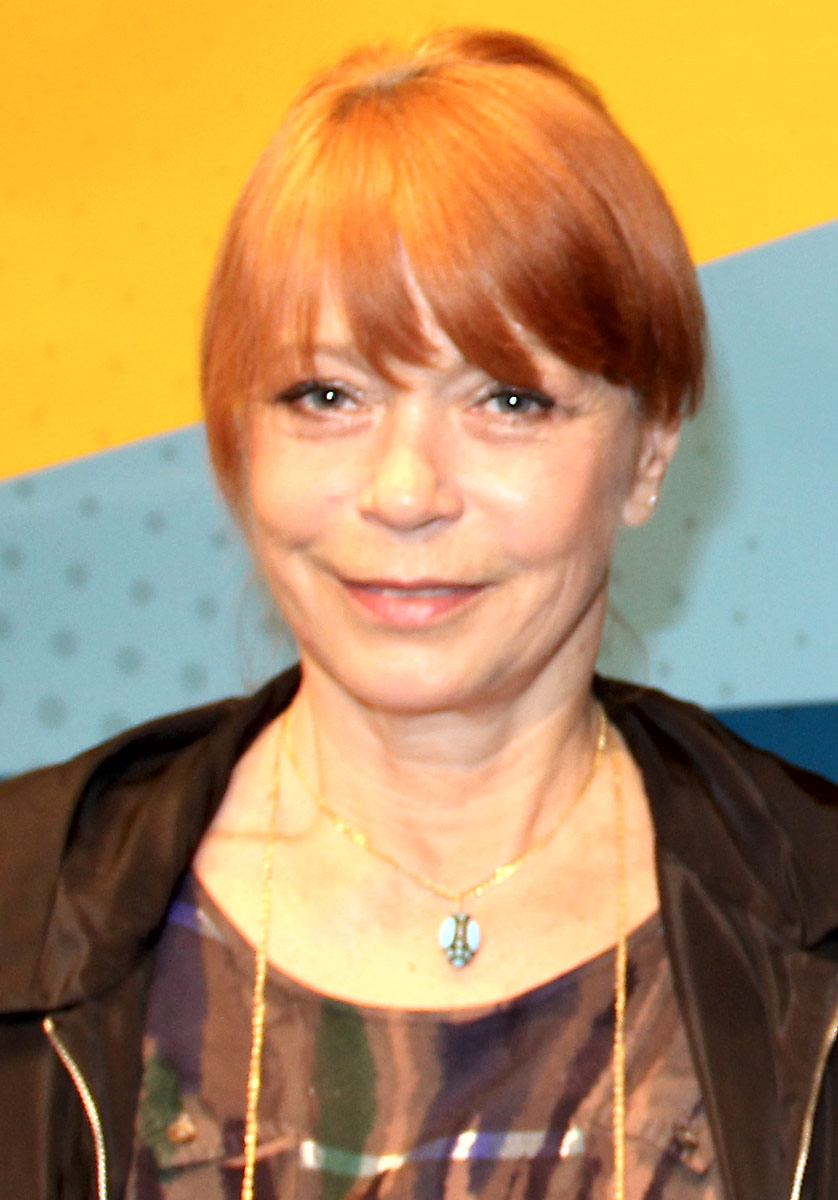
- Arnerić pictured in February 2012
- Born: 15 July 1953; Knjaževac, PR Serbia, FPR Yugoslavia
- Died: 10 January 2020 (aged 66); Belgrade, Serbia
- Education: University of Belgrade
- Occupation: Actress
- Years active: 1966–2020
- Spouse: Milorad Mešterović (m. 1983; died 2018)

Neda Arnerić (Serbian Cyrillic: Неда Арнерић; 15 July 1953 – 10 January 2020) was a Serbian film, stage and television actress, and politician. A graduate art historian, she was considered a sex symbol of Yugoslav cinematography.

== Personal life ==
Neda Arnerić was born in Knjaževac. Her mother was an ethnic Serb, whilst her father was an ethnic Croat, who worked as military doctor, born on the island of Korčula. Her grandfather was from Rovinj, where she often spent summers.

In 1980 she graduated from the University of Belgrade Faculty of Philosophy with a degree in Art History. In 1981 she married Serbian physician, Milorad Mešterović, who died in December 2018. They had no children.

In February 2019, her brother Predrag found her unconscious, after which she spent forty days at the Military Medical Academy in Belgrade. On 10 January 2020, she died aged 66. Her brother found her dead in her own home in the Belgrade municipality of Vračar, where she is believed to have suffered a heart attack.

== Selected filmography ==
- Venom (a.k.a. The Legend of Spider Forest) (1971)
- Shaft in Africa (1973)
- The Republic of Užice (1974)
- The Sensual Man (1974)
- Erotomania (1974)
- Who's That Singing Over There (1980)
- The Elusive Summer of '68 (1984)
- The End of the War (1984)
- Taiwan Canasta (1985)
- Aloa: Festivity of the Whores (1988)
- Three Tickets to Hollywood (1993)
- Impure Blood (1996)
- Wheels (1998)
- Natasha (2001)
