= Mladomir Puriša Đorđević =

Serbian film director (1924–2022)

- Born: 6 May 1924; Čačak, Kingdom of Serbs, Croats and Slovenes
- Died: 23 November 2022 (aged 98); Belgrade, Serbia
- Occupations: Film director Screenwriter
- Years active: 1947–2022

Mladomir Puriša Đorđević (Serbian Cyrillic: Младомир Пуриша Ђорђевић; 6 May 1924 – 23 November 2022) was a Serbian film director and screenwriter.

== Biography ==
He directed 71 films since 1947. His 1966 film The Dream was entered into the 17th Berlin International Film Festival. Some of his movies were censored and banned by the Yugoslav communist government.

Đorđević died on 23 November 2022, at the age of 98.

== Selected filmography ==
- Girl (1965)
- The Dream (1966)
- The Morning (1967)
- Noon (1968)
