= Ljubiša Samardžić =

Serbian actor and director (1936–2017)

- Љубиша Самарџић
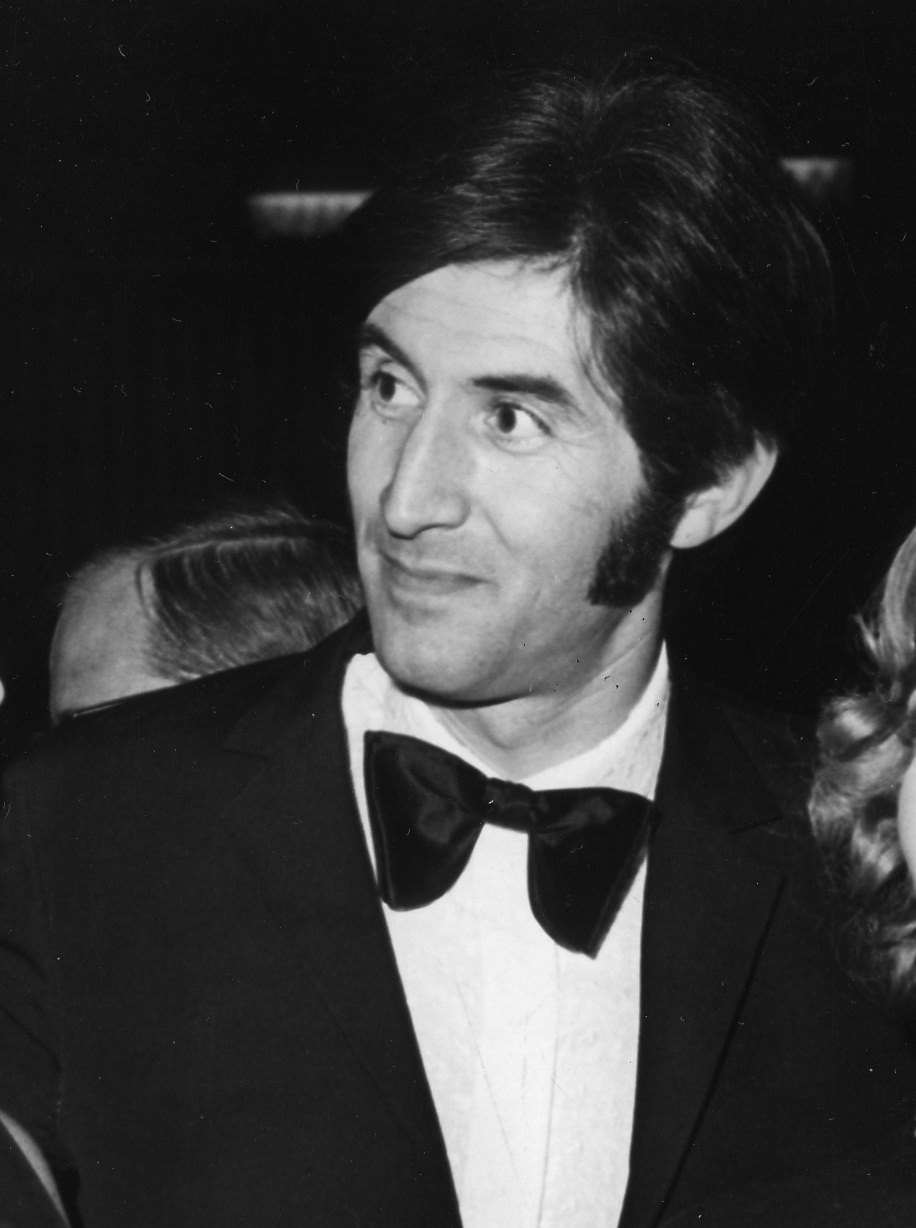
- Samardžić at the Battle of Neretva premiere in Sarajevo in November 1969.
- Born: 19 November 1936; Skopje, Kingdom of Yugoslavia
- Died: 8 September 2017 (aged 80); Belgrade, Serbia
- Other names: Luba Samardy, Smoki
- Occupation: Actor
- Spouse: Mirjana Samardžić (m. 1966–2017)

Ljubiša Samardžić (Serbian Cyrillic: Љубиша Самарџић; 19 November 1936 – 8 September 2017), nicknamed Smoki, was a Serbian actor and director, best known as Šurda in the Vruć vetar TV series, and Inspector Boško Simić in the comedy crime series Policajac sa Petlovog brda (The Policeman from Petlovo Brdo) and film of the same name.

== Early life ==
Samardžić was born in Skopje, the son of an impoverished coal miner born in Krivošije (in Montenegro) and a mother from Kosovo. His parents met in Priština. He grew up in the village of Jelašnica near Niška Banja, where his father Dragoljub (died 1948) also worked in the local mine. He finished gymnasium in Niš.

His acting talent was discovered very early and he won a scholarship with director Bojan Stupica. Samardžić was educated at the Belgrade Academy of Arts. After graduation, he obtained a role in Igre na skelama (1961).

== Career ==
In the 1960s, he established himself as one of the most recognisable actors of former Yugoslav cinema.

He was married to Mirjana Samardžić since 1966. Nicknamed Smoki, he was credited as Ljubisa Samardjic, Luba Samardy, Ljubisa Samardzic-Smoki, and Smoki Samardì.

In the 1990s, he and his son, Dragan, founded a film production company. Despite the break-up of Yugoslavia and UN sanctions against Yugoslavia, the company made many popular and commercial successful films. He starred in over 180 films.

== Awards ==
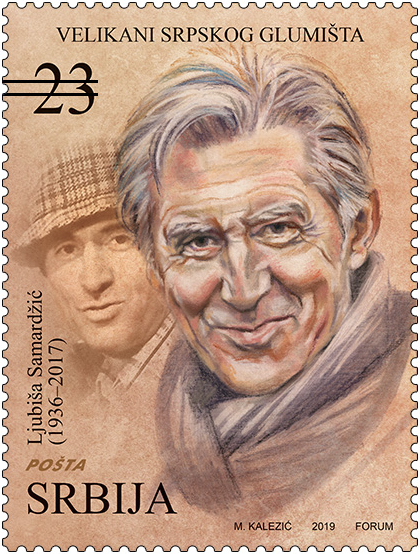
Samardžić on a 2019 stamp of Serbia

Samardžić received six Golden Arenas at the Pula Film Festival, and numerous awards at Italian film festivals.

As a director, his movies were awarded with the Grand Prix at Montpellier, the Public Award at Palm Springs, and Opera Prima at the Milan Film Festival. In August 1995, he received Life Achievement Award "Pavle Vujisić" for his roles in Yugoslav cinematography.

== Selected filmography ==
=== Actor ===
- Igre na skelama (1961) - Gvardijan
- Kozara (1962) - Mitar
- Prekobrojna (1962) - Mikajlo
- Pesceni grad (1962) - Smoki
- Dani (1963) - Dragan
- Desant na Drvar (1963) - Milan
- Lito vilovito (1964) - Vice
- Devojka (1965) - Vojnik
- Inspektor (1965) - Borivoje Jovanovic
- Po isti poti se ne vracaj (1965) - Abdul
- Orlovi rano lete (1966) - Nikoletina Bursac
- The Climber (1966) - Ivan Stojanovic
- The Dream (1966) - Mali
- The Knife (1967) - Markov pomocnik
- Jutro (1967) - Mali
- Bokseri idu u raj (1967) - Reum
- Diverzanti (1967) - Sarac
- Sirota Marija (1968) - Vojislav
- U raskoraku (1968)
- Podne (1968) - Ljubisa
- Goli covjek (1968) - Spiro
- Operacija Beograd (1968) - Jasa (voice, uncredited)
- Battle of Neretva (1969) - Novak
- Ubistvo na svirep i podmukao nacin i iz niskih pobuda (1969) - Himself (uncredited)
- X + YY: Formel des Bösen (1970)
- Siroma' sam al' sam besan (1970) - Sava Kekic
- Biciklisti (1970) - Vitomir
- Zarki (1970)
- In Love, Every Pleasure Has Its Pain (1971) - Zilio
- Walter Defends Sarajevo (1972) - Zis
- Deveto cudo na istoku (1972) - Tomislav Brodarac
- Battle of Sutjeska (1973) - Stanojlo ... topdzija s konjem
- Bombasi (1973) - Kovac
- A Performance of Hamlet in the Village of Mrdusa Donja (1974) - Macak
- Hajdúk (1975)
- Cudoviti prah (1975)
- Doktor Mladen (1975) - Stanisa
- Crvena zemlja (1975) - Kosta
- Naivko (1975) - Buzga Mirocki
- Bele trave (1976)
- Special Education (1977) - Milicioner Cane
- Ljubavni zivot Budimira Trajkovica (1977) - Vojislav Voja Trajkovic
- Lude godine (1977) - Dr. Lazovic
- Tamo i natrag (1978) - Sava
- Stici pre svitanja (1978) - Kosta
- Bosko Buha (1978) - Milun
- The Tiger (1978) - Sorga 'Tigar'
- Partizanska eskadrila (1979) - Zare
- Vruć vetar (1980, TV Series) - Borivoje Surdilovic 'Surda'
- Avanture Borivoja Surdilovica (1980) - Borivoje Surdilovic - Surda
- Neka druga zena (1981) - Gvozden
- Visoki napon (1981) - Ivo Goreta
- Siroko je lisce (1981) - Marko
- Gosti iz galaksije (1981) - Toni
- Kraljevski voz (1981) - Tole
- Dvije polovine srca (1982) - Otac
- Smrt gospodina Goluze (1982) - Goluza
- Savamala (1982) - Lampas
- Moj tata na odredjeno vreme (1982) - Sinisa Pantic
- Medeni mjesec (1983) - Rajko
- Timocka buna (1983) - Lazar ... ucitelj
- Secerna vodica (1983) - Fotograf
- Maturanti (Pazi sta radis) (1984) - Profesor Plavsic
- Jaguarov skok (1984) - Bogdan
- Orkestar jedne mladosti (1985)
- Nije lako sa muskarcima (1985) - Ivan Sekulovic
- Zivot je lep (1985) - Valentino, kelner
- Anticasanova (1985) - Stipe
- Dancing in Water (1985) - Glenn's father
- Protestni album (1986) - Pasa
- Razvod na odredjeno vreme (1986) - Sinisa Pantic
- Dobrovoljci (1986) - Kelner
- Andjeo cuvar (1987) - Dragan
- Na putu za Katangu (1987) - Tosa Palidrvce
- Lager Nis (1987) - Kole Kockar
- Zivela svoboda! (1987) - Komandant
- Vanbracna putovanja (1988) - Kapetan Tadic
- Kuca pored pruge (1988) - Stanisa
- Iskusavanje djavola (1989) - Postar Djoka
- Poltron (1989) - Miodrag Krtalic
- Seobe II (1989) - Trifun Isakovic
- Uros blesavi (1989) - Uros
- Noc u kuci moje majke (1991) - Sreten
- Mala (1991) - Zika Ajkula
- Policajac sa Petlovog brda (1992) - Bosko Simic
- Three Tickets to Hollywood (1993) - Limijer
- Kazi zasto me ostavi (1993) - Rade
- Magarece godine (1994) - Jovo 'Skandal'
- Premeditated Murder (1995) - Vidosav
- Jugofilm (1997) - Bora
- Strsljen (1998) - Profesor Lane Sekularac
- Tockovi (1998) - Vlasnik hotela
- Blues za Saro (1998) - Milivoj
- Natasa (2001) - Tosa (Natasin otac)
- Viza za budućnost (2002-2008, TV Series) - Milan Golijanin
- Yu (2003)
- Jesen stize, dunjo moja (2004) - Marijin otac
- Konji vrani (2007) - Deda
- Bledi mesec (2008) - Deda

=== Director ===
- Sky Hook (2000)
- Natasha (2001)
- Ledina (2003)
- Goose Feather (2004)
- Black Horses (2007)
- Pale Moon (2008)
- The Scent of Rain in the Balkans (2011)
