= Yugoslav Film Archive =

Film archives in Serbia

State Audiovisual Archives of Serbia – Yugoslav Film Archives
- Државни аудиовизуелни архив Србије – Југословенска кинотека
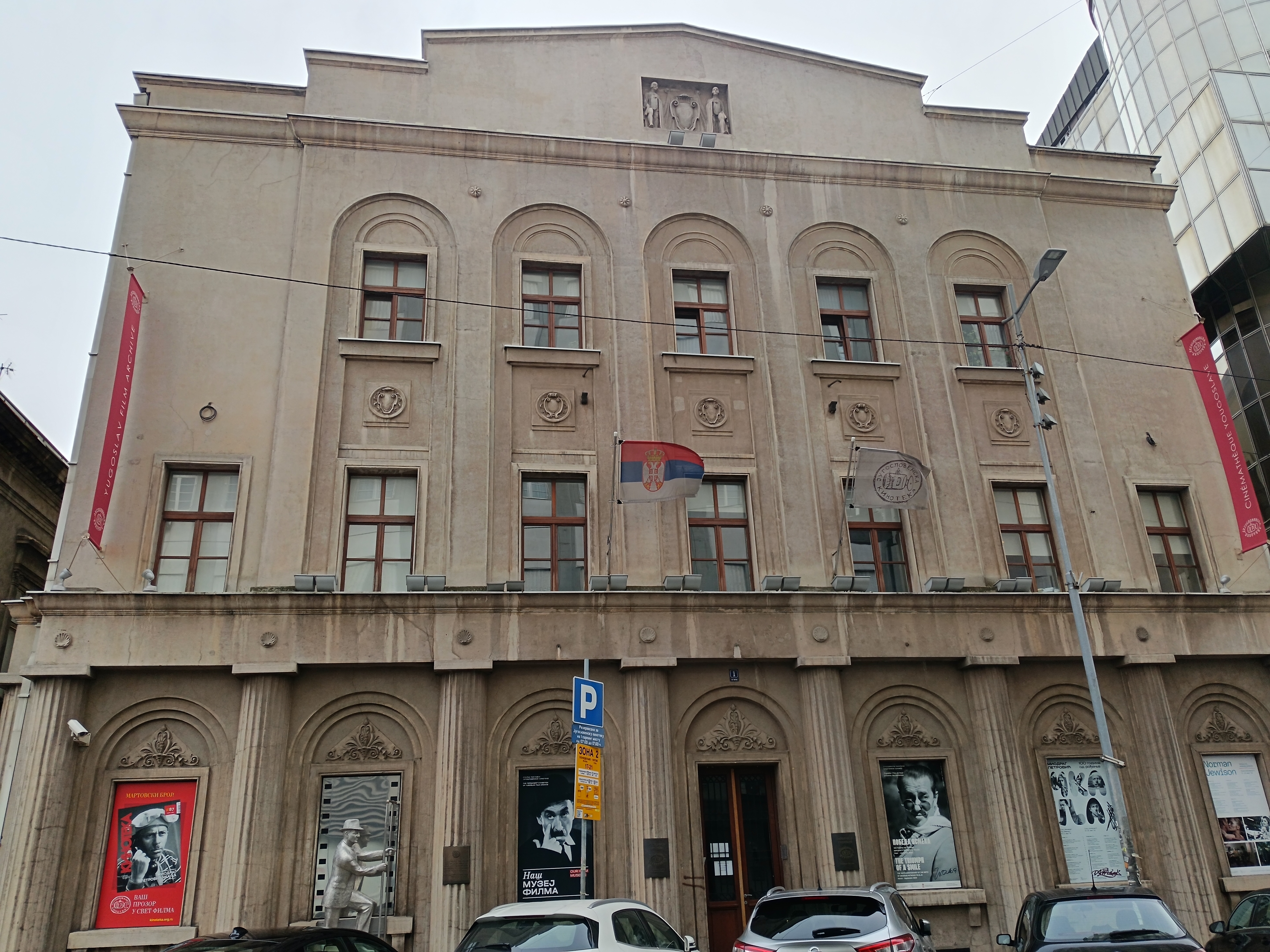
- Yugoslav Film Archives headquarters
- Established: 1949; 77 years ago
- Location: Belgrade, Serbia
- Coordinates: 44.8196475°N 20.4537418°E
- Type: Cinematheque

The State Audiovisual Archives of Serbia – Yugoslav Film Archives (Serbian: Државни аудиовизуелни архив Србије – Југословенска кинотека, romanized: Državni audiovizuelni arhiv Srbije – Jugoslovenska kinoteka) is a cinematheque located in Belgrade, Serbia. Founded in 1949 as the national film archives of the Yugoslavia it currently serves as the national film depository of Serbia. Тhe Yugoslav Cinematheque is among the 10 largest film archives in the world.

== History ==
The Yugoslav Cinematheque was founded by the Federal People's Republic of Yugoslavia's Committee for Cinema in 1949.

During the 1999 NATO bombing of Yugoslavia the archives collection was under threat, however, it was successfully saved. Italian director Bernardo Bertolucci penned a plea for the archives to be spared during the bombing.

After restoration, the new main building of the archives was officially opened in 2011 and in 2014 it was opened for the public.

== Collections ==
The film collections contain over 100,000 film prints of various national productions, of all genres, silent and sound, black & white and color, both nitrate and acetate. Around 85% of the entire film collection consists of foreign film material, including some previously considered lost, which makes the archive particularly interesting for film archivists and researchers from all over the world.

The Yugoslav Cinematheque saved the most important archival material and documentaries related to the territory of former Yugoslavia, starting from the oldest extant film in the country Coronation of King Peter the First from 1904 until its restoration in 1992. The collection of Yugoslav films includes more than 90% of production since the World War II. Most of the films have a copy protection (two copies per title). The film collections are constantly increasing deposit of films made and the placed in the country, sharing with other film archives, and through purchase and gifts from individuals and institutions.

The archival photographic collection contains approximately 250,000 identified (and as much unprocessed) images from local or foreign film productions, portraits of film workers and other participants in the film industry. Collection of documents and written film material contains all types of documents, letters, contracts, original scripts and other material relevant to the history and study of national cinema.

The archival collection contains posters of films (domestic and foreign productions) and movie festivals. The archives has processed about 15,000 posters and about 200,000 of unidentified and untreated material. Priority task is the protection of posters related to domestic films.

== See also ==
- List of archives in Serbia
- List of film archives
- Yugoslav Drama Theatre
- Museum of Yugoslavia
- Archives of Yugoslavia
