= Mija Aleksić =

Serbian actor

- Мија Алексић
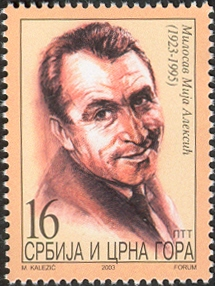
- Aleksić on a 2003 Serbian stamp
- Born: Milosav Aleksić; 26 September 1923; Gornja Crnuća, Kingdom of Serbs, Croats and Slovenes
- Died: 12 March 1995 (aged 71); Belgrade, Serbia, FR Yugoslavia
- Occupation: Actor
- Years active: 1950–1993

Milosav "Mija" Aleksić (Serbian Cyrillic: Милосав "Мија" Алексић; 26 September 1923 – 12 March 1995) was a Serbian actor.

== Early life ==
Aleksić was born in the Gornja Crnuća village within the municipality of Gornji Milanovac, Kingdom of Serbs, Croats and Slovenes. During World War II, when Axis powers occupied the Kingdom of Yugoslavia, 17-year-old Mija Aleksić attended high school in Kragujevac and on 21 October 1941, was one of the few young men and boys that avoided being executed by the Germans in the Kragujevac massacre.

== Career ==
Aleksić initially enrolled in law school. But he gradually discovered a talent for acting. From the end of the war till 1948 he worked in Kragujevac theatre. In September 1949, he transferred to the National Theatre in Belgrade and in 1951 he joined the Yugoslav Drama Theatre, where he would stay until 1965. He made his feature film debut in Opštinsko dete (1953) by Puriće Ćorđevič. Although notable for his drama talent, Aleksić is best known as a comedian. Additionally, he was one of the first actors in the Balkans whose career benefited from the new medium of television.

In the 1950s and 1960s, following the series of extremely popular sitcoms, he became one of the most popular entertainers of former Yugoslavia. Studio, the very first TV guide in history of the region, had his face on the cover its first issue in 1964. Popular TV sitcoms he appeared in include Servisna Stanica (Car repair station), Ogledalo gradjanina Pokornog (The mirror of the citizen Pokorny) and others. His role of Uncle Blagoje in the film Dr. won him the Golden Arena in Pula. In 1964, in addition to a series of light comedies, he got the role of the butcher Maksim in Čovek iz hrastove šume by Miša Popović. In the early 1970s, he played Jovana Micić in Put oko sveta, Jevrem Prokič in Narodni poslaniku, and Agathon in Očaločena porodija.

Aleksić had his own television show, Mija Show, and several episodes of this program have been preserved. He appeared in "Vaga za tačno merenje", an educational TV series for children. His popularity gradually declined, but he continued to work in the 1970s and 1980s. One of his last great roles was in the 1982 cult comedy The Marathon Family. In 1982, he received a Dobričin prsten, a significant acting award for his life's work. In 1990, he became the first recipient of the Branislav Nukic award for lifetime achievement for an actor-comedian. His last film was Tango Argentino for which he received the Grand Prix Award at the Niš festival. Aleksić died in Belgrade in 1995, aged 71.

== See also ==
- List of Yugoslavian films
