= Burduš =

- Directed by: Mića Popović
- Written by: Živorad Žika Lazić
- Starring: Jovan Janićijević Burduš; Milan Srdoč; Miodrag Andrić; Dragomir Bojanić Gidra; Miroslav Bijelić
- Edited by: Mihailo Ilić
- Music by: Dragan Tanić; Dragan Toković
- Production company: Avala film
- Release date: 1970
- Running time: 86 min
- Country: Yugoslavia
- Language: Serbo-Croatian

Burduš (Serbian Cyrillic: Бурдуш) is a 1970 Yugoslav film directed by Mića Popović and written by Živorad Žika Lazić.

The film is a continuation of the television series Muzikanti, with the character of Lepi Cane being portrayed by Dragan Zarić in the series, and Miodrag Andrić in the film.

Jovan Janićijević Burduš reprised the title role in the short film Burduš kondukter in 1972 and the TV series Neuništivi in 1989.

== Plot ==
Three poor musicians, Burduš, Rajko and Cane, suddenly become rich celebrities thanks to their participation in a television series. However, the unexpected success soon divides them. Burduš, lonely and lost, decides to go on a journey to find new friends, but he sees Rajko and Cane at a train station. They learn to overcome their differences and have fun once again.

== Cast ==
- Jovan Janićijević Burduš as Burduš
- Milan Srdoč as Rajko Životić
- Miodrag Andrić as Lepi Cane
- Dragomir Bojanić Gidra as Rade Lazić
- Miroslav Bijelić as Aca the Gypsy
- Mirjana Blašković
- Miroslava Bobić
- Boris Bunjac
- Ljubomir Ćipranić
- Rista Đorđević
- Ivan Đurđević
- Zorica Gajdaš
- Dušan Janicijević
- Ljubica Janićijević as Drina
- Miloš Kandić as Mića
- Ljubica Ković
- Petar Lupa
- Ivan Manojlović
- Rade Marković as doctor
- Adam Mitić
- Prvoslav Nikolić
- Bogoljub Novaković
- Bata Kameni
- Mira Peić
- Ljiljana Peros
- Slavoljub Plavšić Zvonce as Zvonce
- Radomir Popović
- Jelisaveta Sablić as Rajka Rajčić
- Ljiljana Šljapić as Barbara
- Živorad Šobić
- Danilo Bata Stojković as director
- Dušan Vuisić

== Trivia ==
The screenplay for the film was written by Živorad Žika Lazić, who is also mentioned in the film in the scene when Dragomir Bojanić Gidra introduces himself: "Rade Lazić, son of the late Žika Lazić, may God rest his soul, from the village of Lugavčina".
