= Time of Miracles =

1989 film

- Directed by: Goran Paskaljević
- Written by: Goran Paskaljević; Borislav Pekić
- Starring: Miki Manojlović; Dragan Maksimović; Danilo Stojković; Svetozar Cvetković; Mirjana Karanović; Mirjana Joković
- Cinematography: Radoslav Vladić
- Edited by: Olga Jovanović; Olga Skrigin
- Music by: Zoran Simjanović
- Production companies: Channel Four Television Corporation; Radio Television Belgrade
- Release date: 1989
- Running time: 98 minutes
- Country: Yugoslavia
- Language: Serbo-Croatian

Time of Miracles (Serbo-Croatian: Vreme čuda) is a 1989 Yugoslav drama film directed by Goran Paskaljević. The film was selected as the Yugoslav entry for the Best Foreign Language Film at the 63rd Academy Awards, but was not accepted as a nominee.

== Plot ==
The village of Bethany (modeled after the village that, according to the Bible, is located near Jerusalem where Lazarus was resurrected), September 1945, World War II has just ended. The new communist revolutionary government begins the fight against folk customs and beliefs and initiates the process of "exorcising God". The village school burned down in a fire, and the authorities break into the village church and drive out the priest. A revolutionary climbs the church and hangs the Communist flag on the cross . Other revolutionaries painted frescoes on the walls. However, after every attempt to whitewash the walls, the frescoes miraculously return. Communists perceive this act as a counter-revolutionary act. Soon the teacher dies and a stranger appears in the village.

A young man whom no one knows touches the hands of the deceased teacher on the scaffold, and raises him from the dead. The people begin to believe that Christ has arrived in their village and is performing miracles, while the communists declare the raising from the dead a counter-revolutionary act. The problem of the communists is now the teacher who rose from the dead, because the revolution does not believe in miracles. There is a conflict between two dogmas: the primitive interpretation of Communism and Christianity.

== Cast ==
- Miki Manojlović as Nikodim
- Dragan Maksimović as Lazar
- Mirjana Karanović as Marta
- Danilo Stojković as Jovan
- Svetozar Cvetković as Young Man
- Mirjana Joković as Marija
- Ljuba Tadić as Priest Luka
- Slobodan Ninković as Ozren
- Dušan Janićijević as Limping Man
- Stole Aranđelović as Blind Man
- Ljiljana Jovanović as Mihajlo's Wife
- Neda Arnerić as Priest's Wife
- Radmila Savićević as Old Woman
- Stojan Dečermić as Judge
- Dragomir Felba as Mihajlo
- Milan Pleština as Mihajlo's Son
- Olivera Viktorović as Stanija
- Tanja Maskareli-Ostojić as Mother

== See also ==
- List of submissions to the 63rd Academy Awards for Best Foreign Language Film
- List of Yugoslav submissions for the Academy Award for Best Foreign Language Film
