= The Swarm (1966 film) =

1966 Yugoslav film

- Directed by: Mića Popović
- Written by: Borislav Mihajlović Mihiz; Mića Popović
- Starring: Mira Stupica; Rade Marković; Svetolik Nikačević; Bekim Fehmiu
- Cinematography: Vlastimir Gavrik
- Edited by: Jelena Bjenjaš
- Music by: Zoran Hristić
- Production company: Avala film
- Release date: 1966
- Running time: 90 min
- Country: Yugoslavia
- Language: Serbo-Croatian

The Swarm (Serbo-Croatian: Roj, Serbian Cyrillic: Рој) is a 1966 Yugoslav film directed by Mića Popović and based on a script he wrote together with Borislav Mihajlović Mihiz.

== Plot ==
During the First Serbian Uprising of 1804, in the newly liberated country, a Serbian woman is put on trial for betraying her husband, a hero, to the Ottomans.

== Cast ==
- Mira Stupica as Stojanka
- Rade Marković as Kahriman
- Svetolik Nikačević as Miloje
- Olivera Katarina as Ljubica
- Ljubica Ković
- Dušan Jakšić as priest
- Danilo Bata Stojković as Nikola
- Bekim Fehmiu as Halid Beg
- Stole Aranđelović
- Bora Todorović as young man
- Dušan Golumbovski as Stojan
- Rastislav Jović as pupil
- Snežana Bećarević as Stojanka's daughter
- Dušan Vuisić as Mustafa

== Awards ==
=== Pula Film Festival (1966) ===
- Golden Arena for Best Actress (Mira Stupica)
- Silver Arena for Best Supporting Actor (Bekim Fehmiu)

== Legacy ==
The Yugoslav Film Archive, in accordance with its authorities based on the Law on Cultural Heritage, declared one hundred Serbian feature films (1911–1999) as cultural heritage of great importance on December 28, 2016. The Swarm is also on that list.
