= The Tough Ones (1968 film) =

- Directed by: Mića Popović
- Written by: Mića Popović
- Starring: Ljerka Draženović; Jovan Janićijević Burduš; Danilo Bata Stojković; Mira Stupica; Mihailo Ilić
- Edited by: Mihailo Ilić
- Music by: Dorijan Šetina
- Production companies: Avala film Kino klub Belgrade
- Release date: 1968
- Running time: 82 min
- Country: Yugoslavia
- Language: Serbo-Croatian

The Tough Ones (Serbo-Croatian: Delije, Serbian Cyrillic: Делије) is a 1968 Yugoslav feature film directed by Mića Popović. It belongs to the Yugoslav Black Wave movement, partly because of the modernist style (where black and white is mixed with color photography), but also because of the content that showed the dark side of communist Yugoslavia in its initial years.

== Plot ==
The whirlwind of war has passed and left permanent deformations in the human psyche. After liberation, two brothers return to their village, which was burned and deserted. They show each other their Schmeissers with ammunition that they kept from the war as trophies. And they start a game of aimless shooting, they are joined by a German who was left behind in the rubble after the destruction of the village. In their craze, all three die during the shooting.

== Cast ==
- Jovan Janićijević Burduš as Isidor
- Danilo Bata Stojković as Gvozden
- Mihailo Ilić as German
- Ljerka Draženović as girl
- Mira Stupica as weeping mother
- Mirjana Vacić as singer
- Dušan Janićijević as Vlatko
- Rade Marković
- Ljuba Tadić
- Rastko Tadić
- Miodrag Andrić
- Ljubomir Ćipranić as guard
- Dragomir Felba
- Ljubica Janićijević
- Milan Jelić as young partisan
- Dragana Kalaba
- Damnjan Klašnja
- Petar Lupa as professor
- Zlata Numanagić
- Branko Petković
- Bora Todorović as railway worker
- Nadežda Vukićević

== Legacy ==
The Yugoslav Film Archive, in accordance with its authorities based on the Law on Cultural Heritage, declared one hundred Serbian feature films (1911–1999) as cultural heritage of great importance on December 28, 2016. The Tough Ones is also on that list.
