= Uroš Predić Studio =

- Атеље Уроша Предића; Atelje Uroša Predića
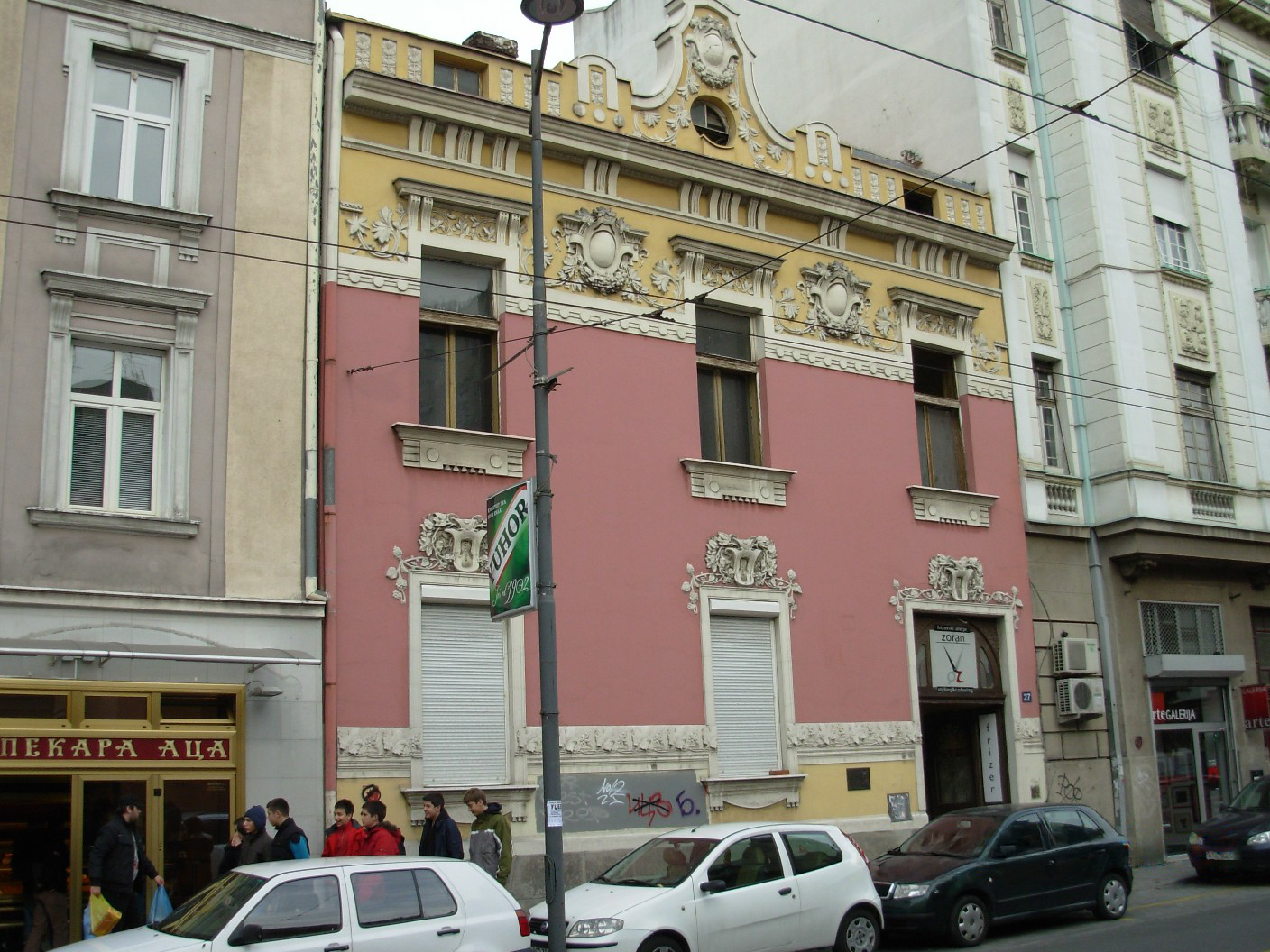
- Uroš Predić Studio, pictured in 2009
- Interactive map of Uroš Predić Studio
- Location: 27 Svetogorska Street, Belgrade, Serbia
- Coordinates: 44.8138°N 20.4685°E
- Designer: Nikola Nestorović
- Type: House with adjoined atelier
- Completion date: 1908
- Opening date: No

Uroš Predić Studio (Serbian Cyrillic: Атеље Уроша Предића, Atelje Uroša Predića) is located at 27 Svetogorska Street in Belgrade, the capital of Serbia. It was built in 1908 for a merchant Josif Predić. His brother Uroš Predić, one of the most important Serbian Realist painters, moved in the house in 1909 and used it as his studio (atelier) until his death in 1953.

Due to its specific small pink façade in the Vienna Secession style, it has been described as a bonbonniere. As of 2018, it is the oldest preserved atelier in Belgrade. It has been declared a cultural monument and protected by law in 1987.

== Location ==
The house is located at 27 Svetogorska Street, at the mid-section of the street. It is situated in the south-east part of the municipality of Stari Grad. The neighbourhood was known as the Dva Bela Goluba ("Two White Doves"), after the famous kafana in the neighborhood. The house is located among several other cultural monuments in the neighbourhood: Jevrem Grujić's House (17 Svetogorska St, built 1896, protected 1961), House of Dr. Stanoje Stanojević (32 Svetogorska St, built 1899, protected 1984), Commercial Academy Building (48 Svetogorska St, built 1926, protected 1992), Artisans Club Building in Belgrade (2 Hilandarska St, built 1933, protected 1984) and Building of Ljubomir Miladinović (6 Hilandarska St, built 1938, protected 2001). Also in the vicinity is the theatre house Atelje 212.

== Building ==
The house was built in 1908 as a family, one-storey house for Josif Predić, according to the design of a prominent architect Nikola Nestorović. The house is shaped after an elongated floor plan, with free side façades. The elongation of the house to the inside was a forced solution, due to the shape of the parcel on which it was projected. Hence, all the house rooms (living rooms, bedrooms, kitchen, dining room, pantries) are located in the direction of the objects depth. The main salon was located along the street.

The design of the front façade is ornamented in the Art Nouveau style, as a uniform surface with dynamic plastic decoration. The still distinct traditional impact of the Academism is noticeable in the treatment of the apertures and cornice.

Richly decorated front façade of the house, with the friezes of the grape vine, floral wreaths twisted around the medallions, is one of the most interesting examples of implementation of the Vienna secession in Belgrade architecture from the beginning of the 20th century. The smallish canvas of the façade is conceptualized without standard Academic divisions of the space and presented an array of new stylish elements. Gradation of the relief plastic in the vertical direction, which is so typical for the secession, was applied in this case to the letter. The yard cart gate is placed laterally to the façade and has stylized wooden door and stained glass above it. Until the late 1950s it was possible to see all the way to the Danube and the Banat plain across the river, but since then the neighbouring highrise encircled the old house and closed the view.

The studio itself was additionally built next to the already existing building on the inner, yard side. It is of a modest size with huge glass windows and a small balcony. It was specifically built as an atelier, which makes it one of the first in Belgrade, and intended as a gift from Josif to his brother Uroš. It covers an area of 40 m (130 ft) and hasn't been expanded since it was built.

The studio is approached via a yard's cart door and has its own, separate entrance. As much as the outer façade is ornamented with the Secession decorations, that much is the "painter's entry" plain and simple. The studio was built above the Uroš Predić's apartment in the house, and the two are connected by a spiral staircase. As it was originally planned to be an artist's atelier, the room is still fully functional for its purpose, though it was neglected in time. The atelier is 4 m (13 ft) tall and the entire front wall is actually a glass panel, so that there is enough light.

== History ==
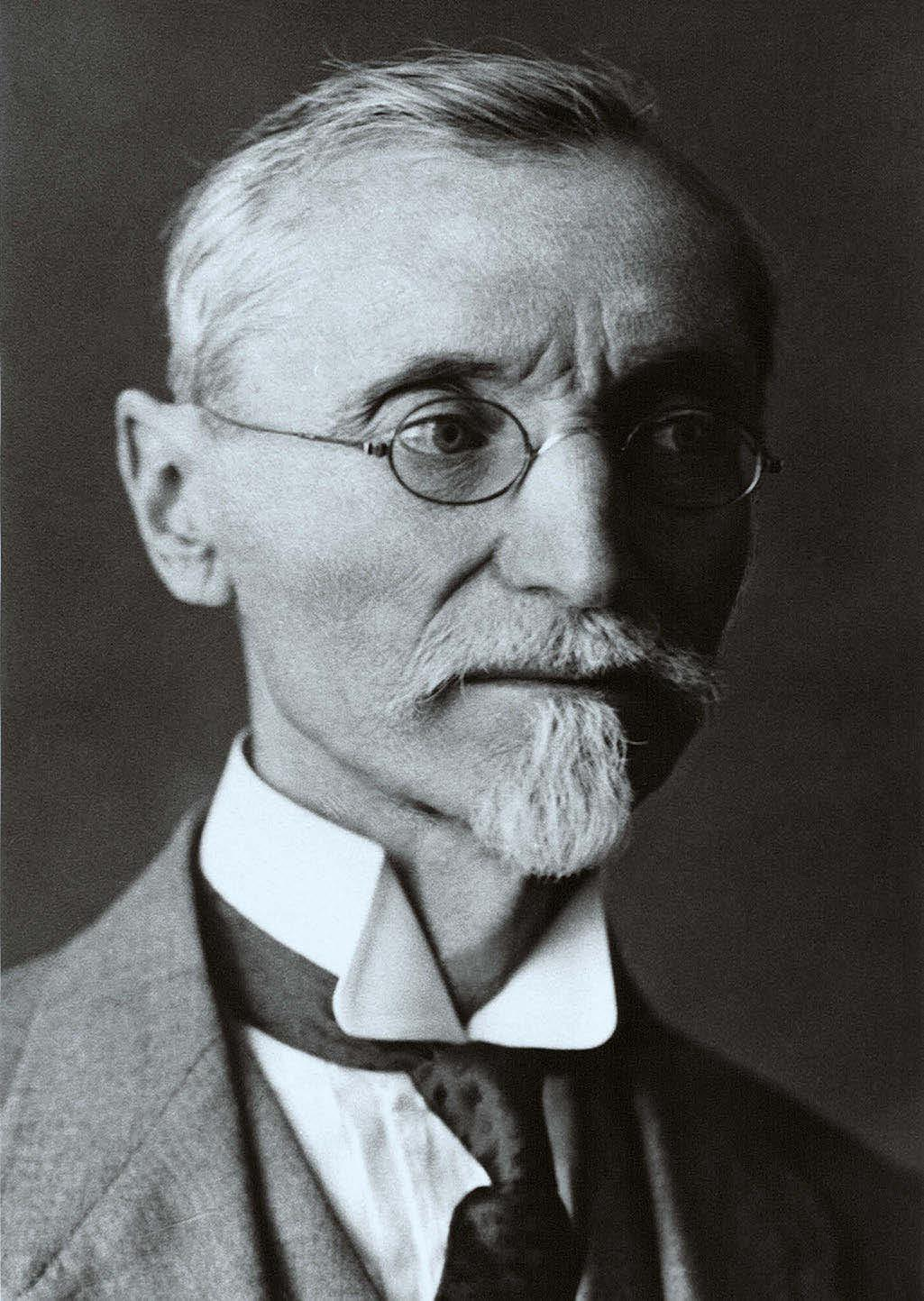
Painter Uroš Predić (1857-1953), one of the founders of Serbian Academic Realism. He lived in the house from 1909 to his death in 1953

The house was finished in 1908. A year later, Uroš Predić moved in, upon his arrival from his birthplace Orlovat, near Zrenjanin, at the time part of Austria-Hungary. He remained in the house for the next 44 years and died in the house on 11 February 1953. Some of his most important works were created in the atelier. As Predić never married and had no children, according to his will, the majority of his belongings were transferred from his studio to the National Museum in Zrenjanin. They included his personal objects, paintings, easel, correspondence, etc. Some of his personal possessions are kept by the members of his wider family.

After Predić's death, another well known artist, Miodrag B. Protić, a painter and a manager of the Belgrade's Museum of Contemporary Art, moved in the house. He was a tenant from the autumn of 1954 to 1957. While Predić was known for his historically and religiously realistic paintings, Protić, on the other hand, was a representative of an abstract art. As some art historians noted, "different kind of paintings were now created in Predić's atelier. Abstraction inherited realism". Protić, however, didn't stay long in the atelier, so the studio was vacant for a while.

Painter Stojan Ćelić was the next tenant. After being awarded with the 1958 October Award for graphics, he used the prize money to buy the house. Ćelić later became dean of the Artistic Academy and member of the Serbian Academy of Sciences and Arts. He introduced some minor changes, adding a toilet and the kitchenette. By the time Ćelić purchased the house, spiral staircase which connected the atelier and the apartment below were already closed. Being in downtown but secluded in the inner yard, the atelier was especially popular meeting place while Ćelić lived in it. So much, that he had to set two days in a week when he was receiving guests. Frequent visitors who participated in lively debates included painters (Mladen Srbinović), authors (Slobodan Selenić, Boris Heljd, Vuk Krnjević, Žarko Komanin), sculptors (Aleksandar Zarin), journalists (Zoran Žujović), art historians (Irina Subotić). The only person who was allowed to visit unannounced was Ćelić's longtime friend, theatrical director Ljubomir Draškić. When he would get fed up by the guests in the house, Ćelić was known to say "I wouldn't bother you any more", even though he was the host. He died on 30 April 1992.

After being vacant for eight years after Ćelić's death, painter Đorđe Ivačković purchased the house in 2000. He acquired the house to preserve the memory on Uroš Predić, as he mostly lived in Paris where he had a prosperous international career. Ivačković died in 2012 and his family inherited the house. Some of his paintings are still in the atelier which has been maintained to a certain level, but it is not used as a painting atelier anymore.

== Importance ==
In general, the house is one of major representatives of the Vienna Secession style in Belgrade architecture of the early 20th century, with discrete, but visible, touches of Academism.

Uroš Predić studio, as the space the great artist used to live and create in, along with the artistic legacy, is part of the special monumental values of the memorial character in Belgrade. Hence, the house was declared a cultural monument in 1987. The explanation of the Institute for the protection of the monuments said: "Uroš Predić's Atelier is located in the building which was built in 1908, on a design by architect Nikola Nestorović, as a family house of Uroš's brother Josif Predić. In this atelier he (Uroš) spent 44 years, since 1909 when he moved in, to his death in 1953. In it, he created his most important paintings, which in great measure set the direction of the development of the Serbian painting in the first decade of the 20th century".
