= Milet Andrejevic =

Yugoslav painter

Milet Andrejević (28 September 1925 – 21 October 1989) was a Yugoslav-born American painter in the realist tradition. A classically trained artist who went through a series of different artistic periods, including post-Impressionism, Expressionism, and Pop Art, Andrejević was best known for his allegorical landscapes set in New York City's Central Park.

== Early life ==
Born Mileta Andrejević in Zrenjanin, Yugoslavia, Andrejević studied painting at the Belgrade Academy of Fine Arts. His brother, Krsta Andrejević, also become a well-known painter in the former Yugoslavia. As a teen, he lived through the Nazi occupation of Yugoslavia and was eventually conscripted into Tito's army at the end of World War II. Andrejević studied under Ivan Tabaković at the Academy of Fine Arts in Belgrade, where he joined several of the artists who would form the Zadar Group, including Mića Popović, Bata Mihajlović, Petar Omčikus, Ljubinka Jovanović, Kosara Bokšan, and Vera Božičković.

In 1952, Andrejević relocated to Paris to study art and did not return to Yugoslavia for twenty years. He married the former Helen Bardeen in Paris in 1956 and came to live with her in New York City in 1958.

== Critical success ==
Andrejević's work turned toward Pop Art during the late 1950s and his work was exhibited in the Green Gallery then run by Richard Bellamy. In the 1960s, he adopted a more realist style that featured allegories of Greek myths set in Central Park. He received positive reviews from then New York Times art critic Hilton Kramer who called Andrejević, "clearly one of the most gifted painters of the contemporary Realist school." Kramer went on to write that, "He brings to his art an unusual sense of refinement - an eye calmly and exquisitely attuned to pictorial nuance. His best pictures achieve a purity of tone and a gravity of feeling unusual in the Realist painting of any period and very different, certainly, from some of the more clamorous Realist styles of our own day."

Andrejević showed his work at the Robert Schoelkopf gallery and in the collections of the Hirshhorn Museum and Sculpture Garden in Washington D.C. and the Whitney Museum of American Art in New York City.

In 1988, he was elected member of the Serbian Academy of Sciences and Arts.

Andrejević died of lung cancer in 1989.
