= The December Group =

The December Group (Serbian: Децембарска група, Decembarska grupa) was a Serbian artistic group founded in Belgrade in 1955. It ceased to exist in 1960.

The December Group was opposed to social realism in art, instead preferring abstraction. The group's members were Zoran Petrović, Miloš Bajić, Aleksandar Luković, Lazar Vujaklija, Mladen Srbinović, Aleksandar Tomašević, Lazar Vozarević, Miodrag B. Protić, Stojan Ćelić and Dragutin Cigarčić.

The group held nine exhibitions. Retrospectives of their work were shown in Belgrade in 1969 at the Gallery of the Cultural Center and in 1995 at the Zepter Gallery.

== Exhibitions ==
- 1955. 4–15 December, Umetnički paviljon, Beograd
- 1956. 20–30 September, Umetnički paviljon, Sarajevo
- 1956. 17–27 November, Umetnički paviljon, Beograd
- 1957. 11–20 December, Umetnički paviljon, Beograd
- 1958. 15 April – 4 May, Galeria Sztuki, Varšava
- 1958. 4–15 October, Umjetnički paviljon, Zagreb
- 1958. 21–31 December, Umetnički paviljon, Beograd
- 1960. April–May, Narodni muzej, Pančevo
- 1960. 21–30 December, Umetnički paviljon, Beograd
