= The Man from the Oak Forest =

- Čovek iz hrastove šume
- Directed by: Mića Popović
- Written by: Mića Popović
- Starring: Mija Aleksić; Tamara Miletić; Božidar Pavićević; Aleksandar Stojković
- Music by: Zoran Hristić
- Production company: Avala film
- Release date: 1964
- Running time: 87 min
- Country: Yugoslavia
- Language: Serbo-Croatian

The Man from the Oak Forest (Serbo-Croatian: Čovek iz hrastove šume, Serbian Cyrillic: Човек из храстове шуме) is a 1964 Yugoslav film directed by Mića Popović. It belongs to the Yugoslav Black Wave movement.

== Plot ==
The film takes place during the Second World War in Yugoslavia. Once a shepherd, thug and murderer Maksim terrorizes and commits crimes in remote mountain villages in the name of Chetnik ideology, although he refuses to associate with the local Chetnik movement and considers himself a free spirit. His reputation earns him the nickname "the poet of death" (pesnik smrti).

Under the guise of a black market smuggler, a woman from a local town continually connects the town and the village in the mountains and helps organize the town's Partisan unit. Maksim falls in love with her, but becomes convinced that she is looking for gold, which is why he starts killing even more in order to get the money. Soon, he becomes a target of both Partisans and Chetniks. The film culminates in a crossfire where Maksim dies.

== Cast ==
- Mija Aleksić as Maksim
- Predrag Ćeramilac as Nine
- Tamara Miletić as black market smuggler
- Božidar Pavićević as teacher
- Aleksandar Stojković as Duke
- Danilo Bata Stojković as Stevan
- Milivoje Tomić as Petar Pačić
- Velimir Bata Živojinović as professor
- Dimitrije Bugarčić
- Ksenija Conić
- Nikola Gašić
- Zoran Jerković
- Stevan Petrović
- Miloranka Stojković
- Milorad Uzelac

== Legacy ==
The Yugoslav Film Archive, in accordance with its authorities based on the Law on Cultural Heritage, declared one hundred Serbian feature films (1911–1999) as cultural heritage of great importance on December 28, 2016. The Man from the Oak Forest is also on that list.
