= Vera Božičković-Popović =

Yugoslavian abstract painter

- Вера Божичковић Поповић
- Born: 8 May 1920; Brčko
- Died: 6 March 2002 (aged 81); Belgrade
- Occupation: Painter
- Spouse(s): Mića Popović

Vera Božičković-Popović (8 May 1920 – 6 March 2002) was a Yugoslavian abstract painter.

== Biography ==
Vera Božičković was born on 8 May 1920 in Brčko, Yugoslavia, now part of Bosnia and Herzegovina.

She studied under Marko Čelebonović at the Academy of Fine Arts in Belgrade, graduating in 1949. The same year she married painter Mića Popović. The Popovićs and others, including Petar Omčikus, Kosara Bokšan, Bata Mihailović, Ljubinka Jovanović, and Mileta Andrejević, had relocated to Zadar briefly in 1947 and formed the Zadar Group of painters. Božičković-Popović was also a member of the Association of Serbian Artists LADA.

The Popovićs apartment and studio in Belgrade was the site of the first Yugoslavian performance of Samuel Beckett's Waiting for Godot in the summer of 1954.

Vera Božičković-Popović died on 6 March 2002 in Belgrade.

== Work ==
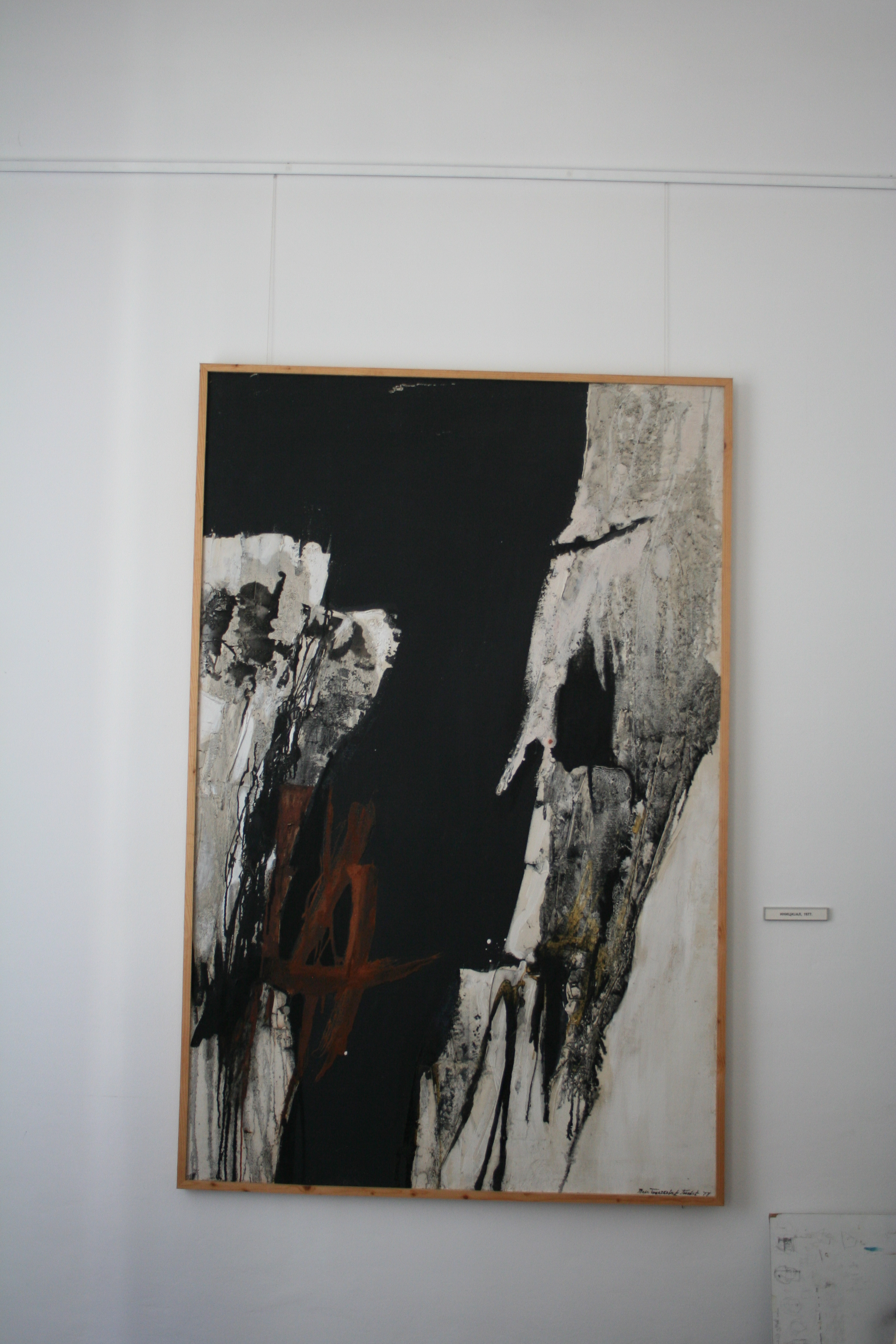
Initial (1977) by Vera Božičković-Popović

In the 1950s, Vera Božičković-Popović worked in a style called informalism, creating roughly textured and heavily abstract paintings. Her key works include Untitled (1958-1959), Torched Landscape (1959), Penetration of Light (1960), Landscape (1961), Horizontal Composition (1961), Dissipation (1961), and Vertical Layering (1962), representing some of the most radical and most valuable examples of Art Informel in Belgrade-based painting of this artistic orientation.
