= U raskoraku =

1968 film

- Directed by: Milenko Štrbac
- Written by: Milenko Štrbac
- Starring: Ivan Bekjarev
- Cinematography: Milivoje Milivojevic
- Edited by: Mirjana Mitic
- Release date: 1968
- Running time: 88 minutes
- Country: Yugoslavia
- Language: Serbo-Croatian

U raskoraku is a 1968 Yugoslavian drama film directed and written by Milenko Štrbac. It was entered in the 18th Berlin International Film Festival.

== Cast ==
- Dragomir Bojanić as Jablan Jezdić
- Gizela Vuković as Dana Jezdić
- Dušan Janićijević
- Dragomir Felba as Marko
- Danilo Stojković as Postar
- Petar Božović as Veliša Jezdić
- Jovan Janićijević Burduš
- Gojko Šantić as Bane
- Ljuba Tadić as Dica
- Dragan Zarić as Mile
- Ivan Bekjarev
- Dragomir Čumić
- Tomanija Đuričko
- Ljiljana Jovanović
- Ljiljana Lašić
- Stanislava Pešić
- Ljubiša Samardžić
- Ivan Đurđević
- Jovan Rančić
