= Mira Stupica =

Serbian and Yugoslav actress and theatre director

- Мира Ступица
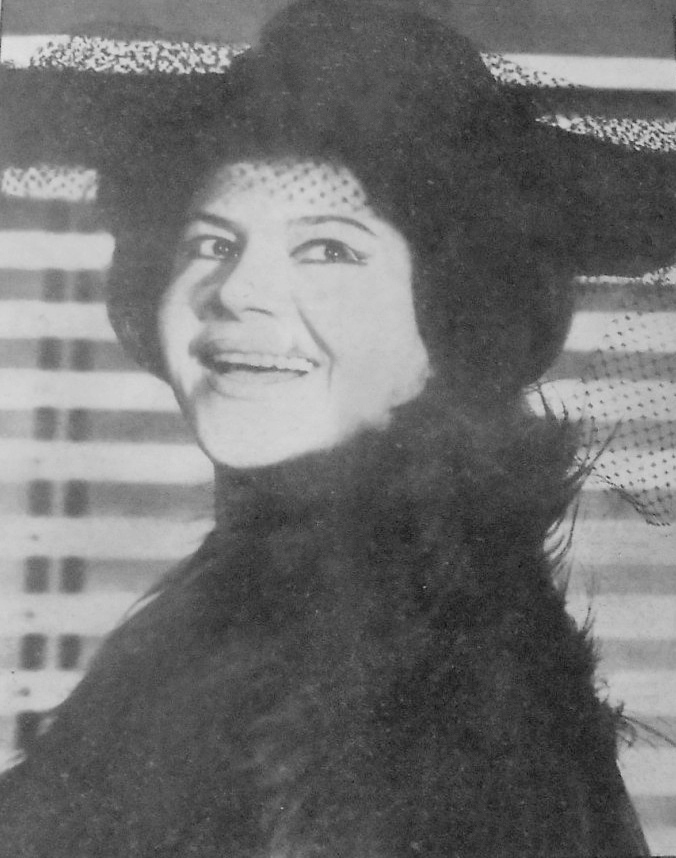
- Stupica in 1964

First Lady of Yugoslavia
- In role 15 May 1980 – 15 May 1981
- President: Cvijetin Mijatović
- Preceded by: Jovanka Broz
- Succeeded by: Judita Alargić

Personal details
- Born: Miroslava Todorović; 17 August 1923 Gnjilane, Kingdom of Serbs, Croats and Slovenes
- Died: 19 August 2016 (aged 93) Belgrade, Serbia
- Spouses: Milivoj "Mavid" Popović (m. 1943; div. 1947) Bojan Stupica (m. 1948; died 1970) Cvijetin Mijatović (m. 1973; died 1993)
- Children: 1
- Occupation: Actress (1940-2016)

Miroslava "Mira" Stupica (Serbian Cyrillic: Мирослава “Мира” Ступица; née Todorović; 17 August 1923 – 19 August 2016) was a Serbian actress and First Lady of Yugoslavia from 1980 to 1981 as the second wife of President Cvijetin Mijatović.

Stupica was best known for her work in the theatre, but also had an extensive career in television and films. Stupica was popular for over 60 years and was celebrated as the ‘actress of the century’ by her peers, she is considered one of the best Serbian actresses of all time.

== Early life ==
Miroslava Todorović was born in Gnjilane, Kingdom of Serbs, Croats and Slovenes as the first child of Serb parents—Danica Stanišić from Livno and Radomir Todorović from Orašac, both gymnasium teachers. After Miroslava, the couple had three more children, all boys: Predrag (died at the age of two), Zoran (died at the age of three), and Borivoje, who would go on to become a famous and accomplished actor himself.

Following the couple's teaching postings, the family later moved to Gornji Milanovac, in central Serbia, where Miroslava's father, a talented violinist, died young in 1932, and then to Aranđelovac, before eventually settling in Belgrade where Mira graduated secondary school at the city's Trade Academy (Trgovačka akademija).

== Career ==
=== Theatre ===
Todorović began acting during high school by enrolling in and completing the Artistic Theatre's acting studio in Belgrade, where she soon began acting professionally in 1940 after being noticed by Viktor Starčić. In 1941, she moved to Belgrade's National Theatre. Her early career, just like her personal life at the time, centred around the then popular and established actor Milivoj "Mavid" Popović, who became her husband in 1943. The couple had a daughter, Mina, before their four-year marriage ended. During and after World War II, she acted in theatres in Šabac (1943–45) and Niš (1945–47), after which she returned to the National Theatre in Belgrade.

In 1948, she was invited to the newly established Yugoslav Drama Theatre (JDP) by Bojan Stupica, tour de force of Serbian theatre, who was in charge of creating JDP and making it the forerunner of the modern theatre in the state. Remaining at JDP on and off till 1970, she often changed theatre houses: 1955–57 Croatian National Theatre in Zagreb, JDP again 1957–59, then National Theatre in Belgrade 1959–63, JDP again 1963–70, and finally National Theatre in Belgrade 1970–79. She guested in Atelje 212, Belgrade Drama Theatre, Zvezdara Theatre, and Titograd's National Theatre. On European tour she won international acclaim as Petrunjela in Dundo Maroje by Marin Držić in Vienna, Paris and Moscow.

Her work at JDP with Bojan Stupica and their subsequent marriage had a seminal influence on Mira’s maturity as an actress. She was known for her rich expression, emotivity, and inspiring temperament as well as for possessing universal aptitude toward acting, which allowed her to equally master both dramatic and comedic roles, and to successfully break barriers between genres. Many of her performances are considered to be anthology roles in Serbian theatre.

Apart from Petrunjela, others include: Živka (The Cabinet minister’s wife by Branislav Nušić), Joan of Arc (Saint Joan by George Bernard Shaw), Colombe (by Jean Anouilh), Grusha Vashnadze (The Caucasian Chalk Circle by Bertold Brecht), Lucietta (Le baruffe chiozzotte by Carlo Goldoni, Commissar (An Optimistic Tragedy by Vsevolod Vishnevsky), Glorija (by Ranko Marinković), Mirandolina (The Mistress of the Inn by Carlo Goldoni), Melita (Leda by Miroslav Krleža), Signora Ignazia (Tonight We Improvise by Luigi Pirandello), Mary (Mary fights with the angels by Pavel Kohout), Chérubin (The Marriage of Figaro by Beaumarchais), Ljubica (Đido by Janko Veselinović), Grushenka (The Brothers Karamazov by Fyodor Dostoyevsky), Alexandra Negina (Talents and Admirers by Aleksandr Ostrovsky), Danica (Ljubav by Milan Đoković), Madame Sans-Gêne (by Victorien Sardou), Actress (L'Otage by Paul Claudel), Baroness Castelli-Glembay (Messrs. Glembay by Miroslav Krleža), Nastasya Filipovna (The Idiot by Fyodor Dostoyevsky, Jenny Diver (The Threepenny Opera by Bertrold Brecht), Anna Karenina by Leo Tolstoy, and Lady Milford (Intrigue and Love by Friedrich Schiller). Her final role was Princess Ksenija of Montenegro in the drama of the same name by Radmila Vojvodić in 1994.

=== Film ===
Although predominantly a theatrical actress, she landed several prominent film roles, especially in the 1950s and 1960s. She made her feature film debut in 1951 film Bakonja fra Brne by Fedor Hanžeković, followed by the roles in The Parvenus (1953; directed by Bojan Stupica), I Was Stronger (1953; Gustav Gavrin), Stojan Mutikaša (1954; Fedor Hanžeković), Hanka (1955; Slavko Vorkapić), U mreži (1956; Bojan Stupica), Mali čovek (1957; Žika Čukulić), The Fourteenth Day (1960; Zdravko Velimirović), Destination Death (1964; Wolfgang Staudte), Narodni poslanik (1964; Stole Janković), Roj (1966; Mića Popović), Pre rata (1966; Vuk Babić), Palma među palmama (1967; Milo Đukanović), Delije (1968; Mića Popović), Sunce tuđeg neba (1968; Milutin Kosovac), Krvava bajka (1969; Branimir Tori Janković), Doručak sa đavolom (1971; Mika Antić), Kako umreti (1972; Miomir Miki Stamenković), Zvezde su oči ratnika (1972; Branimir Tori Janković) and Sablazan (1982; Dragovan Jovanović). After a long absence from the silver screen, younger generation of Serbian movie directors again showed interest in her, so she appeared in well received supporting roles in 2006 in Miroslav Momčilović’s Seven and a half, and, in 2011 in Srđan Dragojević’s The Parade.

=== Television ===
After appearing in several TV movies, filmed plays and episodes of TV series, she landed the role of Kika Bibić, an illiterate woman who learns to read in the educational series TV Bukvar (TV Spelling-book), written by Aleksandar Popović for Radio Television Belgrade. Aired from 1968 to 1969, it brought Stupica an exceptional broad popularity and critical praise for her remarkable creation of folksy Kika. Many people believed that she is a real person, so much that she had a whole page in daily Politika on Saturday to answer to the letters sent to Kika. Her other noteworthy TV roles include those in mini-series Sedam sekretara SKOJ-a (1981), Španac (1982) and especially Priče iz fabrike (1985) and Otvorena vrata (1995).

== Personal life ==
In 1943, at the age of 19, she married popular Serbian actor and famous playboy Milivoj "Mavid" Popović (1909–94), who was 14 years her senior. Their wedding was a popular media event in German-occupied Serbia. They had a daughter Jasmina-Mina, but soon divorced. In 1948, she married Bojan Stupica, a Slovene theatrical director, who was a major force in Serbian theatre until his death on 22 May 1970.

Widowed, in 1973, she married communist politician Cvijetin Mijatović, remaining with him until his death on 15 November 1993. From 15 May 1980 to 15 May 1981, Mijatović presided over the Yugoslav Presidency, the country's collective presidency, making Stupica Yugoslavia's first lady in that period.

Apart from her popular actor brother Bora Todorović, her nephew, Bora’s son Srđan, is a musician, a former member of Ekaterina Velika and Disciplin A Kitschme, as well as a popular actor in Serbian cinema since the mid-1980s.

In 2015, she settled at a retirement home in the Belgrade borough of Zemun.

On 10 March 2016 Stupica suffered a stroke, and after months without leaving the hospital, died on 19 August 2016.

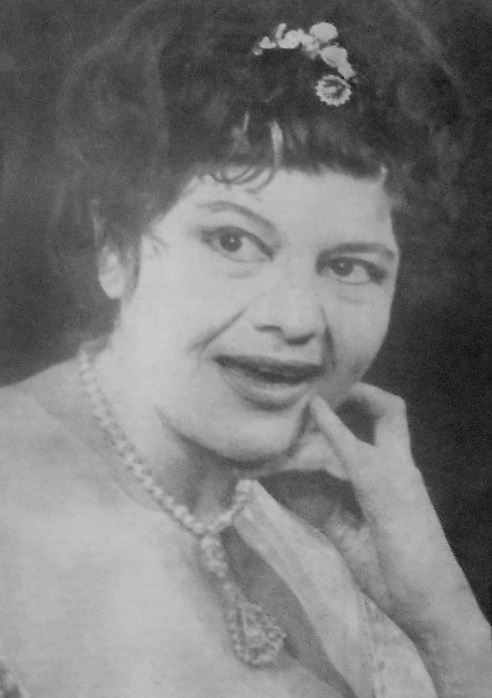
Stupica in 1966

== Honours/Accolades ==
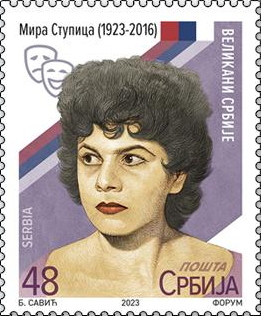
Stupica on a 2023 stamp of Serbia

Stupica was awarded the Award of the Federal Government of FNRJ in 1949 and Sedmojulska nagrada (at the time the highest government award in Serbia) in 1960.

She also won two awards at Sterijino pozorje in Novi Sad, the most important theatrical festival in Serbia, three Golden Lauren Wreath awards at MES in Sarajevo, and the Ljubiša Jovanović award in Šabac in 1986. Stupica was awarded the highest theatrical awards for lifetime achievement in Serbian theatre, including Dobričin prsten in 1981, Statuette of Joakim Vujić in 1985 and lifetime achievement awards at Sterijino pozorje in 1984 and at the Dani Zorana Radmilovića festival in Zaječar in 2013. At Pula Film Festival, the top film festival in former Yugoslavia, she won two best actress awards, in 1954 (Stojan Mutikaša) and the Golden Arena in 1966 (Roj).

At the Filmski susreti, actor’s festival in Niš, she was awarded at the inaugural festival in 1966 as the best actress (Roj). In 1969 she and Miodrag Petrović Čkalja won an award as the best acting couple of the year (Stupica for TV Bukvar). In 2006 she won an award for the best supporting female role in Seven and a half and in 2007, the Pavle Vuisić award, the highest film acting award in Serbia, for her lifetime achievement in the movies.

In 2001, on the celebration of her 60-years of acting. Stupica on the stage publicly called for establishing the Velika Žanka award (Great Žanka), in honor of Žanka Stokić (1887–1947), today generally considered the best theatrical Serbian actress ever, pointing out that there are no appropriate awards for actresses in their prime, when they are too old for the debutant awards and still too young for the life-time awards. In 2002, it was announced that a new award would be established the next year, under the name of Žanka Stokić award. Mira Stupica was the president for life of the jury and the award has been awarded yearly ever since.

On 23 September 2013, an exhibition titled Mira Stupica – actress of the century was held in the Museum of the National Theatre in Belgrade.

In 2000, she published her autobiography Šaka soli (A handful of salt). The book, which was written in a specific, almost scenic style, became a bestseller in Serbia.

== Roles ==
=== Theatre (selected) ===
Year	Title	Role	Author
1941	The Marriage of Figaro	Chérubin	Beaumarchais
1941	Đido	Ljubica	Janko Veselinović
1942	A Midsummer Night's Dream	Puck	William Shakespeare
1942	Zona Zamfirova	Ruška	Stevan Sremac
1943	Kir Janja	Katica	Jovan Sterija Popović
1943	Tartuffe	Dorine	Molière
1948	Le baruffe chiozzotte	Lucietta	Carlo Goldoni
1949	Dundo Maroje	Petrunjela	Marin Držić
1949	Talents and Admirers	Alexandra Negina	Aleksandr Ostrovsky
195?	The Mistress of the Inn	Mirandolina	Carlo Goldoni
195?	Anna Karenina	Anna Karenina	Leo Tolstoy
1953	Blood Wedding	The Bride	Federico García Lorca
1955	Glorija	Glorija	Ranko Marinković
1955	Saint Joan	Joan of Arc	George Bernard Shaw
1956	Colombe	Colombe	Jean Anouilh
1957	The Caucasian Chalk Circle	Grusha Vashnadze	Bertold Brecht
1957	An Optimistic Tragedy	Commissar	Vsevolod Vishnevsky
1958	The Brothers Karamazov	Grushenka	Fyodor Dostoyevsky
1958	The Cabinet minister’s wife	Živka	Branislav Nušić
1959	The Threepenny Opera	Jenny Diver	Bertold Brecht
1959	Ljubav	Danica	Milan Đoković
1959	The Idiot	Nastasya Filipovna	Fyodor Dostoyevsky
1962	Leda	Melita	Miroslav Krleža
1973	Messrs. Glembay	Baroness Castelli-Glembay	Miroslav Krleža
1979	Stanoje Glavaš	Stana	Đura Jakšić
1983	Tonight We Improvise	Signora Ignazia	Luigi Pirandello
1984	Mary fights with the angels	Mary	Pavel Kohout
1986	Tattooed souls	Altana	Goran Stefanovski
1992	General Nedić	Živka Nedić	Siniša Kovačević
1994	Princess Ksenija of Montenegro	Princess Ksenija	Radmila Vojvodić
	"Madame Sans-Gêne"	Catherine Hübscher	Victorien Sardou
	L'Otage	Actress	Paul Claudel
	Intrigue and Love	Lady Milford	Friedrich Schiller
	Fuenteovejuna	Laurencia	Lope de Vega
	Twelfth Night	Viola	William Shakespeare
	The Lower Depths	Vassilisa	Maxim Gorky

=== Filmography ===
Year	English title	Original title	Role	Director
1951	Bakonja fra Brne	Bakonja fra Brne	Maša	Fedor Hanžeković
1953	The Parvenus	Jara gospoda	Ančka	Bojan Stupica
1953	I Was Stronger	Bila sam jača	Zora	Gustav Gavrin
1954	Stojan Mutikaša	Stojan Mutikaša	Anđa	Fedor Hanžeković
1955	Hanka	Hanka	Ajkuna	Slavko Vorkapić
1956	In the Net	U mreži	Višnja	Bojan Stupica
1957	Little Man	Mali čovek	Nada	Žika Čukulić
1960	The Fourteenth Day	Dan četrnaesti	Kristina	Zdravko Velimirović
1964	Destination Death	Muški izlet	Miroslava	Wolfgang Staudte
1964	People’s Deputy	Narodni poslanik	Pavka	Stole Janković
1966	The Swarm	Roj	Stojanka	Mića Popović
1966	Before the War	Pre rata	Sarka	Vuk Babić
1967	Palm among the Palms	Palma među palmama	Palma	Milo Đukanović
1968	The Sun of Another Sky	Sunce tuđeg neba	Rosa	Milutin Kosovac
1968	The Tough Ones	Delije	Lepša	Mića Popović
1969	A Bloody Fairytale	Krvava bajka	Piljak’s mother	Tori Janković
1969	A Certain Distant Light	Neka daleka svjetlost	Uroš’s wife	Josip Lešić
1971	Breakfast with the Devil	Doručak sa đavolom	Olga	Miroslav Antić
1972	The Stars are the Eyes of warriors	Zvezde su oči ratnika	Nana	Tori Janković
1972	How to Die	Kako umreti		Miki Stamenković
1973	Mortal Spring	Samrtno proleće	Aunt Ema	Miguel Iglesias Bonns & Stevan Petrović
1982	Blasphemy	Sablazan	Miloš’s nana	Dragovan Jovanović
2006	Seven and a Half	Sedam i po	Milica	Miroslav Momčilović
2011	The Parade	Parada	Granny Olga	Srđan Dragojević

=== Television ===
Year	Original title	Role	Notes
1959	Dundo Maroje	Petrunjela	TV movie
1961	Siromašni mali ljudi		TV movie
1967	Volite se ljudi		TV series; 1 episode
1967	Zabavlja vas Mija Aleksić		TV show; 1 episode
1967	Noćna kafana		Short
1968	Parničari	Peasant woman	TV series; 1 episode
1968	Maksim našeg doba		TV series; 1 episode
1968	Kalendar Jovana Orlovića	Caca	TV movie
1968–1969	TV Bukvar	Kika Bibić	TV series
1969	Preko mrtvih	Hristina Petrović	TV movies
1970	Mirina TV stupica		TV series
1971	Sve od sebe		Mini-series
1971	Operacija 30 slova		TV series
1971	Jedan čovek – jedna pesma		TV series short
1972	Ženski razgovori		TV series
1972	Selo bez seljaka		TV series; 1 episode
1972	Slava i san	Mother	TV movie
1972	Nesporazum	Marta	TV movie
1973	Težak put		TV movie
1976	Odluka	Dušanka	TV movie
1976	Poseta stare dame	Klara Zahanasijan	TV movie
1977	Zovem se Eli	Mother	TV movie
1978	Gospodarev zet		TV movie
1981	Sedam sekretara SKOJ-a	Zlatko Šnajder’s mother	TV series
1982	Priče preko pune linije	Rajna Prokić	TV series; 1 episode
1982	Španac	Žikica Jovanović Španac’s mother	Mini series
1983	Imenjaci	Mira	TV series; 1 episode
1985	Priče iz fabrike	Emilija Bošnjaković Babac	TV series
1987	Ženska priča	Majka	TV movie
1989	Ranjenik	Old woman	TV series
1990	Gala korisnica: Atelje 212 kroz vekove	Herself	TV special
1995	Otvorena vrata	Kristina Trobožić	TV series; 6 episodes
