= The Tough Ones =

The Tough Ones may refer to:

- The Tough Ones (1999 film), a.k.a. Häjyt, a Finnish film
- The Tough Ones (1976 film), an Italian poliziottesco film directed by Umberto Lenzi
- The Tough Ones (1968 film), a Yugoslav film

== See also ==
- The Tough One, a 1966 Spanish/Italian spaghetti Western
