= Special Treatment (film) =

1980 film

- Directed by: Goran Paskaljević
- Written by: Filip David; Dušan Kovačević (play and screenplay); Goran Paskaljević
- Produced by: Dan Tana; Milan Zmukic
- Starring: Ljuba Tadic
- Cinematography: Aleksandar Petkovic
- Edited by: Olga Skrigin
- Release date: 1980
- Running time: 94 minutes
- Country: Yugoslavia
- Language: Serbo-Croatian

Special Treatment (Serbian: Посебан третман, translit. Poseban tretman) is a 1980 Yugoslavian drama film directed by Goran Paskaljević. It was entered into the 1980 Cannes Film Festival where Milena Dravić won the award for Best Supporting Actress. The film was also selected as the Yugoslav entry for the Best Foreign Language Film at the 53rd Academy Awards, but was not accepted as a nominee.

== Cast ==
- Ljuba Tadić - Dr. Ilic
- Danilo Stojković - Steva
- Dušica Žegarac - Jelena
- Milena Dravić - Kaca
- Milan Srdoč - Ceda
- Petar Kralj - Marko
- Radmila Živković - Mila
- Bora Todorović - Rade
- Predrag Bijelić - Dejan
- Bata Živojinović - Direktor
- Pavle Vuisić - Direktorov otac
- Dušan Janićijević - Kum
- Danilo Lazović - Cira

== See also ==
- List of submissions to the 53rd Academy Awards for Best Foreign Language Film
- List of Yugoslav submissions for the Academy Award for Best Foreign Language Film
