= Protić =

Protić (Serbian Cyrillic: Протић) is a Serbian surname. Notable people with the surname include:

- Kosta Protić (1831–1892), Serbian military officer
- Milan St. Protić (born 1957), Serbian historian, politician and diplomat
- Milorad B. Protić (1911–2001), Serbian astronomer
- Miodrag B. Protić (1922–2014), Serbian painter
- Nemanja Protić (born 1986), Serbian basketball player
- Radoš Protić (born 1987), Serbian footballer
- Stojan Protić (1857–1923), Serbian politician and writer
