= Backbone (1975 film) =

1975 film

- Directed by: Vlatko Gilić
- Written by: Vlatko Gilić
- Produced by: Svetlana Jovanović; Dan Tana
- Starring: Dragan Nikolić
- Cinematography: Branko Ivatović; Živorad Milić
- Edited by: Leposava Aleksić; Olga Skrigin
- Music by: Walter Scharf
- Release date: 1975
- Running time: 91 minutes
- Country: Yugoslavia
- Language: Serbo-Croatian

Backbone (Serbian: Kičma), is a 1975 Yugoslavian drama film directed by Vlatko Gilić. It was entered into the 1977 Cannes Film Festival.

== Cast ==
- Dragan Nikolić as Pavle Gvozdenović
- Predrag Laković as Pepi
- Mira Banjac
- Milutin Butković
- Stanislava Janjic as Ana
- Seka Sablić (as Jelisaveta Sabljic)
- Nada Skrinjar as Bolesnica
- Miroljub Lešo
- Neda Spasojević
- Đorđe Jelisić
- Renata Ulmanski as Woman from kafana
- Slađana Matović as Jelena
- Dragomir Felba
- Danilo "Bata" Stojković as Man from kafane
- Jelena Čvorović (as Jelena Radovic)
- Jelka Utornik
- Taško Načić
