= Malambo (1984 film) =

1984 film

- Directed by: Milan Dor
- Written by: Milan Dor
- Starring: Klaus Rohrmoser
- Cinematography: Anton Peschke
- Release date: 1984
- Running time: 93 minutes
- Country: Austria
- Language: German

Malambo is a 1984 Austrian drama film directed by Milan Dor. The film was selected as the Austrian entry for the Best Foreign Language Film at the 58th Academy Awards, but was not accepted as a nominee.

== Cast ==
- Klaus Rohrmoser as Chris
- Miodrag Andrić as Mischa
- Nirit Sommerfeld as Nada
- Dietrich Siegl as Hans
- Oliver Stern as Anatol
- Dagmar Schwarz as Rita
- Georg Trenkwitz as Martin
- Gerhard Swoboda as Peter
- Predrag Milinković as Pero

== See also ==
- List of submissions to the 58th Academy Awards for Best Foreign Language Film
- List of Austrian submissions for the Academy Award for Best Foreign Language Film
