= Hell River =

- Directed by: Stole Jankovic
- Written by: Stole Jankovic
- Produced by: Ika Panajotovic
- Starring: Rod Taylor; Adam West; Xenia Gratsos; Bata Živojinović
- Release date: 1974
- Country: Yugoslavia
- Language: English
- Budget: $2 million

Hell River, also known as Partisans (Serbo-Croatian: Partizani / Партизани) and The Last Guerilla, is a 1974 Yugoslav partisan film starring Rod Taylor as a Yugoslav raised in America who returns home to fight the Germans as a Partisan in World War II. Adam West plays a German officer.

The film was shot on location in Yugoslavia, and claims to be based on a true story. There are several versions, including an original three-hour cut made for Yugoslavian television, and a feature-length version for the American market. Rod Taylor was involved in rewriting and shooting some additional scenes during post production.

== Cast ==
- Rod Taylor as Marko
- Adam West as Capt. Kurt Kohler
- Brioni Farrell as Anna Kleitz
- Bata Živojinović as Brka
- Peter Carsten as Col. Henke
- Olivera Katarina as Mila
- Branko Pleša as Brig. Gen. Steiger
- Marinko Šebez as Sele
- Janez Vrhovec as Col. Hoffmann
- Dragomir Felba as Chicha
- Gizela Vuković as Woman Mayor
- Cane Firaunović as Lt. Schuler
- Jovan Janićijević as Machek
- Dragomir Čumić as Partisan (uncredited)
- Dragomir Stanojevic as German (uncredited)
- Zoran Stojiljković as German Officer (uncredited)
- Predrag Milinković as Jewish Refugee (uncredited)

== Legacy ==
The producer, Ika Panajotovic, was a lawyer and former tennis player who represented Yugoslavia in the Davis Cup and reached the semi-finals at Wimbledon.

Footage from Hell River was used in Once Upon a Time in Hollywood, reedited to feature Leonardo DiCaprio. The film's director, Quentin Tarantino, has been reported to be a fan of the film.
