= Maskare =

- Village
- Location within Serbia
- Coordinates: 43°40′44″N 21°22′42″E
- Country: Serbia
- District: Rasina District
- Municipality: Varvarin

Population (2002)
  - Total: 539
- Time zone: UTC+1 (CET)
  - Summer (DST): UTC+2 (CEST)

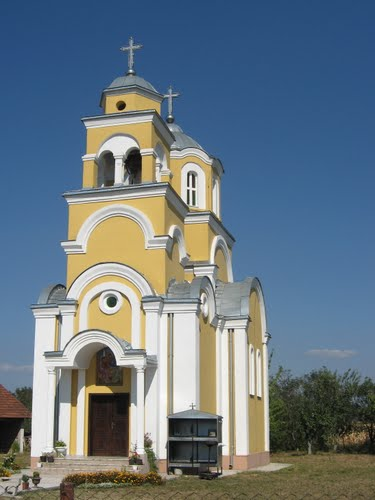
The Holy Trinity Church, in Maskare village.

Maskare is a village in the municipality of Varvarin, Serbia. According to the 2002 census, the village has a population of 539 people.

== Notable people ==
- Jovan Janićijević Burduš, Serbian actor was born in this village
