= Dragan Maksimović =

Serbian actor (1949–2001)

- Maksimović as Lazar in Time of Miracles.
- Born: 7 February 1949; Podujevo, FPR Yugoslavia (modern Kosovo)
- Died: 4 February 2001 (aged 51); Belgrade, FR Yugoslavia (modern Serbia)
- Cause of death: Beaten to death
- Resting place: Bežanija Cemetery, Belgrade
- Occupation: Actor
- Years active: 1971–2001

Dragan Maksimović (Serbian Cyrillic: Драган Максимовић; 7 February 1949 – 4 February 2001) was a Serbian actor.

== Biography ==
Maksimović (nicknamed Maks) performed in more than sixty theatrical plays, movies and TV productions, between 1971 and 1999. His debut was in National Theatre in Belgrade playing Soldier in the play Mother Courage and her Children, 1971.

On 18 November 2000, Maksimović was attacked in the Zeleni Venac neighbourhood, in day-time, by a group of FK Rad supporters (after their team lost a match against FK Obilić), who assumed he was Romani. He died on 4 February 2001 in hospital. On the initiative by film director Goran Marković, a commemorative plaque was placed at Zeleni Venac on 18 November 2006. The perpetrators were never apprehended.

== Selected filmography ==
Film
Year	Title	Role	Notes
2002	The State of the Dead	Luka Mandić	
1999	The Dagger	Zulfikar	
1998	The Wounds	Patient	
1998	The Hornet	Azem	
1996	Pretty Village, Pretty Flame	Petar	
1993	Byzantine Blue	Lovokradica	
1992	The Black Bomber	Psycho	
1992	We Are Not Angels	Hippie	
1989	Time of Miracles	Lazar	
1988	The Bizarre Country	Painter	
1981	The Fall of Italy	Rafo	
1980	Petria's Wreath	Miša	
1979	Meetings with Remarkable Men	G. I. Gurdjieff	
