= The Bizarre Country =

1988 Yugoslavia television series or program

- The DVD release cover
- Screenplay by: Dragan Marinković
- Story by: Radoje Domanović
- Directed by: Dragan Marinković
- Starring: Lazar Ristovski; Jasmina Avramović; Enver Petrovci; Žika Milenković; Branko Pleša; Dragan Maksimović; Milenko Zablaćanski
- Theme music composer: Ksenija Zečević
- Country of origin: Yugoslavia
- Original language: Serbo-Croatian

Production
- Running time: 91 min

Original release
- Network: Radio Television Belgrade
- Release: 1988

The Bizarre Country (Serbian: Neka čudna zemlja, Нека чудна земља) is a 1988 former Yugoslav drama/fantasy film based on the satirical novellas Stradija and Danga, written by Serbian writer Radoje Domanović.

== Plot ==
A man dies in a foreign land. On his deathbed he asks his son to bury his bones in his fatherland, a country of brave and honest people, a country of tragic but heroic past. His son wanders the world unsuccessfully looking for his father's home. He eventually finds the country in which people speak in his father's language, but everything else is absurd and unbelievable and does not fit his father's stories.

== Cast ==
- Lazar Ristovski as The Traveler
- Jasmina Avramović as The Blackhaired Girl
- Dragan Maksimović as The Painter
- Enver Petrovci as The New Chief of Police
- Milija Vuković as The Old Chief of Police
- Milutin Butković as The Higher Clerk of the Ministry
- Milenko Zablaćanski as The Guitarist
- Branislav Platiša as The Violinist
- Živojin Milenković as The Minister of Agriculture
- Branko Pleša as The Minister of the Foreign Affairs
- Dragoljub Milosavljević as The Minister of Finance
- Spiro Guberina as The Minister of The Inner Affairs
- Gordana Gadžić as The Painter's Sister
- Mihajlo Viktorović as The Minister of Economy
- Karlo Molnar as The Courier of the Ministry

== See also ==
- Cinema of Yugoslavia
- Cinema of Serbia
