= I Was Stronger =

- Directed by: Gustav Gavrin
- Written by: Gustav Gavrin; Rados Novakovic
- Cinematography: Mihajlo Popovic
- Edited by: Kleopatra Harisijades
- Music by: Stevan Hristic
- Production company: Avala Film
- Release date: 1953
- Running time: 70 minutes
- Country: Yugoslavia
- Language: Serbo-Croat

I Was Stronger (Serbo-Croat: Bila sam jaca) is a 1953 Yugoslav war drama film directed by Gustav Gavrin and starring Sava Severova, Mira Stupica and Nikola Popovic. The film's heroine is a Partisan doctor during the Second World War.

== Cast ==
- Sava Severova as Marija .. doktorka
- Mira Stupica as Zora
- Nikola Popovic as Nacelnik ... Zorin muz
- Rade Brasanac
- Bozidar Drnic as Apotekar
- Ivo Jaksic as Nemacki major
- Ljubisa Jovanovic
- Bozidar Marjanovic as Bora ... Zorin sin
- Miodrag Naunovic
- Fran Novakovic
- Aleksandar Ognjanovic
- Ljuba Tadic as Agent
- Mladen 'Mladja' Veselinovic

== Bibliography ==
- Alfred Krautz. International Directory of Cinematographers, Set- and Costume Designers in Film: Albania, Bulgaria, Greece, Rumania, Yugoslavia. Saur, 1983.
