= Milorad Bata Mihailović =

Serbian painter

- Born: February 8, 1923; Pančevo, Kingdom of Yugoslavia
- Died: April 23, 2011 (aged 88); Paris, France
- Known for: Painter

Milorad Bata Mihailović (8 February 1923 – 23 April 2011) was a Serbian painter.

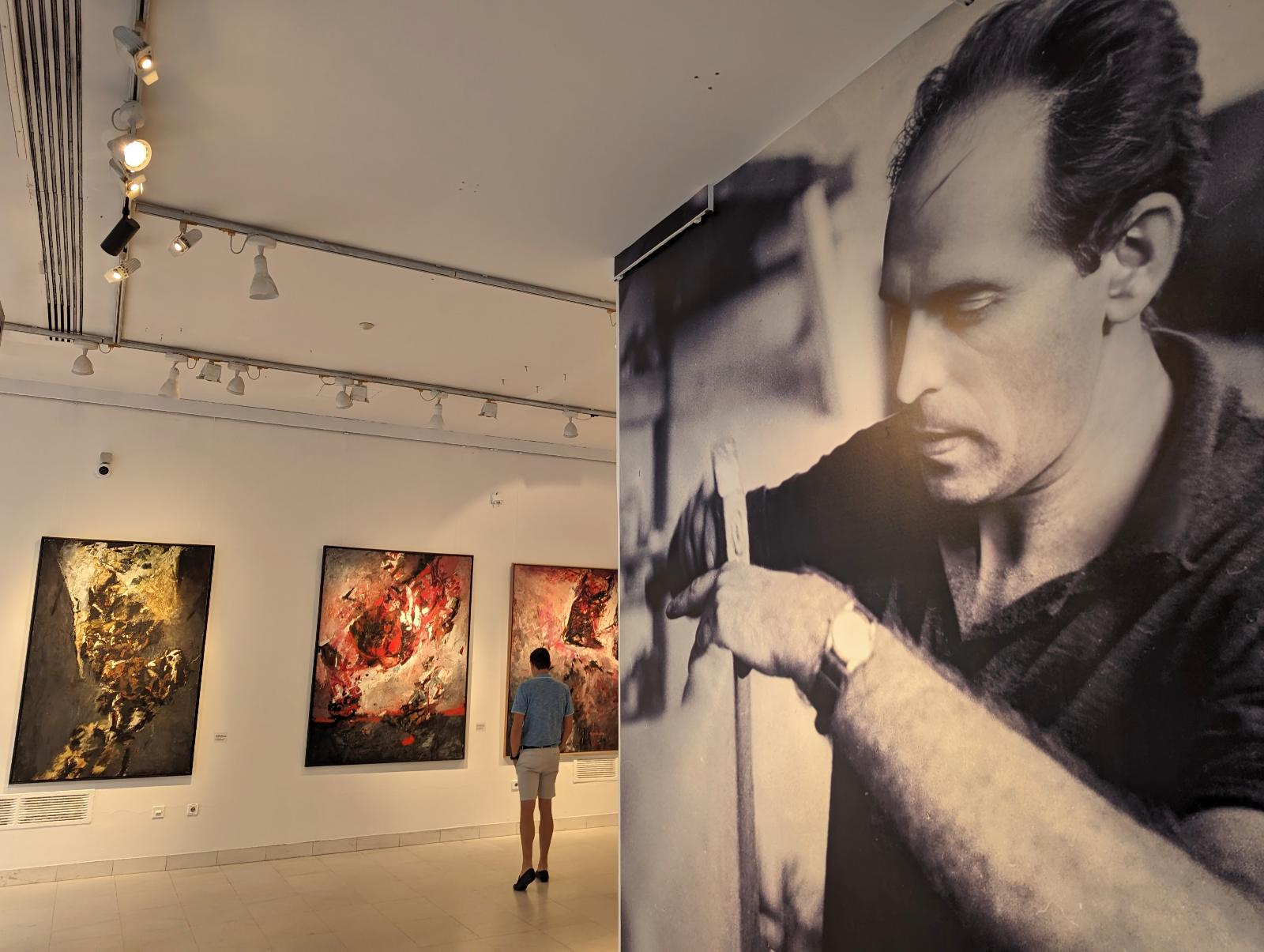
Bata Mihaliovic Centenary Exhibit

He was born in Pančevo, Belgrade oblast. Since 1946, he studied in the class of professor Ivan Tabaković at the Faculty of Fine Arts of the University of Arts in Belgrade. One year later, Mihalović went to Zadar and was one of young Serbian painters who founded the art commune Zadarska grupa. The group comprised also young and gifted painters such as Mića Popović, Ljubinka Jovanović, Petar Omčikus, Kosara Bokšan, Vera Božičković and Mileta Andrejević. He worked and lived in Zadar from March to August 1947. In 1951, he was one of the founders of the art group Eleven (Jedanaestorica grupa) in Belgrade.

Mihailović left Yugoslavia and went to Paris with his wife Ljubinka Jovanović in May 1952. In the following decades, he lived and worked alternately in Paris and Belgrade. In 1985, Mihailović was elected member of Serbian Academy of Sciences and Arts. He received October Award (Oktobarska nagrada) in 1989. Mihailović died in Paris in 2011. The Serbian Academy of Sciences and Arts marked the centenary of his birth with the exhibition titled 'Milorad Bata Mihailović: On the Occasion of the Birth of an Academician Rebel' held at the SASA Gallery, May 30 - August 13, 2023.

== Work and solo exhibitions (selection) ==
Mihailović was one of the first representatives of Serbian postmodern Art. He painted landscapes, still lifes, portraits, self-portraits and interiors. His painting was influenced by Expressionism and abstract Art. Since 1947, when he first exhibited in Belgrade, Mihailović had about one hundred group exhibitions on all continents. In 1951, his first solo exhibition was arranged in Belgrade and a retrospective at Cvijeta Zuzorić Art Pavilion in 1981.

- Galerie Rive Gauche Paris in 1957, 1958, 1959 and 1968.
- Galerie Jeanne Bucher Paris in 1958.
- Galerie Ariel Paris in 1961, 1966, 1970, 1974, 1980 and 1985
- Galerie Nova Spectra The Hague in 1962.
- Galerie Le Zodiaque Brussels in 1963.
- Galerie Birch Copenhagen in 1964.
- Salon Muzej Savremene Umetnosti Belgrade in 1965.
- Galerie Nord Lille in 1967 and 1970.
- Galleri Haaken Oslo in 1969.
- Galleri Eklund Umeå (Sweden) in 1975.
- Galerie Médicis Ostend (Belgium), Kunsthandel M. L. de Boer Amsterdam and Galleri Galax Gothenburg in 1976.
- Galerie Nadar Casablanca in 1978 and 1983.
- Galerija likovnih umetnosti poklon zbirka Rajka Mamuzića Novi Sad in 1979.
