= Dušan Jakšić =

Serbian-Yugoslav actor and singer (1927–2009)

- Душан Јакшић
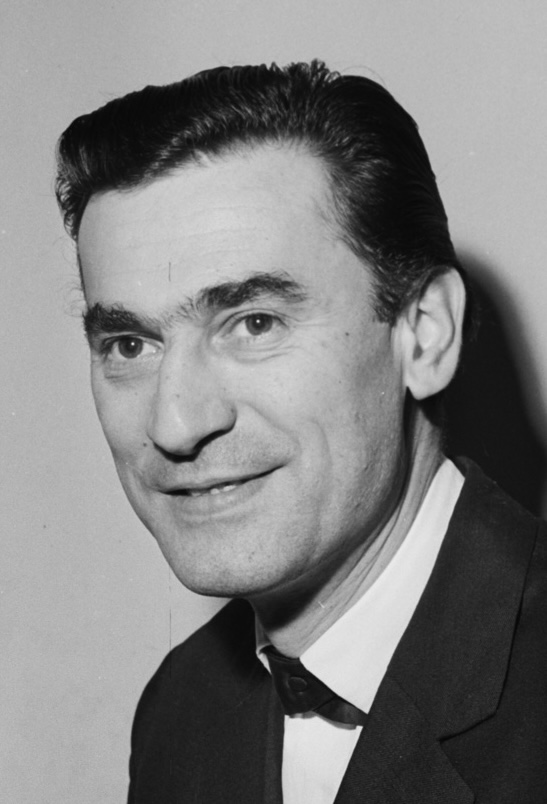
- Jakšić in the 1960s, photographed by Stevan Kragujević
- Born: June 5, 1927; Karlovac, Kingdom of Yugoslavia
- Died: December 17, 2009 (aged 82); Belgrade, Serbia
- Education: Faculty of Dramatic Arts, University of Arts in Belgrade
- Occupations: Actor, singer
- Years active: 1950–2005

Dušan Jakšić (Serbian Cyrillic: Душан Јакшић, 5 June 1927 – 17 December 2009) was a Serbian and Yugoslav singer and actor. He gained popularity in Yugoslavia with his mid-century covers of old town songs, schlagers, chansons and jazz songs. He recorded around 80 records and cassettes and performed at numerous concerts within Yugoslavia and abroad. He has been likened to Yves Montand.

== Biography ==
Jakšić was born in 1927 in Karlovac, then Kingdom of Yugoslavia. At the age of 17, during the Second World War, he was drafted to the Syrmian Front. After the war, at the age of 18, he moved to Belgrade to pursue acting, where he first studied singing at the Music Academy of the University of Belgrade, and then transferred to the Theatre Academy (today's Faculty of Dramatic Arts), where he was taught by Bojan Stupica.

Jakšić started his acting career in 1950 at the Yugoslav Drama Theatre. He subsequently performed at the Novi Sad Theatre, and in 1953 he landed his first role at the Belgrade Drama Theatre. In 1971 he became a member of the National Theatre in Belgrade, where he would perform until his retirement in 1990. His first screen role was in Mića Popović's 1966 film The Swarm. He also participated in the entertainment shows that were part of Radio Belgrade's "Veselo veče".

Jakšić's began his singing career in 1954, after his singing at a party in the headquarters of the paper Borba impressed Dule Radetić, the music director of Radio Belgrade. In 1955 he achieved fame with the schlagers Noćas nisu sjale and Žarko Petrović's Sve moje jeseni su tužne. He soon started performing at domestic and international festivals. In 1958, he performed M. Biro's More, more at the Opatija music festival, which won him the 1st prize of the listeners of Radio Belgrade and the 2nd prize of the listeners of Radio Zagreb. At the Belgrade Spring festival in 1964, his composition Čerge, written by Lj. Despotović, won the 1st audience award.

Jakšić died of cancer at the age of 82 on 17 December 2009 in Belgrade.

== Selected discography ==
- Karolina, daj (SANREMO '61) EPY3098
- Ja sam simpatičan / Napunite mi času / Zemlja srca mog / Svet / EP50243
- Jednom se živi / Žaklin / Dečak iz predgradja / Sneg / EPY3743
- Kad dođe noć / Za dva poljupca / Zbogom drugovi / Niko na svetu / EP50241
- Kristinka / Ja sam vjetar / SY1048
- Luna nad morem / Manuela/ SY1137
- Mali Gonzales / Suze ljubavi / SY1211
- Maliziusella / Torero / Chitarra romana / Ti-pi-tipso / EPY3033
- Marina / Biću opet tu / Julija / Kad prođe sve / EPY3063
- Noćas nisu sjale (zvezdice na nebu) / Moja mala nema mane / Jesen stiže dunjo moja / Al' je lep ovaj svet / P17116
- Raskršće / Dosvidanja / Sevastopoljski vals / Oproštaj sa gitarom/ EPY3244
- Sad znanci smo samo / Trojka / SY1032
- Tamo daleko / Teci, Dunave / Nebo je tako vedro / Jesenje lišće/ Izdavač/ EPY3453
- Tri godine sam te sanjao / Tuga rastanka / Podmoskovske večeri / Kad bi moja bila/ EPY3058
- Usamljena harmonika / Marinika / Reka bez povratka / Zračak nade / EPY3010
- Vrati se / Priča o crnim očima / Melodie d'amour / Pesma mladosti / EPY3060

== Selected filmography ==
- The Swarm (1966)
- Citizens of the Village Lug (1972)
- The Red Garden (1973)
- Old Belgrade (1981)
- The Honorary Duty (1986)
- Love Stars (2005)

== Awards ==
- Zlatni Beočug, the highest annual recognition of the Cultural and Educational Association of Belgrade (1976)
- Annual Award of the National Theater (1976)
- 3 plaques of the Meritorious Citizen of Belgrade
- Medal of Merit for the People
- Order of Labor with a Golden Wreath
- Order of Merit for the People with Silver Wreath
- Golden badge of the Tourist Association of Belgrade.
