= Petar Omčikus =

Serbian painter (1926–2019)

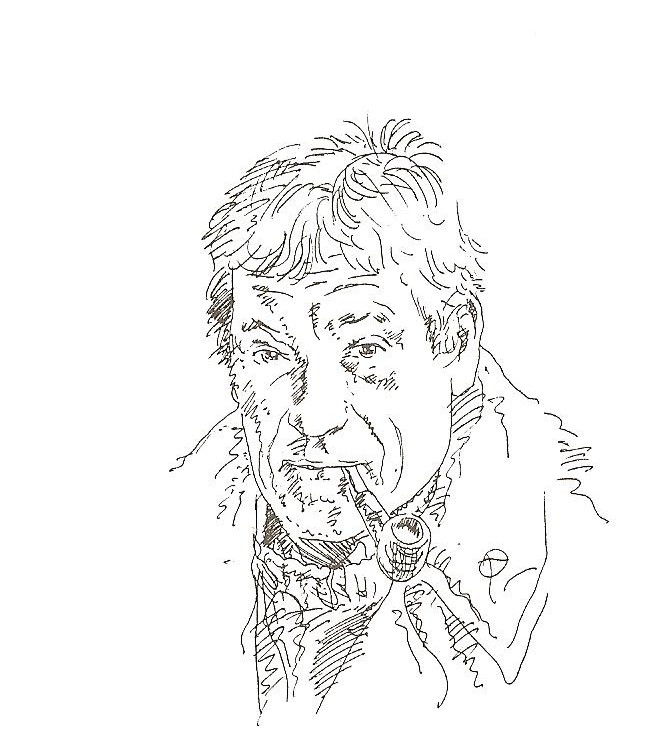
- Born: 6 October 1926; Sušak, Kingdom of Serbs, Croats, and Slovenes
- Died: 26 April 2019 (aged 92); Belgrade, Serbia
- Known for: Painter

Petar Omčikus (French: Pierre Omcikous; Serbian Cyrillic: Петар Омчикус; 6 October 1926 – 26 April 2019) was a Serbian painter and member of the Serbian Academy of Sciences and Arts, who lived and worked in Paris, France.

== Biography ==
Omčikus was born in Sušak, Rijeka, at the time in the Kingdom of Serbs, Croats, and Slovenes. Since 1937, Omčikus lived in Belgrade. After World War II, he began painting at the Academy of Fine Arts, in class of professor Ivan Tabaković. Together with his wife, painter Kossa Bokchan, he left his studies in painting, went to Zadar, and became one of the founders of the Zadar Group, where there were also Mića Popović, Vera Božičković, Bata Mihailović, Ljubinka Jovanović and Mileta Andrejević. After a six-month stay in Zadar, he returned to Belgrade where he joined the Group of Eleven, and had his first solo exhibition, hosted in 1951. Shortly after, in 1952, Petar Omčikus and Kossa Bokshan left from Yugoslavia and moved to Paris. Since 1965, they occasionally stayed in Vela Luka on Korčula, where they organized numerous international meetings of artists, philosophers and critics.

He had solo exhibitions in Paris, Lille, Rome, Geneve, Podgorica, Novi Sad, Zagreb and elsewhere, also participating in numerous group exhibitions at home and abroad. Omčikus was elected a full member of the Serbian Academy of Sciences and Arts in 2015.

== Art ==
The beginnings of Omčikus creativity are related to several artists, all from the class of Ivana Tabaković, which is a few months together in Zadar 1947 making the first Yugoslav artistic commune – Zadar Group: Omčikus, his future wife Kossa Bokchan, Mića Popović, Vera Božičković, Bata Mihailović, Ljubinka Jovanović, Mileta Andrejević, Bora Grujić and their friend, student of literature Borislav Mihajlović Mihiz. Rise of the academic nature in the studio for the artists opened up new paths in which are free creativity will, in different ways, to remain during the whole of his creation. Omčikus in the 1951 joins The Group of Eleven who encourages him to continue searching for their own creative paths, then still in the domain of poetic figuration after socialist realism. But the real turning point in his art happened in Paris. Meeting with the abstract art of the time definitely Omčikus directed towards free expression, a move that he is not looking for reality but for individual style. Geometrized associative abstraction of the period but from the beginning of the seventh decade evolved into colorful gestural figuration, which has retained elements of his earlier term. In the later stages of the Omčikus thematisation painting on the portraits, drawings of Belgrade, fantastic realism, and sculpture.

== Solo exhibitions (international selection) ==
- 1951 Art Gallery ULUS, Belgrade
- 1955 Galerie Arnaud, Paris
- 1958 Galerie Jeanne Bucher, Paris
- 1962 Galerie Formes Contemporaines, Lille
- 1965 Salon of Moderne Gallery, Belgrade
- 1972 Grand Palais, Paris
- 1974 Galleria 'IlGrifo', Rome
- 1976 Galerie de Seine, Paris
- 1983 Galerie Plexus, Chexbres (Switzerland)
- 1985 Galerie des Platanes, Genève
- 1988 Galerie Plexus, Chexbres (Switzerland)
- 1989 Museum of contemporary art, retrospective exhibition, Belgrade
- 1992 Maison de l'UNESCO, Paris
- 1994 Bibliothèque Universitaire, Nancy
- 1995 Galerie René Descartes: 'Atelier Dedouvre', Paris
- 1996 Galerie Plexus: 'Atelier Dedouvre', Chexbres (Switzerland)
- 1998 Gallery SANU, Belgrade

== References (international selection) ==
- Michel Seuphor, Dictionnaire de la peinture abstraite, p.p. 235, Fernand Hazar, Paris, 1957
- Luc Menaše, Evropski umetnostno zgodovinski leksikon, p.p. 1526, Mladinska knjiga, Ljubljana, 1971
- George Boudaille, Pour un art d'expression. Pierre Omcikous, Les Lettres Françaises, Paris, 3 mai, 1972
- Gérald Gassiot Talabot, Omcikous, Opus International No 36, Paris, juin 1972, p.p. 64-65
- Anne Tronche, Pierre Omcikous, Opus International No 61-61, Paris, janvier-fevrier 1977, p.p. 108-109
- Georges Haldas, Un grand espace pour l'homme à propos de l'oeuvre de Pierre Omcikous, Repères, Genève, No 8, 1984, p.p. 174-179

== Sources ==
- Documentation Museum of Contemporary Art, Belgrade
- Petar Omčikus, monograph, Gallery of Serbian Academy of Sciences and Arts, Belgrade, 1998
