= Ljubinka Jovanović =

Serbian painter

- Born: October 6, 1922; Belgrade, Kingdom of Yugoslavia
- Died: August 3, 2015; Paris, France
- Known for: Painter

Ljubinka Jovanović (French: Lybinka Jovanovich; Serbian Cyrillic: Љубинка Јовановић; 6 October 1922 in Beograd – 3 August 2015) was a Serbian painter who lived and worked in Paris and Belgrade. She was strongly influenced by the iconic traditions of the Serbian medieval art and inspired by the Serbo-Byzantine style of painting, developed in a modern style with specific signs on her chromatic paintings.

== Biography ==
Ljubinka Jovanović was studying painting at the Academy of Fine Arts in Belgrade in the class of Professor Ivan Tabaković. With her future husband, Milorad Bata Mihailović, and his friends from the class Mića Popović, Petar Omčikus, Kossa Bokchan and Vera Božičković Popović, in 1947 she went to Adriatic Coast where they formed an art commune “Zadar group”. She was also a member of the groups "Eleven" and "Lada".

Starting in 1951, Ljubinka Jovanović had numerous solo and group exhibitions in Serbia and abroad, including Belgrade, Paris, New York, Rouen, Bilbao, Čačak, Nikšić, and Budva. With Bata Mihailović she moved to Paris in 1952, and worked between Belgrade and Paris for several decades. She died in Paris, France, on 3 August 2015.

== Art ==
Like most members of the postwar generation of Serbian painters, Ljubinka Jovanović went through several phases, but compared to others hers were less dramatic in terms of stylistic changes. Basically, she always relied on the power of color in the painting and paid less attention to form. In her paintings, after the neo-abstract period, by the end of the 1960s, the shape had a close and direct origin in the asceticism of medieval Serbian fresco and icon painting. Based on such visuality, she created one of the most recognizable works in Serbian contemporary art of the late 20th century.

== Solo exhibition (selection) ==
- 1952 Galerija ULUS, Belgrade
- 1953 Galerie Marseille, Paris
- 1964 Galerie Ariel, Paris
- 1965 Galerie Peintres du Monde, Paris, Long Island University, New York City
- 1967 Salon Muzeja savremene umetnosti, Belgrade
- 1976 Galerie de la ville, Rouen
- 1977 Galerie Aritza, Bilbao
- 1977 Galerie Toroves, Santiago, Galerie Rive gauche, Paris
- 1980 Arcus, Paris
- 1981 Moderna galerija, Budva
- 1990 Umetnički paviljon „Cvijeta Zuzorić“, Belgrade (retrospective)
- 1992 Savremena galerija Centra za kulturu, Pančevo
- 1995 Galerija “Nadežda Petrović”, Čačak
- 1996 Galerija „Nikola I“, Centar za kulturu, Nikšić
- 1998 Galerija Haos, Belgrade
- 2000 Galerija Rajka Mamuzića, Novi Sad
- 2002 Galerija Centra za kulturu, Despotovac
- 2003 Moderna galerija, Budva
- 2006 Galerija RTS, Belgrade
- 2010 Serbian Cultural Center, Paris (retrospective)

== Bibliography (selection) ==
- 1962 Georges Boudaille, Le Salon de Mai: Le goût de notre temps, Lettres françaises, du 10 au 16 mai, Paris
- 1964 Jean-Jacaues Lévêque, Les merveillex univers de Lybinka, Galerie Ariel, Lettres françaises, février, Paris
- 1964 Raoul-Jean Moulin, Lybinka, Cimaise, No 67, p.78, Paris
- 1964 Jean-Jacaues Lévêque, Lybinka - Galerie Ariel, Arts, mars, Paris
- 1964 Jean-Jacaues Lévêque, Lybinka - Galerie Ariel, La Galerie des arts, 15 avril, p. 33, Paris
- 1965 Georges Boudaille, (pref), Galerie Peintres du Monde, Paris
- 1965 Raoul-Jean Moulin, (pref), Catalogue de l'exposition personelle à la Galerie Peintres du Monde, novembre, Paris
- 1965 Georges Boudaille, Fascination du réel, Les Arts, 11 novembre, Paris
- 1965 Jean-Jacaues Lévêque, L'artiste est-il un piège à images? Arts, du 10 au 16 novembre, Paris
- 1965 Jean-Jacaues Lévêque, Icônes modernes, Arts, 11 novembre, Paris
- 1965. Raoul-Jean Moulin, (pref), Trois peintres de Paris: Lybinka, Bitran, Mihailovitch, Umeo, (La Suède)
- 1965 Jeanne Rollin, Nature et paysages, Humanité, 26 novembre, Paris
- 1966 Jannine Lipsi, Lybinka, Beaux-Arts, 20 janvier, Paris

== Sources ==
- Documentation of the Museum of Contemporary Art, Belgrade
- Ljubinka Jovanović, monograph, Karić Foundation, Belgrade, 2002
- http://www.ccserbie.com/lybinka.pdf%5B%5D
