= Miodrag B. Protić =

Serbian artist (1922–2014)

- Born: Miodrag Protić; 10 May 1922; Vrnjačka Banja, Kingdom of Yugoslavia
- Died: December 20, 2014 (aged 92); Belgrade, Serbia
- Known for: painting

Miodrag B. Protić (Serbian Cyrillic: Миодраг Б. Протић; 10 May 1922 – 20 December 2014) was a Serbian painter, art critic, theorist and historian of art of the 20th century.

== Biography ==
Miodrag B. Protić was born in Vrnjačka Banja, on 10 May 1922. He finished elementary school in Vrnjačka Banja and high school in Kruševac. He graduated from University of Belgrade Faculty of Law in 1950. He studied art in Art School of Mladen Josić in 1943–1944 under Jovan Bijelić and Zora Petrović. Protić gained further education in Paris 1953–1954, in Italy and the United States in 1963. From 1950 to 1959 he worked in the Ministry of Education, Science and Culture when he initiated the establishment of Modern Art Gallery in Belgrade, purchasing artwork from exhibitions and artist studios. He was appointed director of the Modern Art Gallery in 1959. On 20 October 1965, the Modern Art Gallery became the Museum of Contemporary Art in Belgrade. Protić, as its founder, continued as its head until he retired in 1980. He began exhibiting in 1946 in numerous group exhibitions at home and abroad. His first solo exhibition was in 1956. He was a member of ULUS from 1948. He was a member of artistic groups "The Independent" (1951–1955) and "The December Group" (1955–1960). Beginning in 1952 he published a number of books, papers, essays, and critiques on Serbian and Yugoslav art. He was a regular art critic for "NIN" between 1952 and 1958. He commentated for numerous newspapers and magazines, including "Glas", "Rad", "Politika", "Borba", "Danas", "Delo", "Savremenik", "Književnost", "Letopis Matice srpske", "Književne novine", and "Umetnost". He was a member of the Yugoslav Academy of Sciences and Arts in Zagreb from 1966 to 1991. He died on 20 December 2014 in Belgrade

== Bibliography ==
=== Books and monographies ===
- 1955 Savremenici I, Nolit, Beograd
- 1957 Sreten Stojanović, Prosveta, Beograd
- 1958 Milan Konjović, Forum, Novi Sad
- 1959 Milo Milunović, Prosveta, Beograd
- 1960 Slika i smisao, Nolit, Beograd
- 1964 Savremenici II, Nolit Beograd
- 1966 Jovan Bijelić, Jugoslavija, Beograd
- 1969 Dvadeseti vek, Umetničko blago Jugoslavije, Jugoslavija, Beograd
- 1970 Srpsko slikarstvo XX veka, I-II, Nolit, Beograd
- 1972 Milena Pavlović Barili, Prosveta, Beograd
- 1973 Jugoslovensko slikarstvo 1900–1950, BIGZ, Beograd
- 1976 Vladimir Veličković, Pière Belfond, Paris (in French)
- 1979 Oblik i vreme, Nolit, Beograd
- 1979 Protić-Šutej, Biškupić, Zagreb
- 1980 — 1981 Ideje srpske umetničke kritike i teorije 1900–1950, I-III, Muzej savremene umetnosti, Beograd
- 1982 Skulptura XX veka, Jugoslavija, Beograd, Spektar, Zagreb, Prva književna komuna, Mostar
- 1982 Slikarstvo XX veka, Jugoslavija, Beograd, Spektar, Zagreb, Prva književna komuna, Mostar
- 1985 Sava Šumanović, Galerija „Sava Šumanović“, Šid
- 1985 Slika i utopija, Srpska književna zadruga, Beograd
- 1986 Milica Zorić, Jugoslovenska revija, Beograd
- 1986 Vladimir Veličković, Prosveta, Književne novine, Beograd, Mladinska knjiga, Ljubljana
- 1992 Nojeva barka I, Srpska književna zadruga, Beograd
- 1993 Srbi u evropskoj civilizaciji, Nova, Beograd
- 1994 Istorija srpske kulture, Forum, Novi Sad
- 1995 Otmica Evrope, Gradska narodna biblioteka „Žarko Zrenjanin“, Zrenjanin
- 1996 Nojeva barka II, Srpska književna zadruga, Beograd
- 2002 Nojeva barka I-II, Srpska književna zadruga, Beograd
- 2009 Nojeva barka III, Srpska književna zadruga, Beograd

=== Catalog prefaces (selection) ===
- 1951 Petar Lubarda, ULUS, Beograd
- 1956 Decembarska grupa, Umetnički paviljon, Sarajevo; Umetnički paviljon, Beograd
- 1960 Zora Petrović, Umetnički paviljon, Beograd
- 1960 Milan Konjović, Galerija Doma JNA, Beograd
- 1961 Nedeljko Gvozdenović, Salon Moderne galerije, Beograd
- 1962 Milena Pavlović Barili, Galerija Milene Pavlović Barili, Požarevac
- 1963 Peđa Milosavljević, Salon Muzeja savrememe umetnosti, Beograd
- 1965 Milorad Bata Mihailović, Salon Moderne galerije, Beograd
- 1966 Marko Čelebonović, Muzej savremene umetnosti, Beograd
- 1967 Predrag Peđa Nešković, Salon Muzeja savremene umetnosti, Beograd
- 1967 Petar Lubarda, retrospektiva, Muzej savremene umetnosti, Beograd
- 1967 Treća decenija – konstruktivno slikarstvo, Muzej savremene umetnosti, Beograd
- 1968 Jovan Bijelić, retrospektiva, Muzej savremene umetnosti, Beograd
- 1968 Peđa Milosavljević, Umetnička galerija, Sarajevo
- 1968 Umetnici XX veka akademici, Galerija SANU, Beograd
- 1969 Nadrealizam i socijalna umetnost 1929–1950, Muzej savremene umetnosti, Beograd
- 1969 Decembarska grupa 1955–1960, Galerija Kulturnog centra, Beograd
- 1969 — 1970 Lazar Vozarević, retrospektiva, Muzej savremene umetnosti, Beograd
- 1970 Nedeljko Gvozdenović, retrospektiva, Muzej savremene umetnosti, Beograd
- 1971 Četvrta decenija – ekspresionizam boje i poetski realizam 1930–1940, Muzej savremene umetnosti, Beograd
- 1971 Ivan Radović, Galerija SANU, Beograd
- 1972 Srpska arhitektura 1900–1970, Muzej savremene umetnosti, Beograd
- 1972 Leonid Šejka, retrospektiva, Muzej savremene umetnosti, Beograd
- 1972 — 1973 Počeci jugoslovenskog modernog slikartsva 1900–1920, Muzej savremene umetnosti, Beograd
- 1973 Od enformela do nove figuracije, Galerija Kulturnog centra, Beograd
- 1974 Petar Dobrović, retrospektiva, Muzej savremene umetnosti, Beograd
- 1975 Jugoslovenska skulptura 1870–1950, Muzej savremene umetnosti, Beograd
- 1975 Srpski umetnici akademici, Galerija SANU, Beograd
- 1975 Lazar Vozarević, Galerija savrememe umetnosti, Niš
- 1977 Ivan Tabaković, retrospektiva, Muzej savremene umetnosti, Beograd
- 1978 Jugoslovenska grafika 1900–1950, Muzej savremene umetnosti, Beograd
- 1978 Predrag Peđa Milosavljević, retrospektiva, Muzej savremene umetnosti, Beograd
- 1979 Milena Pavlović Barili, retrospektiva, Muzej savremene umetnosti, Beograd
- 1980 Jugoslovensko slikarstvo šeste decenije, Muzej savremene umetnosti, Beograd
- 1981 Bogdan Bogdanović, Galerija SANU, Beograd
- 1984 Sava Šumanović, retrospektiva, Muzej savremene umetnosti, Beograd
- 1985 — 1986 Jugoslovenska grafika 1950–1980, Muzej savremene umetnosti, Beograd
- 1990 Vane Bor, Muzej savremene umetnosti, Beograd
- 1993 — 1994 Legat Marka Ristića, Muzej savremene umetnosti, Beograd

== Awards ==
- 1967 Silver Medal of Merit of Czechoslovak Socialist Republic
- 1977 Order of Commander of Kingdom of Denmark
- 1981 Order of Merits for the People with Gold Star (I rank) of Socialist Federal Republic of Yugoslavia
- 1983 Order of Arts and Letters (Officer) of France

== Reading ==
1. Ješa Denegri, Radmila Matić Miodrag B. Protić, 2002
