= Dietrich Siegl =

Austrian actor (born 1954)

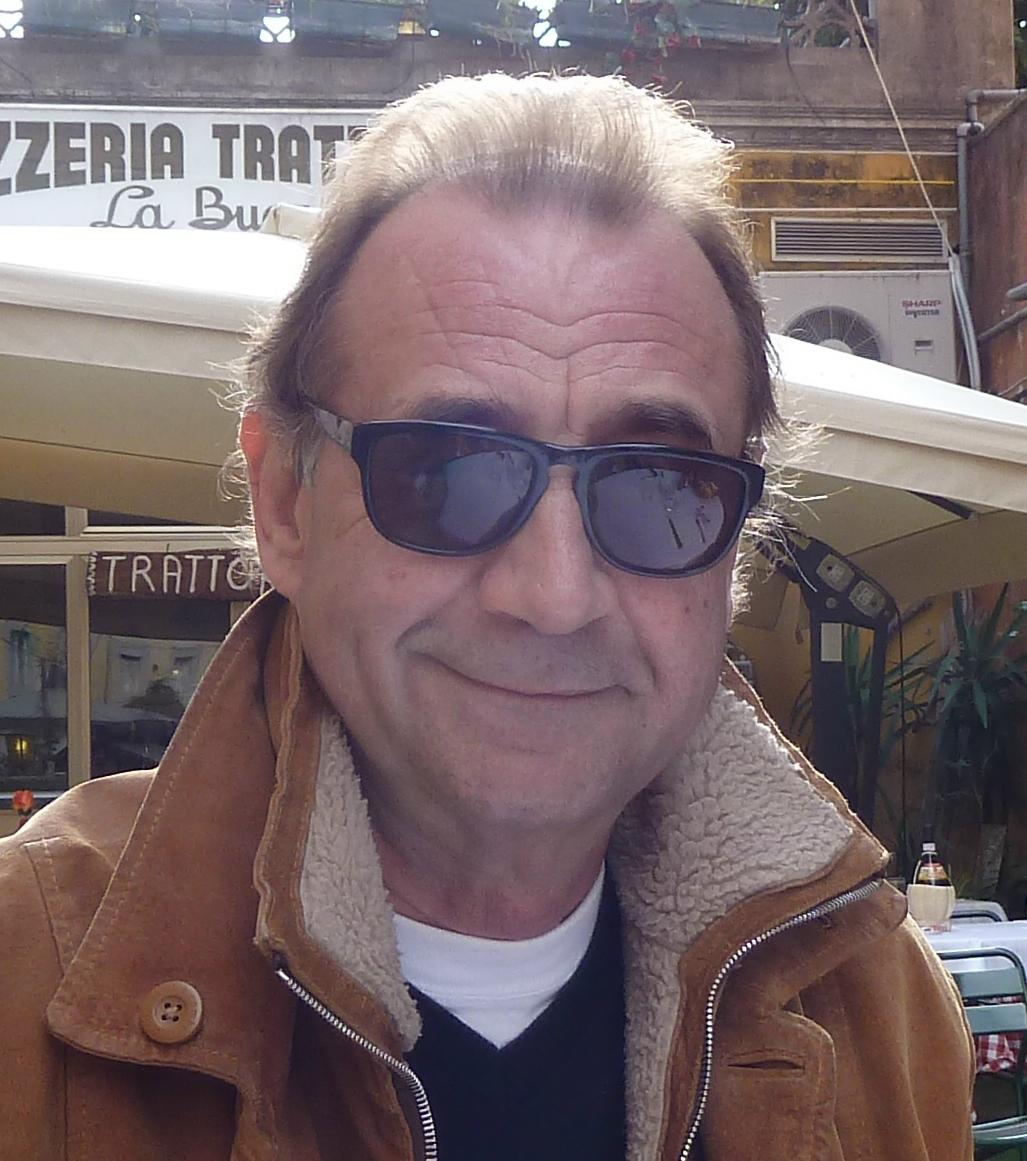
- Dietrich Siegl in 2011.
- Born: 18 March 1954 (age 72); Vienna, Austria
- Occupation: Actor
- Years active: 1981–present

Dietrich Siegl (born 18 March 1954) is an Austrian actor. He has appeared in more than sixty films since 1981. His parents, Ingrid Burkhard and Hannes Siegl, were both actors.

== Selected filmography ==
Year	Title	Role	Notes
1993	Justice	Dr. Benno	
1984	Malambo	Hans	
