= Moment (film) =

1978 film

- Directed by: Stole Janković
- Written by: Antonije Isakovic; Stole Janković
- Starring: Velimir 'Bata' Zivojinovic
- Cinematography: Bozidar Miletic
- Release date: 24 July 1978
- Running time: 102 minutes
- Country: Yugoslavia
- Language: Serbian

Moment (Serbian: Трен, translit. Tren) is a 1978 Yugoslav war film directed by Stole Janković. It was entered into the 11th Moscow International Film Festival where Bata Živojinović won the award for Best Actor.

== Cast ==
- Velimir 'Bata' Zivojinovic as Arsen
- Radko Polič as Dositej
- Pavle Vuisić as Ljuba Kvrga
- Svjetlana Knezević as Slovenian Woman
- Peter Carsten as The German from Vrsac
- Marinko Šebez as Jovan Grabljanovic-Isus
- Dragan Nikolić as Novak
- Vesna Malohodžić as Novak's Girlfriend
- Dušan Janićijević as Café Owner
