= Živojin Milenković =

Serbian actor

- Живојин Миленковић
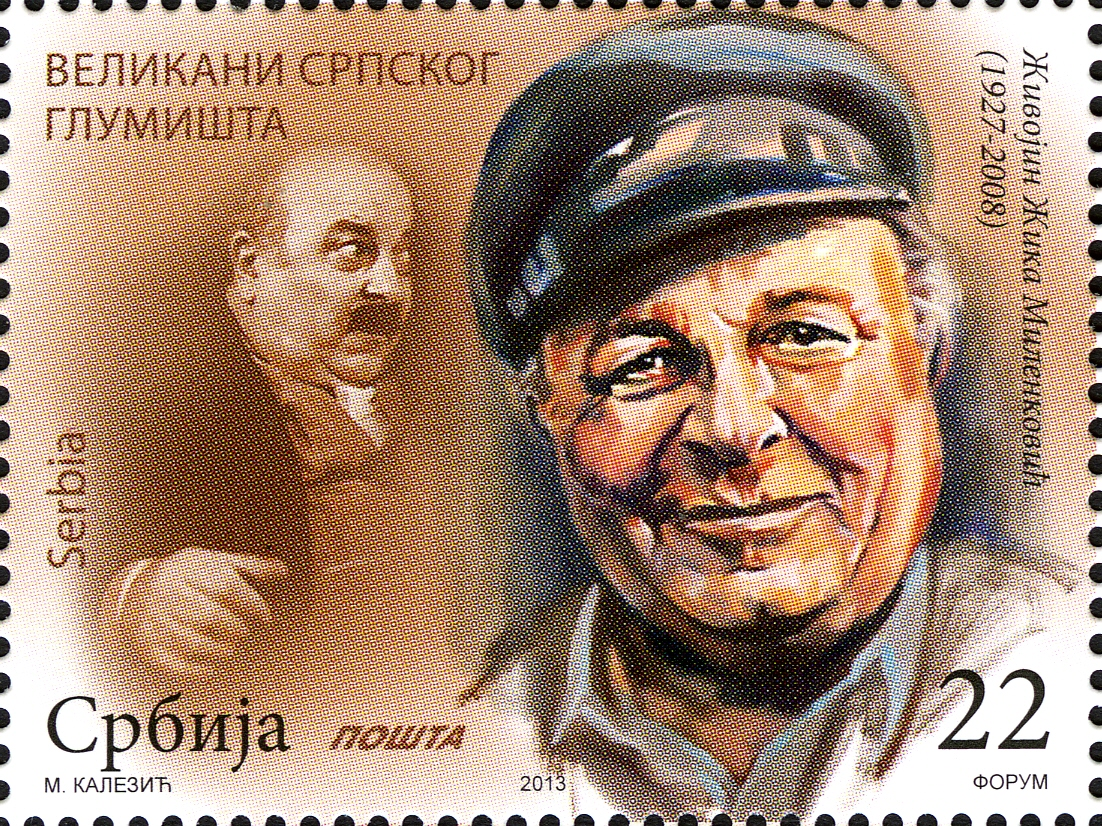
- 2013 Serbian stamp commemorating Živojin Milenković
- Born: 26 January 1928; Niš, Kingdom of Serbs, Croats, and Slovenes
- Died: 18 March 2008 (aged 80); Belgrade, Serbia
- Occupation: Actor
- Years active: 1959–2004

Živojin "Žika" Milenković (Serbian Cyrillic: Живојин "Жика" Миленковић: 26 January 1928 – 18 March 2008) was a Serbian actor. He appeared in more than one hundred films from 1959 to 2004.

== Selected filmography ==
Year	Title	Role	Notes
1988	The Bizarre Country		
1988	Tesna koža 3		
1984	Strangler vs. Strangler		
1983	How I Was Systematically Destroyed by an Idiot		
1993	Policajac sa Petlovog brda		
