= Mladen Josić =

Serbian painter

Mladen Josić Младен Јосић
- Born: 15 July 1897; Bečej, Austria-Hungary
- Died: 1 November 1972 (aged 75); Paris, France
- Known for: Painting

Mladen Josić (15 July 1897, Bečej - 1 October 1972, Paris) was a Serbian painter. He had his own atelier in Belgrade where art students came to hone their skills, many becoming renowned academic painters and sculptors.

== Biography ==
Mladen Josić was born in Bečej on 15 July 1897. His family were from Opovo in Banat. In 1920. he studied in Académie de la Grande Chaumière under Antoine Bourdelle. On return to Yugoslavia architect Dragiša Brašovan builds an atelier for him. Josić paints portraits of king Peter I of Serbia and king Alexander I of Yugoslavia. In 1937. Josić opened his own art school within Ilija M. Kolarac Endowment, from which many artists have emerged, including Mladen Srbinović, Matija Vuković, Stojan Ćelić, Majda Kurnik, Miodrag B. Protić, Zora Petrović and many others. School was closed by Tito's government in 1950. In early 1950s Josić emigrated to France. He lived in Paris until he died in 1972. He is buried with his wife Asja Josić in the Montparnasse Cemetery in Paris.

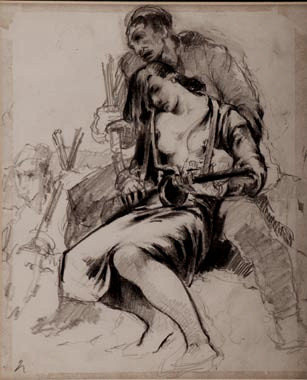
Mladen Josić - Partizan nosi ranjenu partizanku

His son, Aljoša Josić, was an architect and a painter.

== Style ==
Josić was influenced originally by Cubism, and later by Realism. Many of his works were inspired by those of the French painters Cézanne and Gauguin.

== Works ==
- King Peter I of Serbia, portrait, oil on canvas
- King Alexander I of Yugoslavia, portrait, oil on canvas
- 1953 Dubrovnik Cathedral, oil on canvas, 60 x 80 cm.

== See also ==
- List of painters from Serbia
