= Dragomir Felba =

Serbian actor (1921–2006)

- Born: 7 July 1921; Skopje, Yugoslavia, South Serbia
- Died: 13 July 2006 (aged 85); Belgrade, Serbia
- Occupation: Actor
- Years active: 1948–2000

Dragomir Felba (Serbian Cyrillic: Драгомир Фелба; 7 July 1921 – 13 July 2006) was a Serbian actor. He appeared in more than one hundred films from 1948 to 2000.

== Selected filmography ==
Year	Title	Role	Notes
1960	Kapò		
1962	Kozara		
1966	Count Bobby, The Terror of The Wild West		
1968	U raskoraku		
1968	Gates to Paradise		
1968	The Tough Ones		
1972	Traces of a Black Haired Girl		
1974	Hell River		
1975	Backbone		
1976	Beach Guard in Winter		
1978	The Tiger		
1979	National Class Category Up to 785 ccm		
1983	Great Transport		
2000	Shadows of Memories		
