= Stole Janković =

- Born: Stojiljko Janković; 6 April 1925; Belgrade, Kingdom of Yugoslavia
- Died: 19 April 1987 (aged 62); Belgrade, Yugoslavia (present-day Serbia)
- Occupations: Film director, screenwriter
- Years active: 1958–1980

Stole Janković (Serbian Cyrillic: Столе Јанковић, 6 April 1925 – 19 April 1987) was a Serbian film director and screenwriter.

== Career ==
In a career spanning more than two decades between the late 1950s and early 1980s Janković is mainly known for directing a number of partisan films and television series produced by Avala Film and Radio Television Belgrade. His 1958 film The Sky Through the Trees was entered into the 1st Moscow International Film Festival. His 1978 film Moment was entered into the 11th Moscow International Film Festival.

== Filmography ==
- The Sky Through the Trees (Kroz granje nebo, 1958)
- Partisan Stories (Partizanske priče, 1960)
- The Girl in the Park (Višnja na Tašmajdanu, 1968)
- Hell River (1974)
- Tren (Moment, 1978)
