= Lugavčina =

- Village (Selo)
- Location within Serbia
- Coordinates: 44°31′08″N 21°04′06″E
- Country: Serbia
- District: Podunavlje District
- Municipality: Smederevo

Population (2022)
  - Total: 2,516
- Time zone: UTC+1 (CET)
  - Summer (DST): UTC+2 (CEST)

Lugavčina is a village in the municipality of Smederevo, Serbia. As of 2022, the village has a population of 2,516 people.
