= Mića Popović =

Serbian painter and experimental filmmaker

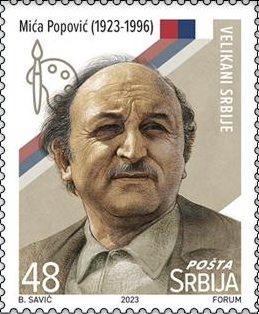
Popović on a 2023 stamp of Serbia

Miodrag "Mića" Popović (12 June 1923 – 22 December 1996) was a Serbian painter, experimental filmmaker and one of the major figures of the Yugoslav Black Wave.

== Life and work ==
Popović was born on 12 June 1923 in Loznica. He finished grammar school in Belgrade. After the Second World War, most of which he spent in Belgrade working at odd jobs, he enrolled the Academy of Fine Arts in Belgrade in 1946. He studied under Ivan Tabaković. Together with Bata Mihajlović, Petar Omčikus, Mileta Andrejević, Ljubinka Jovanović, Kosara Bokšan, and his future wife Vera Božičković-Popović, he went to Zadar in 1947 and formed the famous "Zadar group". After returning to Belgrade, they were forbidden to return to their university studies, as the authorities viewed the work of the Zadar group as subversive, but sometime later, they were all allowed to return except for Popović, who continued to study on his own.

He was the first post-war painter in Belgrade to organize an independent exhibition in 1950. During the following several years he mostly lived in Paris, where he had his solo exhibit in 1953. As a painter, Popović is best known for his informel period (1958–1968) and his "Scenes Painting" (slikarstvo prizora) (from 1968). Among the Scenes Paintings, one of the more notable ones was "May 1, 1985," which memorialized events surrounding an alleged attack on a farmer in Kosovo named Đorđe Martinović.

He also made several films in the 1960s, two of which ("Čovek iz hrastove šume" and "Delije") were banned by the government for their antisocialist content.

Mića Popović was elected a regular member of the Serbian Academy of Sciences and Arts in 1986. The Serbian Academy of Sciences and Arts marked the centenary of his birth with the exhibition titled ‘Mića Popović – The Art of Permanent Rebellion’, held at the SASA Gallery, September 5 - November 5, 2023.

Cultural event Mićini i Verini dani (Mića and Vera's Days) was established in Loznica on June 12, 2001 and has been held annually since then.

== Written works ==
- Sudari i harmonije (1954)
- U ateljeu pred noć (1962)
- Ishodište slike (1983)
- Velika ljubav Anice Huber (1999)
- Putopisni dnevnici (2006)

== Films ==
- The Man from the Oak Forest (1964)
- The Swarm (1966)
- Hasanaginica (1967)
- The Tough Ones (1968)
- Burduš (1970)

== Paintings ==
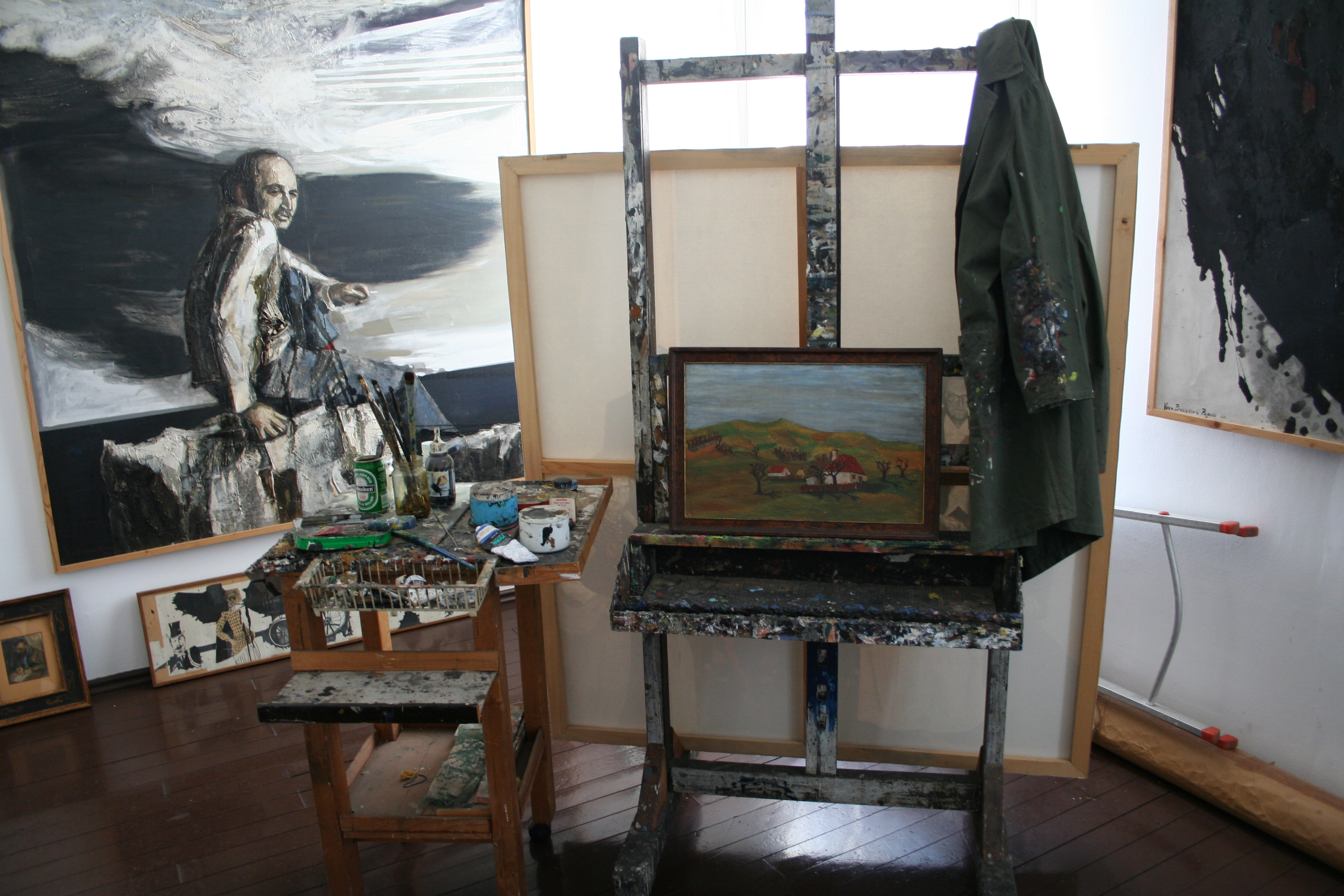
Mića Popović Gallery in Loznica

A significant collection of his painting is exhibited in Mića Popović and Vera Božičković-Popović Gallery, located in the artist's hometown of Loznica. The gallery artworks span over five decades of his work, starting with Great-great-grandfather’s House in Loznica (1936), when Mića was only thirteen years old. Other representative works include Citizens (1949) and Gvozden's Graph (1970), all the way to Great Still Life (1989).
