= Jovan Janićijević Burduš =

Serbian actor

- Born: 18 May 1932; Maskare, Kingdom of Yugoslavia
- Died: 26 February 1992 (aged 59); Belgrade, Yugoslavia
- Occupation: Actor
- Years active: 1956-1992

Jovan Janićijević Burduš (18 May 1932 – 26 February 1992) was a Yugoslav actor. He appeared in more than ninety films from 1956 to 1992.

== Filmography ==
Year	Title	Role	Notes
1956	Potraga		
1957	Subotom uvece		(segment "Svira odlican dzez")
1958	Te noci	Dusan	
1959	Dubrowsky	Stiva	
1959	As the Sea Rages		
1962	Seki snima, pazi se		
1962	Lady MacBeth Siberiana		
1962	The Steppe	Salomon	
1962	Macak pod sljemom	Brico	
1963	Dve noci u jednom danu	Nikola	
1964	The Shoot	Manach	
1963	Uncle Tom's Cabin		
1963	The Oil Prince	Bandit	Uncredited
1963	Ko puca otvorice mu se		
1966	Count Bobby, The Terror of The Wild West	Kiddy	
1966	Vreme ljubavi		(segment "Put")
1966	Povratak	Boki	
1966	Vojnik		
1967	Praznik	Narednik Katic	
1967	Deca vojvode Smita		
1967	The Demolition Squad	Gavran	
1968	Sirota Marija	Vojin drug	
1968	U raskoraku		
1968	Comandamenti per un gangster	Sir John	
1968	Delije	Isidor	
1968	Kad golubovi polete	Riletov otac	Voice, Uncredited
1968	Bekstva	Strazar	
1968	Ima ljubavi, nema ljubavi		
1969	Bog je umro uzalud	Otac blizanaca	Voice, Uncredited
1969	The Bridge	Svercer	
1969	Veliki dan	Bifedzija	
1969	Sramno leto		
1969	Nizvodno od sunca	Nikola Bakic	
1970	Burdus	Burdus	
1970	Zarki	Zarki	
1972	Walter Defends Sarajevo	Josic / Stric	
1972	I Bog stvori kafansku pevacicu		
1973	Mirko i Slavko	Kovac	
1974	Kosava	Adamov kum	
1974	Hell River	Machek	
1975	Crvena zemlja	Borislav Katanic	
1975	Pavle Pavlovic	Vlasnik restorana	
1977	Special Education	Majstor Hranislav	
1977	Hajka	Todocilo	
1981	Lov u mutnom	Pera	
1984	Moljac	Ujka	
1984	Kamiondzije opet voze	Caca Ciganin	
1984	Nema problema	Portir Nicifor	
1988	Sekula i njegove zene	Noca	
1989	Seobe		
1989	Vampiri su medju nama	Pogrebnik Jova	
1989	Uros blesavi		
1990	Cubok		
1991	Svemirci su krivi za sve	Jova	
1991	Sekula se opet zeni	Noca	
1992	Prokleta je Amerika	Komandir stanice milicije	
1992	Velika frka	Jovan	
1992	Lady Killer	Jova	(final film role)
