= Zora Petrović =

Serbian artist

Zora Petrović (May 17, 1894, in Dobrica – May 25, 1962, in Belgrade) was a Serbian painter. Her notable works can be seen in the Museum of Contemporary Art in Belgrade and in Pavle Beljanski Memorial Collection in Novi Sad.

== Biography ==
Petrović attended high school in Pančevo from 1907 to 1909. In 1912, she enrolled at the Belgrade Arts and Crafts School, where she studied under Milan Milovanović, Đorđe Jovanović and Marko Murat.

She then studied painting in Budapest under professor Lajos Deák Ébner and took courses from professors Pál Szinyei Merse and Istvan Reti of the Barbizon in Nagybanya artists' colony and school, considered very influential in Hungarian and Romanian art. From 1915 to 1919, she studied at the Hungarian Royal Drawing School and Art Teachers' College (what became the Hungarian University of Fine Arts) under the guidance of professor Lajos Deák Ébner. She returned to Belgrade in 1919 to attend the Arts and Crafts Painting School with professor Ljubomir Ivanović. After, she worked as a teacher in a Belgrade college, and from 1921 to 1944, she taught at the Second Women's Gymnasium "Queen Natalia". From 1925 to 1926, she lived in Paris where she worked in the studio André Lhote for a year.

She worked as a drawing teacher at the atelier of Mladen Josić School of Painting and as a part-time professor of painting from 1942 to 1944. In 1952, she received a job at the Academy of Fine Arts in Belgrade and worked there for the rest of her life. She died in Belgrade on May 25, 1962, and was buried in Pančevo.

Her awards include Oktobarska nagrada (1956) and Orden Svetog Save (1958).

== Painting ==
As she was unmarried and did not have her own family, Petrović devoted all of her free time to painting. Her oil and watercolor paintings often depict poverty, particularly peasant women from various regions of Serbia. While her works include landscapes, still life, and other motifs, she was primarily a painter of female figures.

From early in her career, Petrović's painting style did not follow the traditions of European women artists. Her style is noted as individualistic, with use of bold colors and heavy brushstrokes.

== See also ==
- List of painters from Serbia
