= Miodrag Andrić =

Serbian actor

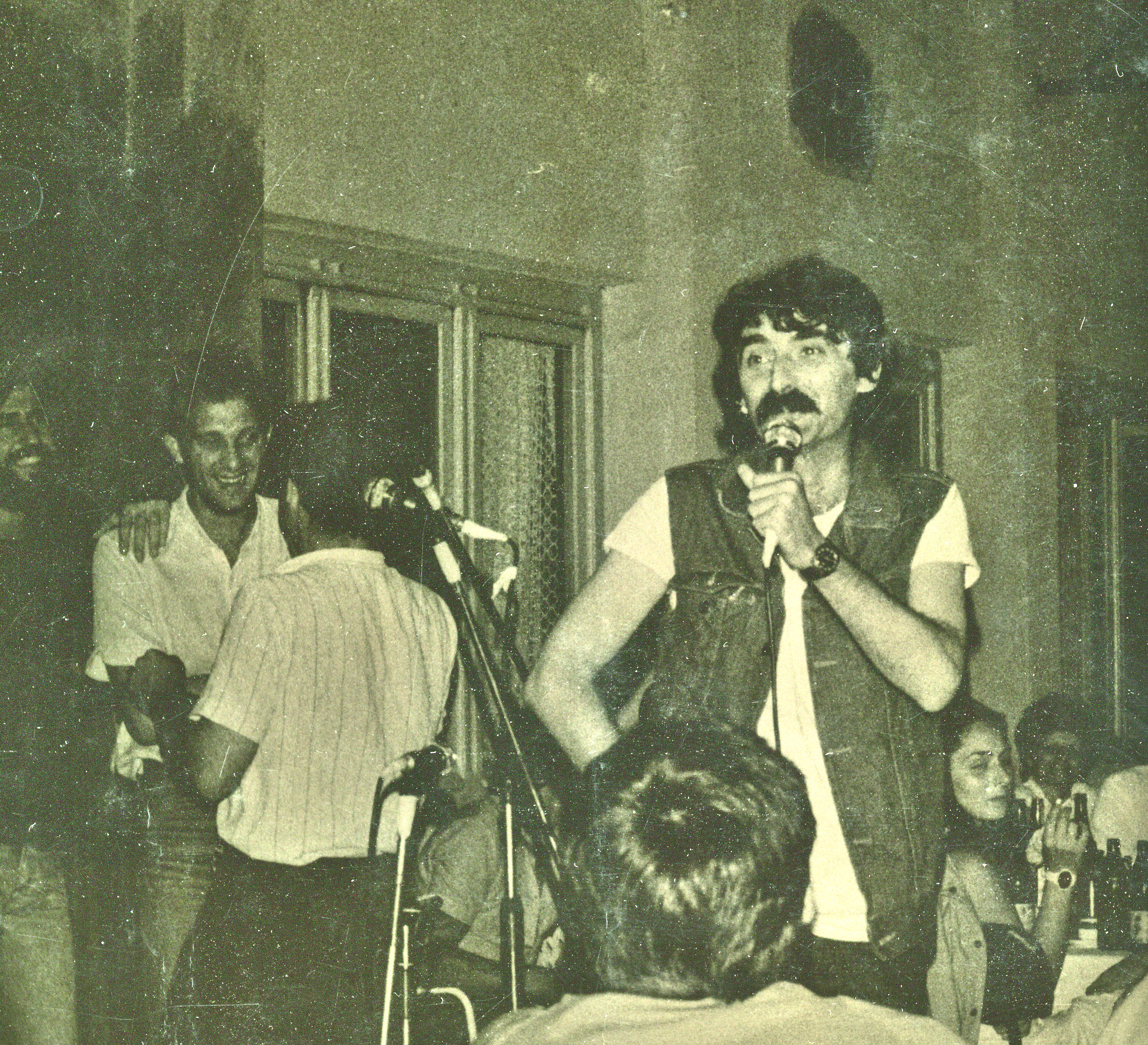
- Serbian Actor Miodrag Andrić, alias Ljuba Moljac, 1982
- Born: 28 January 1943; Kragujevac, German-occupied Serbia
- Died: 22 January 1989 (aged 45); Glina, SR Croatia, SFR Yugoslavia
- Occupation: Actor
- Years active: 1963–1989

Miodrag Andrić (28 January 1943 – 22 January 1989), commonly known by his nickname Ljuba Moljac (Ljuba The moth), was a Serbian actor. He appeared in more than sixty films from 1963 to 1989.

== Selected filmography ==
Year	Title	Role	Notes
1966	The Climber		
1967	Love Affair, or the Case of the Missing Switchboard Operator		
1971	W.R.: Mysteries of the Organism		
1984	Malambo		
