= Kossa Bokchan =

Serbian painter

- Born: 1925; Berlin, Germany
- Died: 2009 (aged 83–84); Belgrade, Serbia
- Known for: Painter

Kossa Bokchan (Serbian Cyrillic: Косара Бокшан, January 1, 1925 in Berlin – November 21, 2009 in Belgrade) was a Serbian painter who lived in Paris. She married Petar Omčikus (Pierre Omcikous).

== Education ==
In 1928, when Bokchan was three, her parents moved to Belgrade. During World War II, as a teen, she studied painting with Mladen Josić and in 1944, at the studio of Zora Petrović. Afterwards, Bokchan enrolled at the Academy of Fine Arts in Belgrade, in the class of Ivan Tabaković. Others in the class included Petar Omčikus (Bokchan's future husband), Mića Popović, Bata Mihailović, Vera Božičković, Ljubinka Jovanović and Mileta Andrejević.

== Career ==
In 1947, Bokchan joined a post-war Yugoslav art commune, Zadarska grupa (Zadar's group). Bokchan first exhibited her work in 1950. Her first solo exhibition was 1952. Bokchan then moved to Paris with Petar Omčikus. She made Paris her home and had her first exhibition there in 1954. From 1960, she made regular summer trips to Vela Luka on Korčula. Bokchan has exhibited in Lille, Paris, Strasbourg, Rome, Nancy, Novi Sad, Niš, Zagreb, Skopje and Titograd. The Museum of Contemporary Art in Belgrade held a Bokchan retrospective in 2001. From 5 March 2010 to 27 April 2010, the Serbian cultural centre in the Latin quarter of Paris held a Bokchan retrospective. Bokchan was also published as an illustrator.

== Art ==
Kossa Bokchan's painting has changed over time. One early stage was her transition from socialist realism to genres outside that dogma such as landscapes and portraits. This was evident in her first exhibition. She also moved away from genres taught at the Academy which she described as "still life and skeletons". Bokchan's style belongs to the school of expressive realism. Her move to Paris began her stylistic journey towards contemporary art trends, especially geometric and lyrical abstraction and from there towards the informal. After 1961, Bokchan returned to realism as determined by 'The Paris School'. Michel Ragon, art historian, suggested this was a type of abstract naturalism. Bokchan's art is also influenced by the Byzantine tradition. Bokchan transforms mythical symbols into artistic expression.

== Awards ==
- 1968 Ministry of Culture and Communication, Paris
- 2000 Special Award on VI International Biennial of Miniature Art, Gornji Milanovac

== Bibliography (selection) ==
- Jean-Clarence Lambert, Actualité, Opus international, No 8, Paris, 1968
- Georges Boudaille, 'Yougoslave 68', rendez-vous international, Les lettres françaises, No 1248, s. 24-27, Paris, 1968
- Jeanine Warnod, Grâce a un mécénat populaire, une petite île yougoslave crée la ville de la mosaïque, Le Figaro, Paris, 1968
- Georges Boudaille, Le Salon de Mai 1969, Les lettres françaises, No 1284, s. 21-27, Paris, 1960
- Jeanine Warnod, Rencontre d'artistes à Vela Luka, Le Figaro, Paris, 1970
- Jean Senac, Les fermes solaires de Kossa Bokchan, Opus international, No 18, s. 19-20, Paris, 1970
- Gerald Gassiot Talabot, Vela Luka actualités, Opus international, No 21, s. 53-56, Paris, 1970
- Gerald Gassiot Talabot, Sur une île dalmate, Annales, Paris, 1970
- Joseph Ryckwert, La Bienalle de Vela Luka suit isola di curzola Yugoslavia, Domus, No 491, Milano, 1970
- Georges Boudaille, Giorgio di Genova, Galleria 'il Grifo (pref) Rome, 1974
- Anne Tronche, 'Face a Femmes', (pref), Le Havre, 1978
- Georges Boudaille, Anne Tronche, (pref), Nancy, 1995

== Sources ==
- Museum of Contemporary Art, Belgrade
- Kosara Bokšan, a retrospective exhibition catalog, Museum of Contemporary Art, Belgrade, 2001
