= Dušan Janićijević (actor) =

Serbian actor

- Born: 27 April 1932; Gornje Grgure, Kingdom of Yugoslavia
- Died: 5 July 2011 (aged 79); Gornje Grgure, Serbia
- Occupation: Actor
- Years active: 1954–2011

Dušan Janićijević (27 April 1932 – 5 July 2011) was a Serbian actor. He appeared in more than one hundred films from 1954 to 2011.

== Filmography ==
Year	Title	Role	Notes
1968	U raskoraku		
1968	The Tough Ones		
1969	The Bridge		
1977	The Dog Who Loved Trains		
1977	Operation Stadium		
1978	Moment		
1983	Body Scent		
1983	Great Transport		
