= Mladen Srbinović =

Serbian painter (1925–2009)

Mladen Srbinović (Sušica near Gostivar, 29 November 1925 — Belgrade, 12 May 2009) was a Serbian painter, member of the Arts and Sciences academies of Serbia and Macedonia and professor of Belgrade University.

== Biography ==
Mladen Srbinović was born in 1925 in the village of Sušica near Gostivar in a local Serb family. Srbinovićs moved to Belgrade in 1930 where Mladen finished primary school and high school. He continued his studies at the Art Academy, graduating in 1951. In the same year he became assistant professor at the Academy, later on becoming a professor and teaching until 1988.

His first exhibited his paintings in 1948 and had a solo exhibition in 1952. Later in his career he represented Yugoslavia on many exhibitions abroad. He is one of the founders of the "December Group" (1955). He published two "graphic maps" inspired by the verses of Lorka. Parallel with his painting and graphic art from 1960 Srbinović started working on mosaics and tapestries which predominated in the later part of his life. During his career he won many prestigious awards including Oktobarska nagrada (twice, 1958 and 1974) and Sedmojulska nagrada (1984).

In 1980s Srbinović got engaged in politics. He was one of the members of the Committee for the Defense of Freedom of Thought and Expression created by writer Dobrica Ćosić in 1984. Srbinović was also among the founders of the Democratic Party (although he left it soon afterwards) and a member of a crown council of prince Aleksandar of Serbia. In the period in which the regime of Slobodan Milošević was in power (1989-2000), he denounced all official awards.

== Works ==
His famous mosaics adorn Palace "Serbia" in Belgrade (1962), Town Museum of Sarajevo (1966), Municipal Council in Kruševac (1971 and 1988), medical center in Gamzigradska Banja spa (1975), Church of St Nicholas in Ruma (1985), Investbanka in Belgrade (1989), Monastery of Žiča (1993) etc. He also made stained glass windows of the grand hall of the Serbian Academy of Sciences and Arts.

Mladen Srbinović won the second prize for painting at the prestigious São Paulo Biennial in 1961, where he represented Yugoslavia. Paintings such as "Woman with a Raised Arm" marked his oeuvre and characterized the phase that dominated his work at the time. Three years later, Mladen Srbinović represented Yugoslavia again, this time at the 31st Venice Biennale, where he exhibited 20 large-format works, mostly measuring 145 x 170 cm. The painting "The Secret of Red / Il segreto di rosso" was printed on the cover of the exhibition catalogue curated by Katarina Ambrozić. Mladen also took part in the Tokyo International Print Biennale, where his large lithograph "September" won first place. His oil on canvas "Painting with Inscriptions" was exhibited at a group exhibition of Yugoslav artists in Rimini in 1963.
