= Danilo Stojković =

Serbian actor

Bata Stojković
- Бата Стојковић
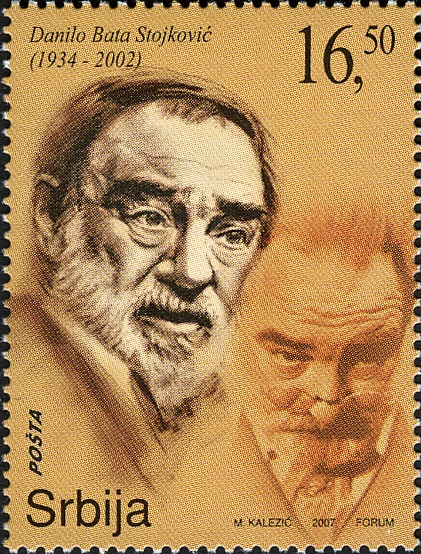
- Stojković on a 2007 Serbian stamp
- Born: Danilo Stojković; 11 August 1934; Belgrade, Kingdom of Yugoslavia
- Died: 16 March 2002 (aged 67); Belgrade, FR Yugoslavia
- Occupation: Actor
- Years active: 1964–2002

Danilo Stojković (Serbian Cyrillic: Данило Стојковић; 11 August 1934 – 16 March 2002), commonly nicknamed Bata (Бата), was a Yugoslav and Serbian theatre, television and film actor.

Stojković's numerous comedic portrayals of state officials and working-class characters made him popular with Serbian and ex-Yugoslav audiences. Most of his roles came in collaborations with either director Slobodan Šijan or scriptwriter Dušan Kovačević, or both.

== Career ==
=== Early career ===
Stojković was born in Belgrade in 1934. By the mid-1960s, he became a well-known theatre actor. He started his film career with the 1964 feature Izdajnik (lit. "The Traitor").

A string of TV and minor film roles ensued, with the most important ones coming in guise of being a father figure to the main protagonist – Čuvar plaže u zimskom periodu (Beach Guard in Winter, 1976), Pas koji je voleo vozove (The Dog Who Loved Trains, 1977) being the most recognizable ones – as well as the part in critically well-received Majstor i Margarita (Il Maestro e Margherita), 1972.

He also fulfilled the fatherly role in an immensely popular TV show Grlom u jagode. The show originally aired in 1975 and kept finding its audience through numerous reruns in the 1980s and the 1990s. He also played the minor antagonist in Goran Marković's urban classic Nacionalna klasa do 750 cm^{3} (National Class Category Up to 750 ccm), 1979.

=== Breakthrough ===
Stojković worked with the director Slobodan Šijan, who was in turn most successful when working with Dušan Kovačević scripts. Kovačević, a talented playwright with a special gift for biting satire, had a knack for writing characters which Stojković could perfectly translate to screen. The combination of those three creative talents yielded some of Yugoslavia's most memorable cinematic efforts to date.

Šijan, who previously worked with Stojković on several TV productions, made his big screen debut with Ko to tamo peva (Who's Singing Over There?, 1980), a farcical comedy set at the beginning of World War II in then Yugoslavia. In a strong cast ensemble, Stojković distinguished himself with role of a Germanophile bus passenger on the way to Beograd in the eve of 5 April 1941 – the day Belgrade was bombed by the Axis powers marking Yugoslavia's entry into the war.

Ko to tamo peva was released to great critical and commercial success, earning the special jury award at the Montreal World Film Festival in Canada. The success of Ko to tamo peva opened new doors for Stojković, who then established his film star status with a number of critically acclaimed roles. He appeared in Goran Paskaljević's dark comedy about rehab from alcoholism, Poseban tretman (Special Treatment), 1980.

He reunited with Šijan for another high-water mark of Serbian film, the black comedy Maratonci trče počasni krug (Marathon Family). The film, a humorous piece about a family whose undertaking business is being threatened by the local mobster was another smash success for Šijan and Stojković, and achieved cult status. He also voiced Stromboli in the Serbian-language version of Pinocchio.

=== Marxists, spies and revolutionaries ===
After a couple minor roles, from which his turn as the school principal in comedy Idemo dalje (lit. Moving On, 1982) deserved some mention, Stojković delivered a trio of performances which would ultimately cement his place in the Yugoslavian acting hall of fame. Oddly enough, all three of those roles would involve him portraying a character closely related to the communist ideals – or better said, satirizing a stereotype of "party men" or "marxist revolutionaries".

First was his portrait of a homeless wannabe revolutionary Babi Pupuška, in Šijan's Kako sam sistematski uništen od idiota (How I Got Systematically Destroyed by an Idiot, (1983), a story about a man who embarks on a soul-searching journey after hearing the, for him at least, shattering news of Che Guevara's demise. Stojković portrayed another dysfunctional Marxist father figure in Goran Paskaljević's elegiac Varljivo leto '68 (The Elusive Summer of '68, 1984).

Again uniting his talents with those of Dušan Kovačević, Stojković delivered his ultimate film performance – that of the staunch Stalinist and a full-time paranoid in Balkanski špijun (Balkan Spy, 1984), which was jointly directed by Božidar Nikolić and Kovačević himself. With Kovačević at his sharpest, Stojković made the role of ex-political prisoner Ilija Čvorović completely his own. Critics often single out this role as Stojković's most notable.

== Late years and death ==
His role in Balkanski špijun was one of the last major theatrical roles for Stojković. After his major successes of the early 1980s, Stojković concentrated mainly on television and theatre, with an odd supporting role here and there. He was effective in both Vreme čuda (lit. Time of the Miracles, 1989) and Sabirni centar (The Collective Center), and had a memorable cameo in Balkan Express 2 (1989). His most famous theatrical role was that of Luka Laban, in another Kovačević play, Profesionalac (lit. "The Professional"). He played the role until a few days before his death. In an interview in 2007 his wife told that she drove him from the hospital to his last plays and returned him to the hospital bed after the play.

In the 1990s, Stojković cameoed in Crni bombarder (The Black Bomber, 1992), and had minor roles in movies such as Emir Kusturica's Underground (1995) and Darko Bajić's Balkanska pravila (Balkan Rules, 1997).

Ironically enough, one of his final theatrical roles was one of an orthodox priest – a character who Babi Pupuška and Ilija Čvorović would probably despise – in Lazar Ristovski's 1999 effort Belo odelo ("The White Suit"). After that, he appeared in an omnibus feature called Proputovanje (Traveling, 1999) and starred in a TV adaptation of the August Strindberg's play The Father for Radio-televizija Srbije – RTS (Otac, 2001).

Stojković died in Belgrade on 16 March 2002, after a bout with lung cancer.

== Awards and legacy ==
Throughout his lifetime, Stojković was the recipient of the Serbian Lifetime Achievement Award for both theatrical (Dobričin prsten, 1990) and cinematic (Pavle Vujisić, 1998) efforts. He remains as popular in death as he was in life, as his characters have entertained numerous generations of Serbo-Croatian speakers. His numerous comedic portrayals of state officials and working-class characters made him popular with Yugoslav audiences.

== Selected filmography ==
=== Selected television ===
Year	Title	Role	Notes
1966	Večeras improvizujemo Rajkina		TV movie
1966	Mladi Duhovi	General Rozdenstvenski	TV movie
1966	Rodjendan	Otac	TV movie
1967	Probisvet		TV series; 1 episode
1967	Krug dvojkom		TV series; 2 episodes
1967	Ovo zene posle rata		TV movie
1967	Stara koka, dobra juha		TV movie
1968	Gorski car		TV series; 3 episodes
1968	Bekstvo	Tihi	TV movie
1968	Jednog dana, jednom čoveku		TV movie
1969	Samci 2	Vita Sukletic	TV series; 1 episode
1969	Rađanje radnog naroda	Bangela Kukuljevic	TV series; 2 episodes
1971	Ceo život za godinu dana	Steva Bajic	TV series; 3 episodes
1972	Cela pevacica	Vatrogasni kapetan	TV movie
1973	Beograd ili tramvaj a na prednja vrata		TV movie
1976	Grlom u jagode		TV series; 10 episodes
1977	Nikola Tesla	George Westinghouse	TV series; 3 episodes
1979	Djetinstvo mladosti		TV series; 3 episodes
1980	Pripovedanja Radoja Domanovica		TV series; 10 episodes
1982	Sijamci	Djura Mitrovic	TV mini-series; 5 episodes
1983	Ucitelj	Bozur	TV mini-series; 7 episodes
1985	Srebrena lisica	Cavce	TV movie
1986	Svecana obaveza	Stevan	TV movie
1996-1997	Gore dole	Avram Jaksic	TV series; 32 episodes

=== Selected film ===
Year	Title	Role	Notes
1964	Čovek iz hrastove šume	Stevan	
1964	Izdajnik		
1965	Čovek nije tica		
1966	Roj	Nikola	
1968	U raskoru	Postar	
1970	Burduš	Roditelj	
1971	The Role of My Family in the Revolution	Strogi	
1971	Young and Healthy as a Rose	Vaculić	
1972	Majstor i Margarita	Bobov	
1976	Čuvar plaže u zimskom periodu	Milovan Pasanović - Draganov otac	
1977	Pas koji je voleo vozove	Otac	
1979	Nacionalna klasa do 750 cm^{3}	Cabor	
1980	Special Treatment	Steva	
1980	Who's Singin' Over There?	Brka	
1982	Maratonci trče počasni krug	Laki Topalovic	
1983	Kako sam sistematski uništen od idiota	Babi Papuska	
1984	Varljivo leto '68	Veselin Cvetkovic	
1984	Balkanski špijun	Ilija Cvorovic	
1989	Sabirni centar	Simeun	
1989	Balkan Express 2	Mida	
1989	Time of Miracles	Jovan	
1992	Crni bombarder	Presednik	
1995	Underground	Deda	
1997	Balkan Rules	Sajdzija	
1999	Belo odelo	Svestenik	
