= The Farm in the Small Marsh =

The Farm in the Small Marsh (Serbian: Salas u Malom Ritu) may refer to:

- The Farm in the Small Marsh (film), 1976 Yugoslav film
- The Farm in the Small Marsh (TV series), 1975 Yugoslav TV series
- Ja sam rođen tamo na salašu, Serbian patriotic song
