= The Farm in the Small Marsh (film) =

- Directed by: Branko Bauer
- Based on: The Farm in the Small Marsh by Branko Bauer; Salaš u Malom Ritu by Arsen Diklić
- Starring: Slavko Štimac; Miodrag Radovanović
- Release date: 4 February 1976
- Running time: 126 min
- Country: Yugoslavia
- Language: Serbo-Croatian

The Farm in the Small Marsh (Serbian: Салаш у Малом Риту / Salaš u Malom Ritu) is a 1976 Yugoslav teen drama film directed by Branko Bauer, and based on the eponymous television series, which is in turn based on the eponymous novel by Arsen Diklić. There is a sequel film, Wintering in Jakobsfeld, extending the story.

== Plot ==
The film follows Milan Maljević (Slavko Štimac), a teenager from a fictional Banatian village called Mali Rit (Little Swamp) during World War II.

== Cast ==
- Slavko Štimac - Milan Maljević
- Miodrag Radovanović - Šicer
- Pavle Vuisić - Paja
- Renata Ulmanski - Majka
- Miroljub Lešo - Pera
- Ljubomir Živanović - Vasa
- Milan Kuruzović - Branko
- Stole Aranđelović - Skeledžija
- Danilo Stojković - Damnjan
