= The Farm in the Small Marsh (TV series) =

- Салаш у Малом Риту
- Created by: Branko Bauer
- Based on: Salaš u Malom Ritu by Arsen Diklić
- Starring: Slavko Štimac; Miodrag Radovanović; Slobodan Perović; Svetislav Goncić; Miroljub Lešo; Milivoje Tomić; Pavle Vuisić
- Opening theme: "Ja sam rođen tamo na salašu"
- Country of origin: SFR Yugoslavia
- No. of seasons: 1
- No. of episodes: 13

Original release
- Network: TV Belgrade
- Release: 4 February 1976 – 1976

The Farm in the Small Marsh (Serbian: Салаш у Малом Риту / Salaš u Malom Ritu) is a Serbian television series, which was shown in Yugoslavia in 1976. It is based on the eponymous novel by Arsen Diklić, and stars Slavko Štimac in the main role. The show spawned two television films, The Farm in the Small Marsh and Zimovanje u Jakobsfeldu (Serbian for 'Wintering in Jacobsfeld').

== Synopsis ==
Set in 1941, the show follows adventures of Milan Maljević, a teenager from the fictional Banatian village called Mali Rit (Serbian for 'Small Marsh') during World War II in Yugoslavia. Mali Rit is a seemingly peaceful village, whose inhabitants do not resist to German occupation. In fact, the Yugoslav Partisans refrain from attacking the village, used as a secret base, cause they do not want to bring it to German attention. The village's peaceful life is only occasionally disturbed by the commander of a small German barrack within the village.

However, everything in changed once when Partisan saboteurs set fire on wheat destined to be transferred to Germany in a neighboring village. As act of reprisal, members of Deutsche Mannschaft take as hostages several men from that village. The lorry stops in Mali Rit. Vasa, Milan's neighbor and best friend, angered by fact that everybody seemingly is scarred by Germans, gives water to the hostages, after the German commander beats him. In order to get revenge, Vasa decides to set fire to the wheat intended for Germany, hoping that Germans, who guarded the wheat, will share the same fate as the hostages.

Unfortunately to him, Gestapo agent Georg Schitzer arrives in the village. Schitzer soon became suspicious on loyalty of village people, because Mali Rit is the first village in which there was no anti-German activity prior to this fire. Soon he discovers a network of Partisan agents in the village, among them are the owner of local tavern, local barber and Vasa's father. Convinced that he will scratch under the surface, Schitzer decides to take hostages (Paja, the owner of the tavern is shot at 6:00). Fearing for life of her son, Milan's mother decides to go searching for the Partisans to ask them to attack Mali Rit and liberate all hostages. The Partisans liberate all the hostages, and Milan and Petar join them.

In second part of the show, Milan and Petar are with the Partisans, who are preparing for approaching winter. They will seek new shelter on other side of Danube, but this venture is too dangerous for young Milan, who doesn't want to be separated from his brother. So a Partisan commander decides to give Milan a "special" assignment: to go to his mother and spend winter with her, taking with him a newcomer, rebellious teen called Raša. On the trip, Raša became seriously ill, and Milan goes in neighboring Volksdeutscher village called Jacobsfeld. He finds a job as servant of respected land owner Jacob Jerich. During night, Milan goes in hut where he hides Raša, bringing him food. Later he hides Raša in Jerich's stable. Jacob gradually begun to see Milan as his son and plans to adopt him, under condition that Milan give up his non-German origin. In meantime, Šlog, a Partisan agent from the city learns, that runaway Raša is somewhere in Jacobsfeld and believes he is captured by Germans, so he begin to plot how to take Raša out. Unknowing to him, his endeavor might blow Milan's cover.

== Main cast ==
- Slavko Štimac – Milan Maljević
- Miodrag Radovanović – Georg Schitzer
- Slobodan Perović – Jacob Jerich
- Ljubomir Živanović – Vasa
- Milan Kuruzović – Branko
- Svetislav Goncić – Raša
- Miroljub Lešo – Petar Maljević
- Milivoje Tomić – barber
- Pavle Vuisić – owner of local tavern
- Renata Ulmanski – Milan's mother
- Ivan Jagodić – Ivan, Vasa's father
- Miomir Petrović – Saša
- Dragan Mirković – Cile
- Dragoljub Milosavljević – Velja
- Ljubomir Ćipranić – peasant
- Dušan Poček – peasant
- Slobodan Velimirović - German Sergeant
- Vojin Kajganić - Sepp
- Stole Aranđelović - Boatman
- Božidar Pavićević - Šuca
- Gizela Vuković - Milan's aunt
- Danilo Čolić - Boško, partisan commander
- Bata Stojković - Damjan
- Ljubica Ković - Marta Jerich
- Milan Srdoč - Peter
- Goran Sultanović - Hans Leiter, head of local Hitlerjugend
- Mihailo Janketić - Šlog
- Toma Kuruzović - veterinary physician
- Oliver Vujovic - young boy
