= Tasovac =

Tasovac, (Serbian Cyrillic: Тасовац) is a Serbian surname. Notable people with the surname include:

- Ivan Tasovac (1966–2021), Serbian pianist and manager
- Predrag Tasovac (1922–2010), Serbian actor
