= Kutepov =

Kutepov (Russian: Кутепов) is a Russian masculine surname, its feminine counterpart is Kutepova. In the Russian Empire a noble family of Kutepovs that has Turkic roots was inscribed in ancestral book of the Oryol Governorate.

It may refer to

- Alexander Kutepov (1882–1930), Russian Imperial army general
- Ihor Kutepov (born 1965), Ukrainian football player
- Ilya Kutepov (born 1993), Russian football player
- Nikolai Kutepov (1851–1907), Russian writer
- Polina Kutepova (born 1971), Russian actress
