= Three Hours to Love =

- Directed by: Fadil Hadžić
- Written by: Fadil Hadžić
- Starring: Stanislava Pešić; Dragan Nikolić; Tatjana Salaj; Predrag Tasovac; Mladen Crnobrnja
- Cinematography: Frano Vodopivec
- Edited by: Radojka Tanhofer
- Production company: Jadran Film
- Release date: 18 June 1968
- Running time: 88 minutes
- Country: Yugoslavia
- Language: Serbo-Croatian

Three Hours to Love (Serbo-Croatian: Tri sata za ljubav) is a 1968 Yugoslav film directed by Fadil Hadžić.
