= Nikolay Samokish =

Nikolay Semyonovich Samokish
- Николай Семёнович Самокиш; Микола Семенович Самокиш
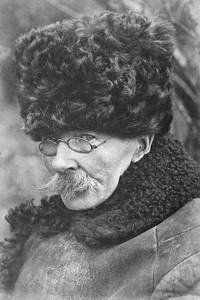
- Born: October 25, 1860; Nezhin, Russian Empire (now Nizhyn, Ukraine)
- Died: January 18, 1944 (aged 83); Simferopol, Russian SFSR
- Education: Member Academy of Arts (1890); Professor by rank (1912); Full Member Academy of Arts (1913)
- Alma mater: Imperial Academy of Arts (1885)
- Notable work: painting
- Awards: Big Gold Medal of the Imperial Academy of Arts (1885)

Nikolay Semyonovich Samokish (Russian: Николай Семёнович Самокиш; Ukrainian: Микола Семенович Самокиш, romanized: Mykola Semenovych Samokysh; 25 October 1860, Nezhin, Government of Chernigov, Russian Empire – 18 January 1944, Simferopol, Russian SFSR, USSR) was a Ukrainian and Soviet painter and illustrator of Ukrainian Cossack descent who specialized in military art and animal painting. During the First World War Samokish was a correspondent for The Russian Sun, one of the most popular patriotic journals in Imperial Russia. He was a recipient of the Stalin Prize in 1941.

Samokish is also known as the second husband of the book illustrator Elena Sudkovskaya, with whom he often collaborated.

== Biography ==
His father was a postman; probably of Hungarian ancestry. He spent his youth in Nosivka with the family of his maternal grandfather, who was a Cossack. Later, he graduated from Nezhin Lyceum of Prince Bezborodko. His first attempt to enroll at the St. Petersburg Academy of arts was unsuccessful, but he gained an endorsement from an associate of Professor Bogdan Willewalde, was admitted, and studied there from 1879 to 1885 with Mikhail Clodt and Valery Jacobi as well as Willewalde, and won several awards. His painting "Прогулка" (the Walk) was bought by Pavel Tretyakov.

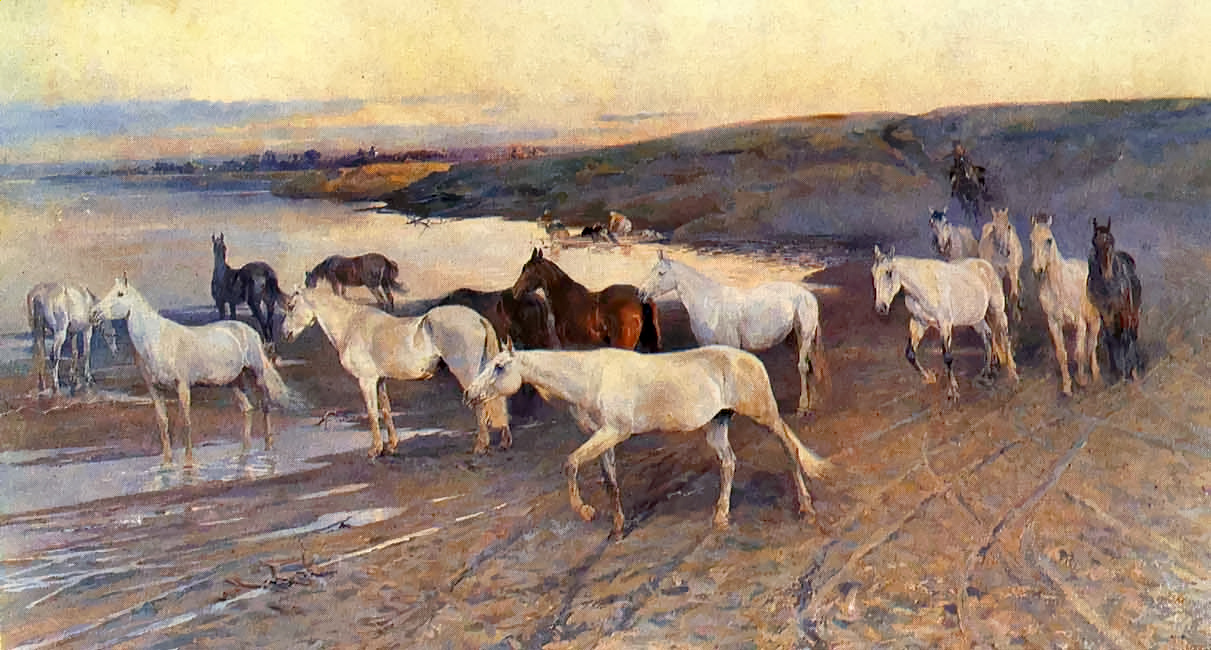
Herd of Mares at the Watering Hole, the painting that earned him the rank of academician

From 1885 to 1888, he studied in Paris with Édouard Detaille. When he returned, he and Franz Roubaud travelled to the Caucasus to create some large works for a panorama at the military history museum of Tbilisi. In 1889, he married the well-known book illustrator, Elena Sudkovskaya. The following year, he was named an Academician. From 1894 to 1918, he taught at the Academy, where he became a Professor in 1913.

In 1904, on behalf of the magazine Niva, he travelled to the front during the Russo-Japanese War and produced an album of paintings. In 1915, he and some of his students at the Academy formed an "Art Squad" and went to the Eastern Front to make sketches. During the Russian Revolution, he became separated from his wife. She went to Paris and apparently died there in 1924, although some sources say she returned to Russia and died in Vyborg.

In 1918, after the old Academy was abolished, he moved to Yalta with the Armed Forces of South Russia then, in 1922, to Simferopol, where he provided support to artistically talented youngsters and eventually organized an art school that received official state recognition. In 1934, he was given what would prove to be his largest commission: acting as managing consultant for a gigantic panorama depicting the Siege of Perekop. After 1936, he worked at the art institute in Kharkiv.

Among the thousands of book illustrations he produced, perhaps the most notable are those for stories by Marko Vovchok, Mykola Dzherya by Ivan Nechuy-Levytsky, Taras Bulba by Nikolai Gogol and Imperial Hunting in Russia by Nikolai Kutepov. He and his wife worked together to illustrate Dead Souls and create murals for the Tsarskoye Selo railway station.

Shortly after the end of World War II, a major exhibition of his early works was held at his workshop in Kharkiv. He was the subject of a documentary film in 1966.

== Selected paintings ==
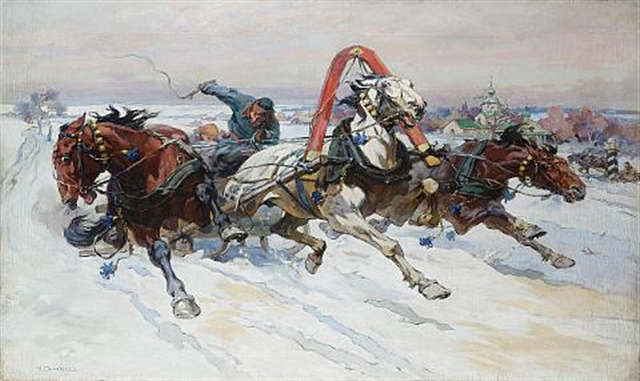
Speeding Troika

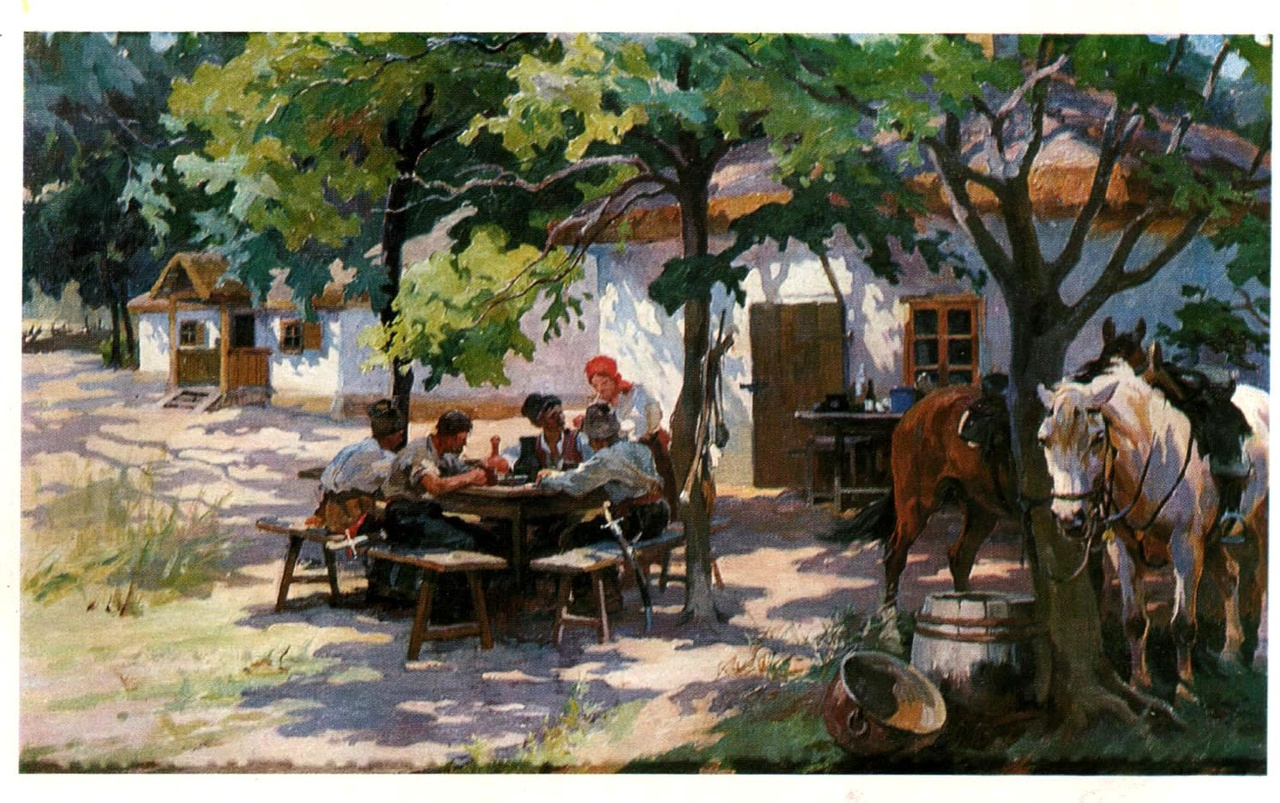
Cossacks at a Tavern

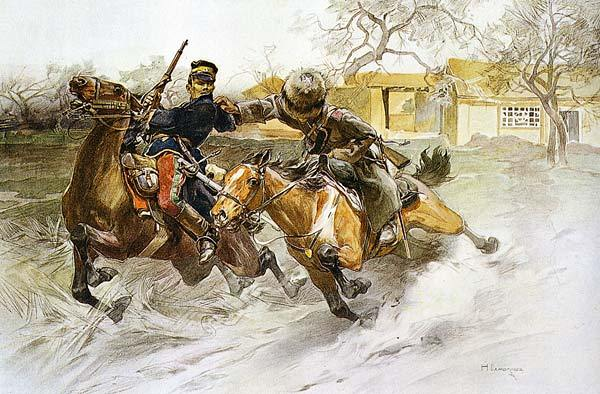
Pursuit

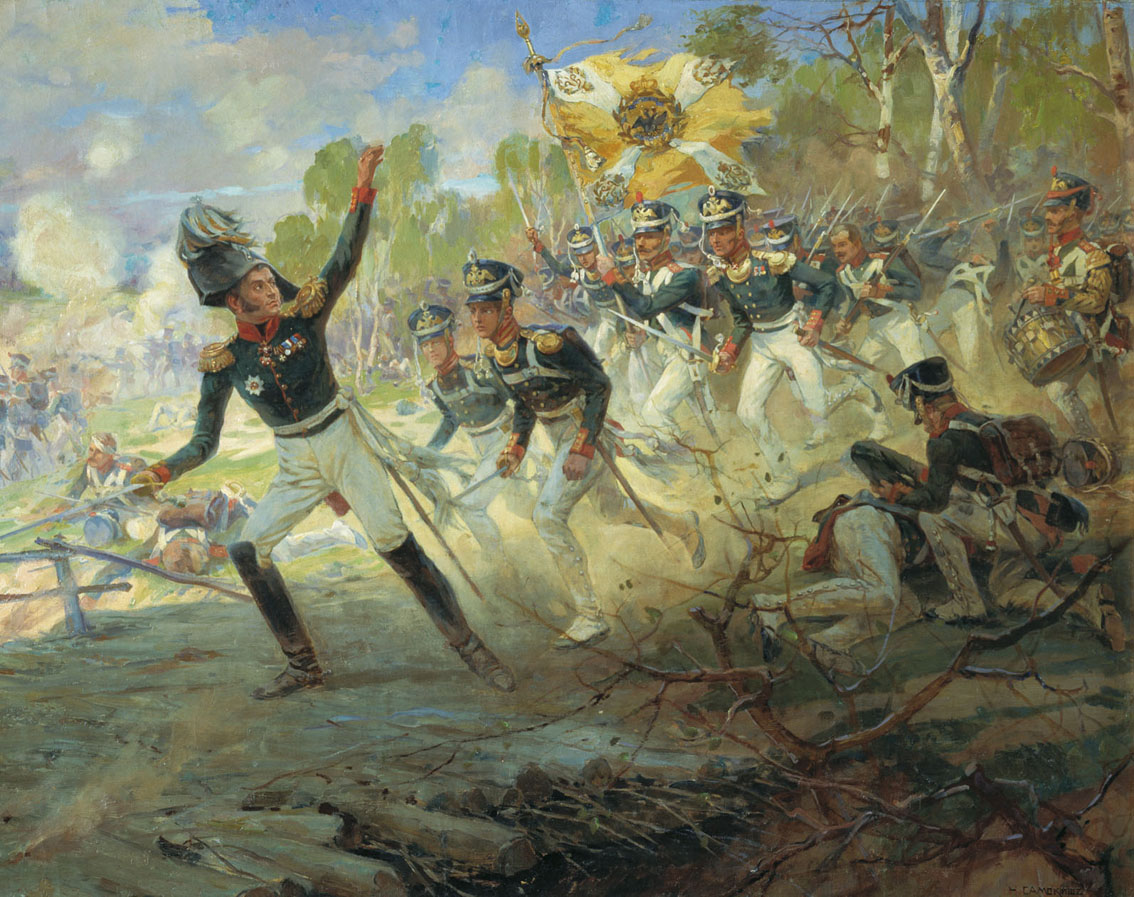
The Courage of General Raevsky

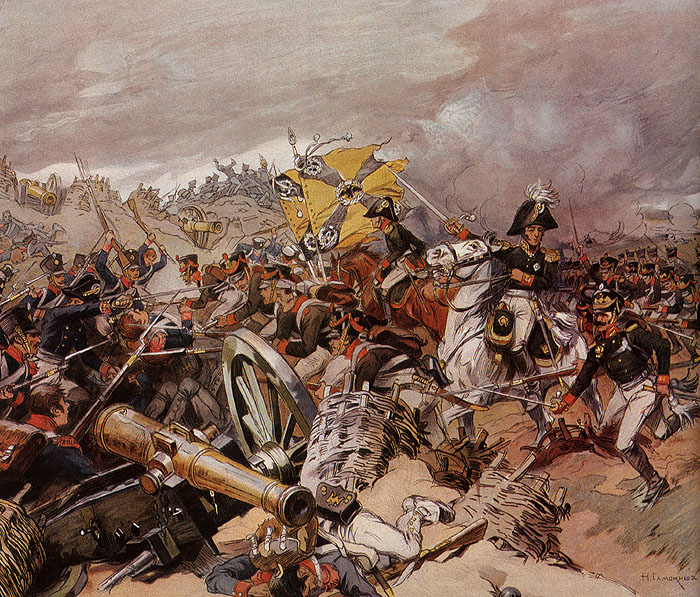
The Attack of the Shevardino Redoubt
