= Rufin Sudkovsky =

Russian painter

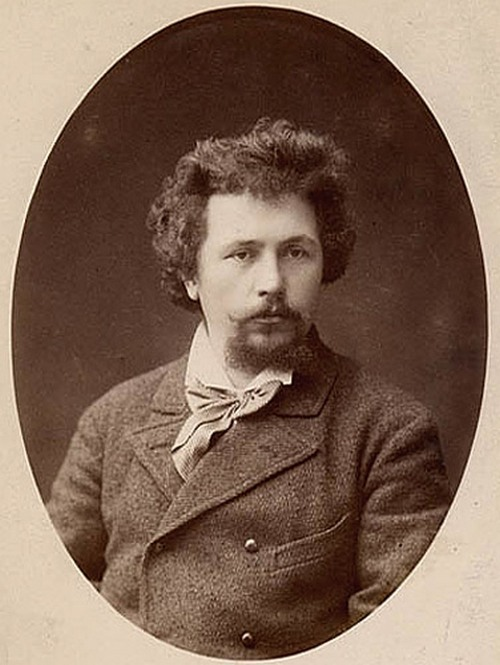
- Photograph from 1885
- Born: April 7, 1850; Ochakov
- Died: February 4, 1885 (aged 34); Ochakov
- Education: Member Academy of Arts (1881)
- Alma mater: Imperial Academy of Arts
- Known for: Painting
- Style: Romanticism, Academism
- Spouse: Elena Benard (m. 1883)

Rufin Gavrilovich Sudkovsky (Russian: Руфин Гаврилович Судковский; 19 April 1850, Ochakov, Government of Kherson, Russian Empire – 16 February 1885, Ochakov) was a Russian Imperial landscape painter who specialized in naval and maritime scenes. Rufin Sudkovsky was also well known as the first husband of the popular illustrator Elena Samokysh-Sudkovskaya.

== Biography ==
He was the son of a Russian Orthodox priest in the Diocese of Kherson, then part of the Russian Empire, now Ukraine. Originally, he planned to follow in his father's footsteps, studying first at the local religious school, then at the Odessa Theological Seminary, but he soon lost interest. He had been attracted to drawing since he was a child, and began to frequent the Odessa Drawing School at the local art society. Under the influence of Odessa's status as a major port, his focus soon turned to maritime themes.

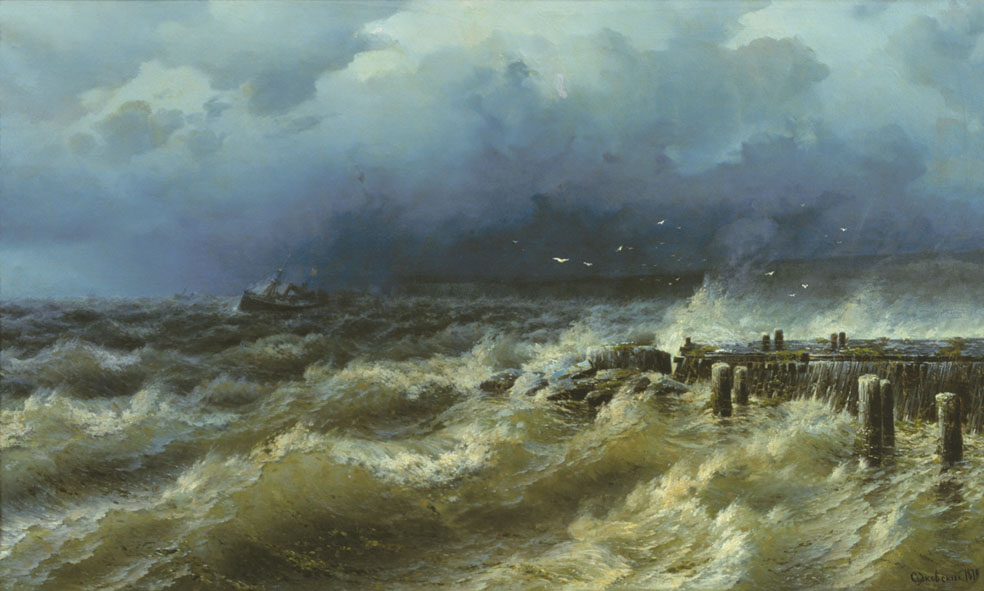
Surf at the Pier (1879)

In 1868, he left the seminary and went to Saint Petersburg, where he was accepted on a provisional basis at the Imperial Academy of Arts. He eventually became a full student, remaining for three years and being awarded several medals. He returned to Ochakiv in 1871 and began a series of sketches of the Black Sea coastline. Most of these early works were derivative, and were not successful when they were exhibited in Saint Petersburg. His technique and originality improved during a trip to Germany and France in 1874. Three years later, a new exhibit at the Academy earned him the title of "Free Artist" (second degree). In 1879, he was promoted to first degree.

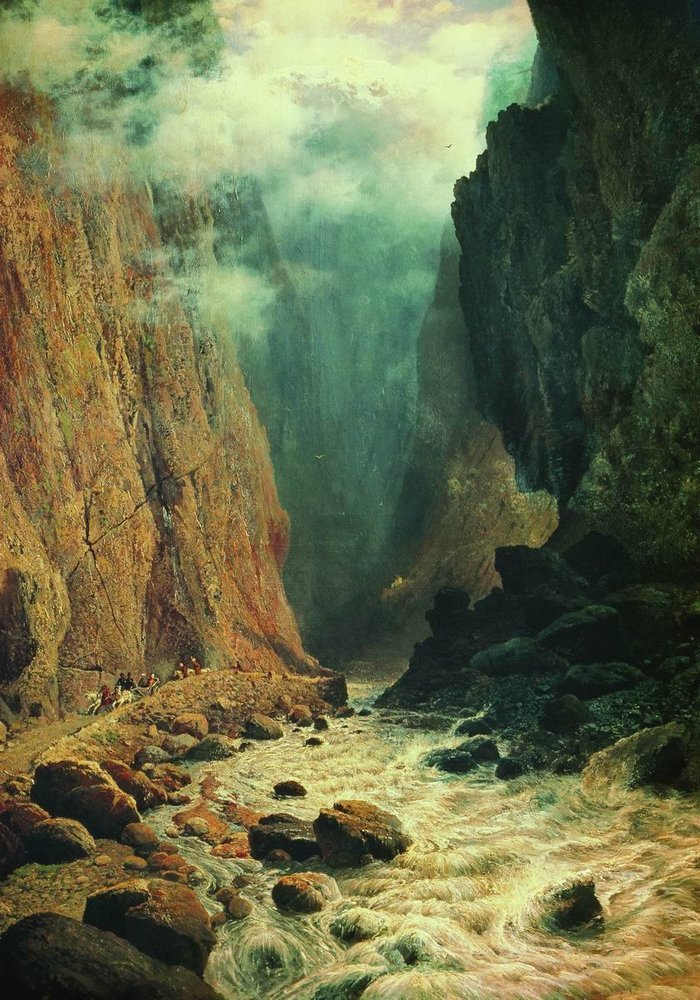
Darial Gorge (1884)

=== Plagiarism allegations ===
He continued to exhibit in Saint Petersburg, sometimes together with Julius Sergius von Klever. In 1882, his painting, "Tempest near Ochakov", won him the title of Academician. The following year, he was married and became embroiled in a controversy when Arkhip Kuindzhi (a former roommate at the Academy) accused him of plagiarism. Although the critics and press took his side, several artists (Kramskoi, Maximov, Volkov and Repin) published a letter in the New Times, stating that Sudovsky had "directly borrowed" from Kuindzhi.

Two years later, at the height of his career, he fell ill with typhus during an exhibition in Kiev, and was taken back to Ochakiv, where he died. Despite his short life, he was able to complete a large number of canvases, which were presented by his friends in a retrospective, shortly after his death. His widow, Elena (also an artist), married the military painter, Nikolay Samokish in 1889 and became a popular illustrator.
