= Miodrag Radovanović =

Serbian actor (1929–2019)

- Миодраг Радовановић
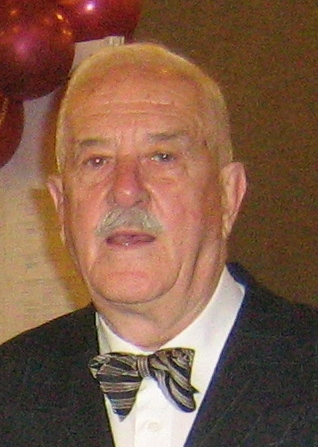
- Radovanović in 2008
- Born: 20 August 1929; Čačak, Kingdom of Yugoslavia
- Died: 15 January 2019 (aged 89); Belgrade, Serbia
- Occupation: Actor
- Years active: 1957–2019

Miodrag Radovanović (Serbian Cyrillic: Миодраг Радовановић: 20 August 1929 – 15 January 2019) was a Serbian actor. He appeared in more than one hundred films since 1957. He won the Golden Arena Award for Best Supporting Actor for his role in Salaš u Malom Ritu.

== Selected filmography ==
Film
| Year | Title | Role | Notes |
|---|---|---|---|
| 1976 | The Farm in the Small Marsh | Šicer | Golden Arena for Best Supporting Actor |
| 1984 | The Elusive Summer of '68 | | |
| 1989 | Battle of Kosovo | | |
| 2000 | Shadows of Memories | | |

Television
| Year | Title | Role | Notes |
|---|---|---|---|
| 1975–1976 | The Farm in the Small Marsh | | |
| 1987 | Vuk Karadžić | | |
| 1995 | The End of Obrenović Dynasty | | |
| 2007–2008 | Vratiće se rode | | |
