= Staro Selo, Lika-Senj County =

Staro Selo
- Village
- Location within Croatia
- Coordinates: 44°52′N 15°14′E
- Country: Croatia
- County: Lika-Senj
- Municipality: Otočac

Area
  - Total: 3.2 sq mi (8.2 km^{2})

Population (2021)
  - Total: 28
  - Density: 8.8/sq mi (3.4/km^{2})
- Time zone: UTC+1 (CET)
  - Summer (DST): UTC+2 (CEST)
- Postal code: 53220
- Area code: (+385) 053

Staro Selo is a village near Otočac, Croatia.

== Demographics ==
According to the census in 2001, the village had a population of 17 and 6 family households.

== History ==
Staro Selo was founded around 1658 by Uzelac and 12 other families.

== People ==
- Arsen Diklić - writer
