= Salaš =

Traditional type of farm in the Pannonian Plain region

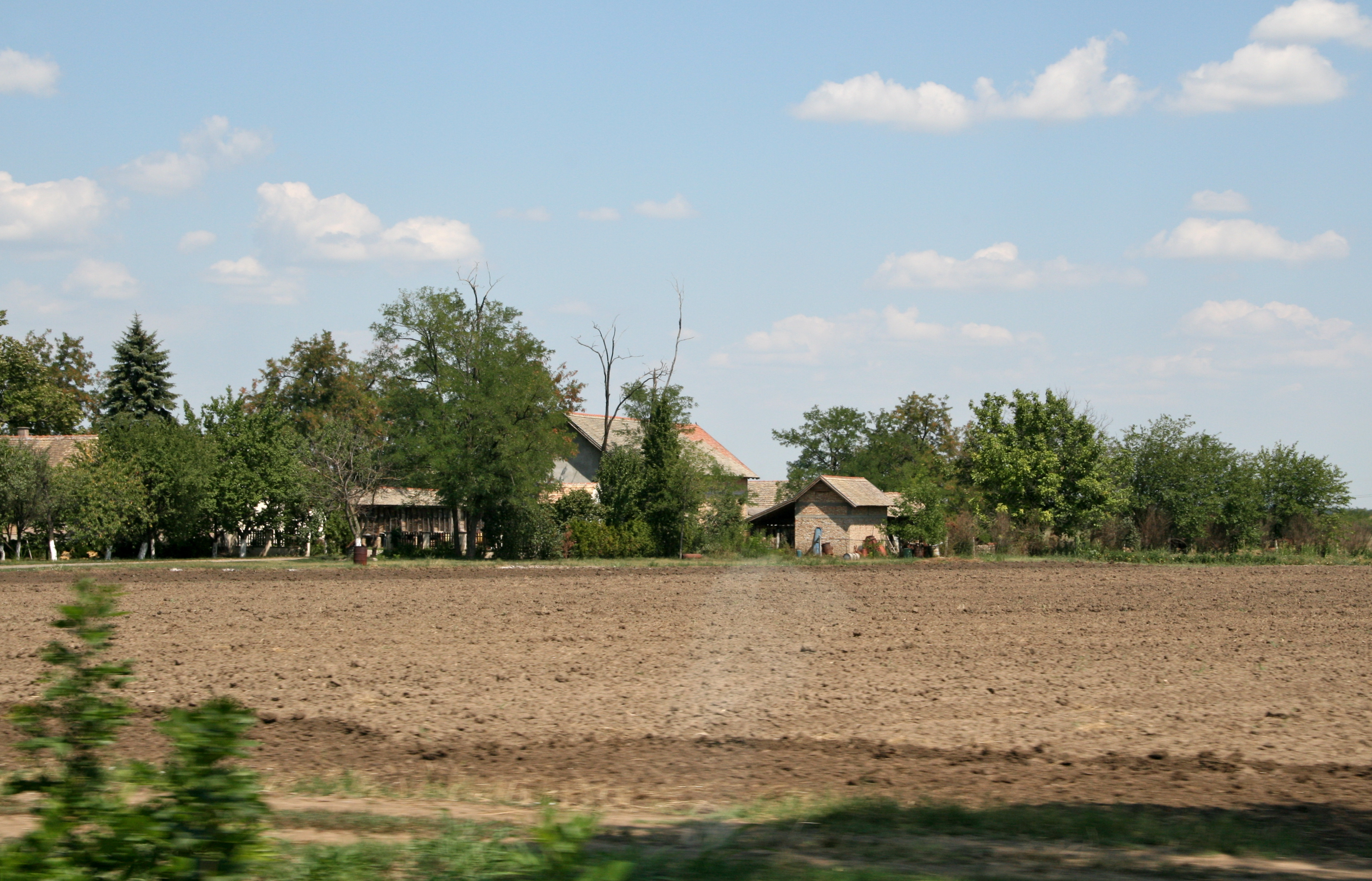
Salaš property in Čenej, Vojvodina, Serbia

Salaš (in Serbo-Croatian, Czech, Slovak and Rusyn from Hungarian szállás meaning "house, accommodation") is a traditional type of property in the Pannonian Plain region, particularly in Bačka and Slavonia, with a family house and agricultural objects such as a barn, stable and granary, surrounded by arable land and pastures. They were owned and inhabited by a single family, who lived there for generations. Western equivalents to the salaš are ranches and cottages.

Since the Middle Ages, Salaš properties have been present across the Pannonian lowlands, from Slovakia and Austria to Romania and Serbia (especially in the northern parts such as Vojvodina).

In modern times, these types of dwelling have become less frequent, with many dying out along with the specific culture surrounding these properties.

== History ==
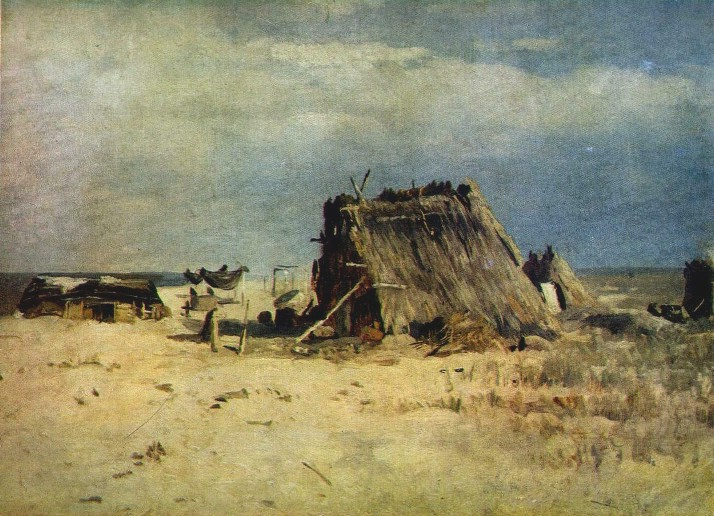
Painting of a Temporary dwelling for peasants, btw. 1868 and 1885, Rufin Sudkovsky

Salaš, as unique type of building heritage, was created and developed under certain natural and economic conditions. Since the Middle Ages and until the middle of the 19th century, they were makeshift dwellings used by cattlemen. Later, by switching to agriculture, the salaš shifted their use into family homes, similar to those built in villages.

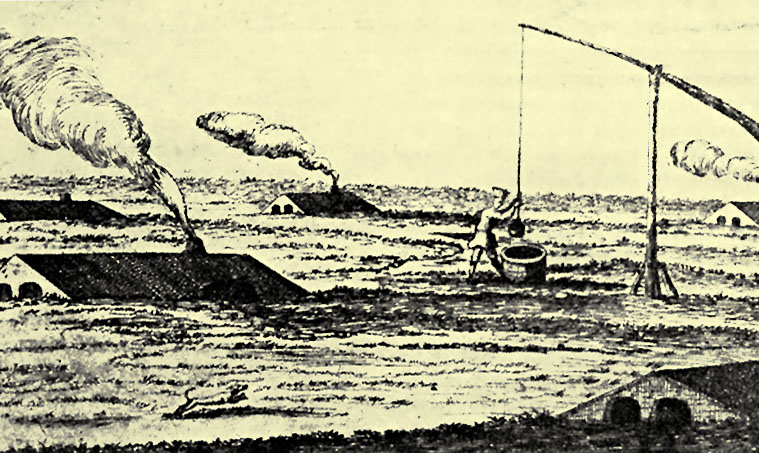
Dugout salaš in Srem, Vojvodina, Serbia (then Kingdom of Hungary), 17th century

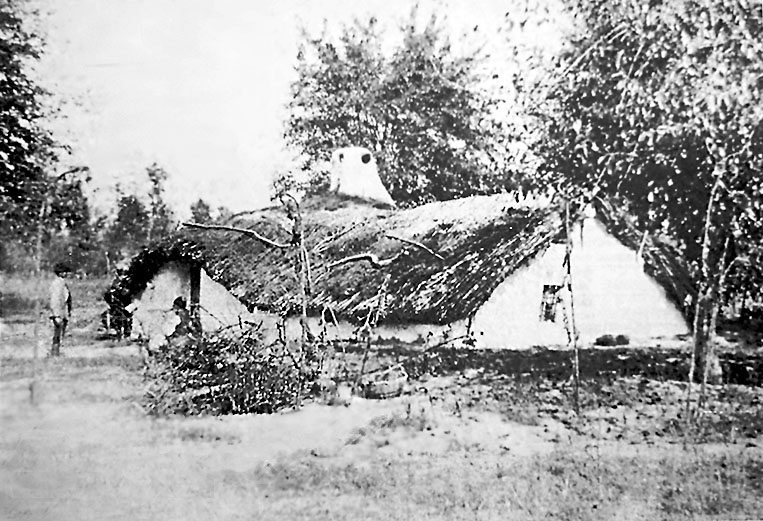
Dugout salaš in Subotica, Vojvodina, Serbia (then Austria-Hungary), 1909

Initially, salaš were summer dwellings for peasants, while over time, some became permanent dwellings. In the late stage of the development of these properties, two types salaš were distinguished: The farm-type salaš, where the owner or the tenant lived permanently; The salaš of more affluent peasants, where they had a village house, but would only arrive at the salaš for work during agricultural seasons. With the arrival of the railway, the salaš entered an organized system of development of their spatial plan. The salaš railway stations connected salaš agglomerations with the nearest settlements. With the loss of the function of transporting goods and passenger from salaš properties to towns, these railways become unprofitable and gradually were dismantled, thereby causing further fragmentation and disconnect of salaš properties with other settlements.

However, farmers themselves have become increasingly mobile over time, especially since the introduction of the tractor into farm use, thus eliminating the need to deal with summer habitats in the fields. This was one of the reasons for the mass abandonment and dismantlement of salaš properties.

Agrarian reforms aimed at collectivization and arrondissement of land, as well as the emergence of large-scale labour cooperatives and increased production, have marginalized the role of the small-scale salaš. All of these changes have resulted in the degradation of the salaš, as well as the fields surrounding them. Agricultural enterprises grouped large cattle stock in smaller areas, as opposed to the extensive grazing land previously used, which were considered unproductive. This resulted in the disappearance of many green pastures.

The disappearance of many salaš properties impoverished the already empty regions of Vojvodina. The salaš properties functioned as green-white island, the habitats of countless bird species and hiding places for large game. The salaš were also the sources of culture and all kinds of traditional goods: The source of the Vojvodina mentality; The source of hard-working, thrifty, persistent, withdrawn, silent, and measured people with special subtle and ambiguous humor; The source of cattle, poultry, grapes, mulberries, rakia, gomboca, gibanica.

== Traditional Vojvodina salaš ==
Salaš, as a basic element of the area, has dominated the Vojvodina plain since the Middle Ages, well before the arrival of the Turks in the area. For the longest of time this was the only way of living for the few scattered inhabitants across the large flat area of the plain.

=== Building types and construction ===
There are and were several types of salaš buildings. From primitive earth lodges, half-dugouts, mudhuts, to buildings with complex construction design, with two or tree rooms, with larger or smaller foundation, etc. Salaš houses were built of natural locally found materials: the walls were raised from beaten mud, or mud-and-hay bricks dried in the sun. The roof was usually from dried reed, assembled together in traditional craftsmanship.

Each of the local people and nationalities added something original to their concept of the salaš, like the different appearance of the dwelling. However, each salaš retained the same practical concept of housing landowning in the plains. The ethno-house in Bačka Topola built in 1843, belonging to a Hungarian family, is a typical example of an owners house for any part of Vojvodina – the overpowering Slovak blue in it even gives the impression of a combination of cultures: By living side by side, the national differences of Vojvodina were made less distinct, blending of different cultural elements, with the emphasis on small cultural nuances and functionality.

Salaš house positions varied from front facing ones like in Vojvodina villages, or those at the back or at the sides of the owners land. According to traditional salaš plans, it is implied that they have two rooms, a centrally located kitchen and entrance hall. In the central area of each salaš is an oven, often with an open chimney, and the house is often fitted with a barn. This was done for practical reasons for less burning costs for the owner. The entrance to the house is from the courtyard, over a half-open porch, which has columns or a fence with half arches. The room next to the street is the front room where everyday use, while the back room is the guest room or the "clean room", where the better furniture is often placed. Some salaš houses would also have summer kitchens, which were used exclusively during warmer season. The stoves were furnaces, where bread was baked, with a cottage being obligatory for the grub, hen and dove houses, barn and other cattle and agricultural constructions.

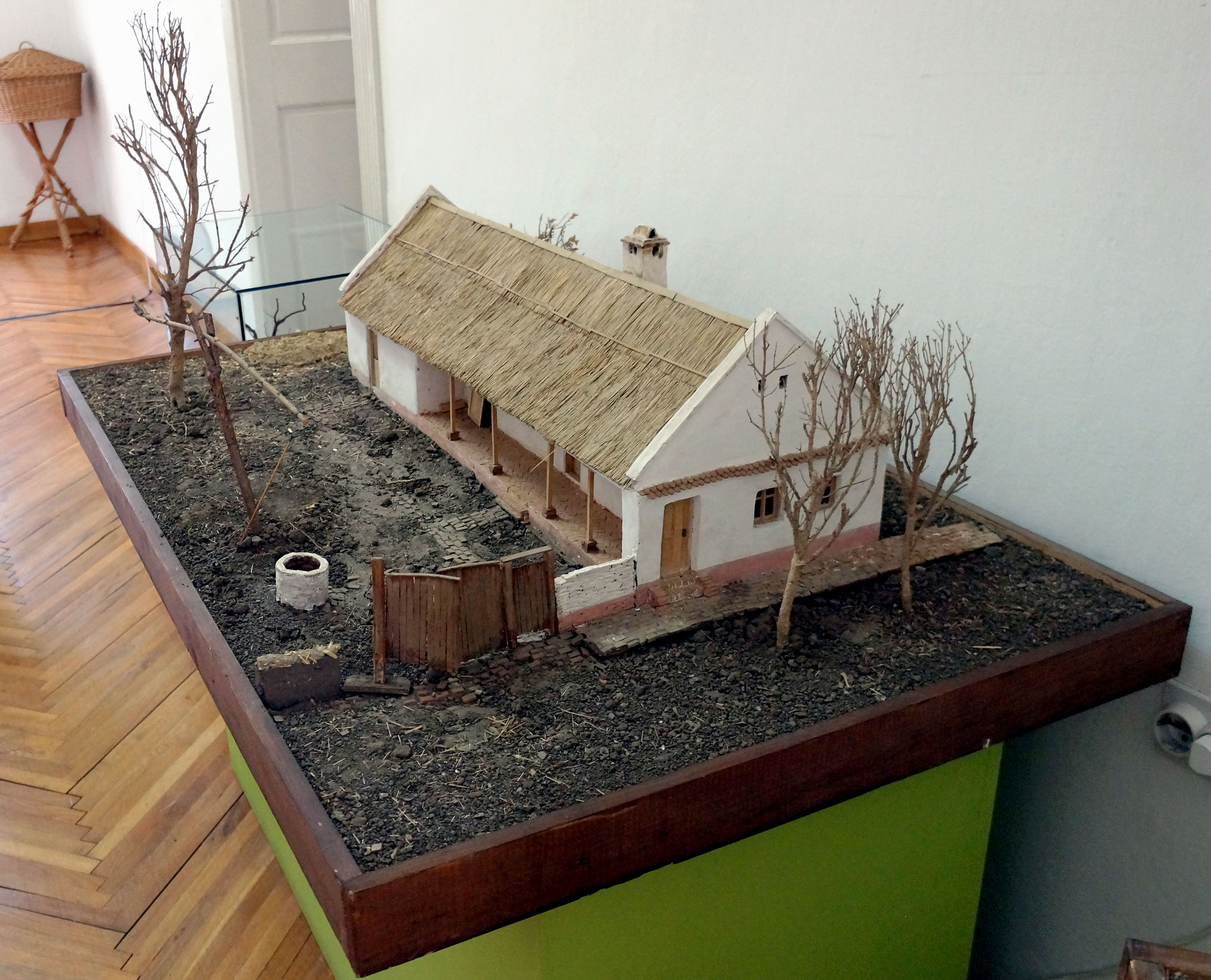
Model of a salaš with elevated foundation in the Kikinda Museum, Vojvodina, Serbia

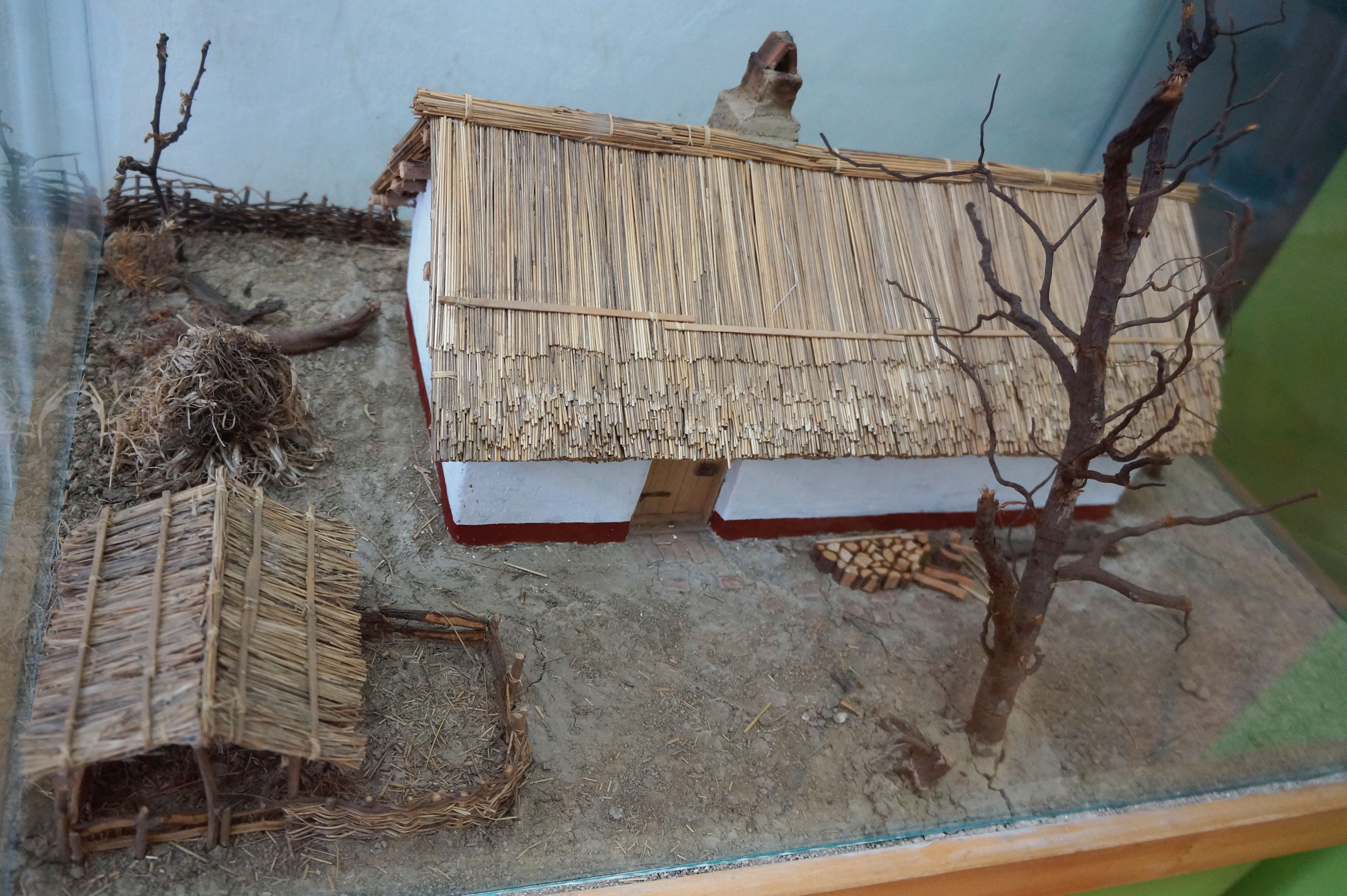
Model of a salaš with no elevated foundation in the Kikinda Museum, Vojvodina, Serbia

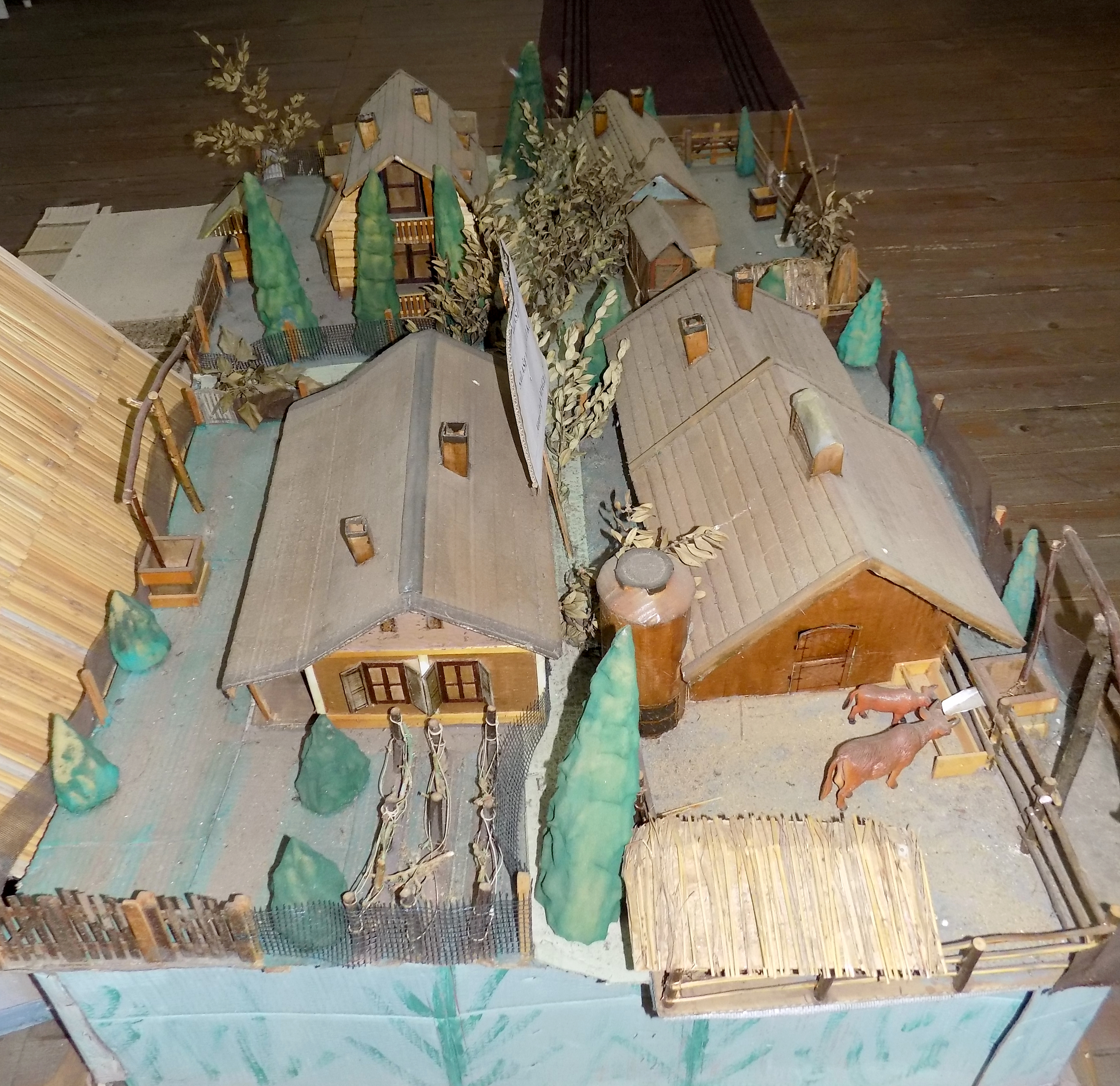
Model of Vojvodina salaš, Agricultural Museum, Kuplin, Vojvodina, Serbia

== Fate and future of salaš ==
In modern times, salaš properties are a reminder of older simpler times and the sounds of tamburica music. The few remaining salaš dwellings have been repurposed into modern restaurants or museums for tourists, with specific cottage and rustic charm. They promote traditional foods and beverages, customs, farm life, folklore, music, etc. Some of the more famous salaš properties are Salaš 84 at Novi Sad, Salaš Katai at Mali Iđoš, Rokin Salaš in Hajdukovi, Sunčani and Cvetni Salaš at Subotica. Salaš properties are a constant presence for ethnographic and other editions and have been explained in detail in many monographs.

In Slovak culture, salaše were remote encampments for shepherds, and eventually came to denote small countryside restaurants established in such houses, providing sheep products and traditional home meals such as bryndzové halušky.

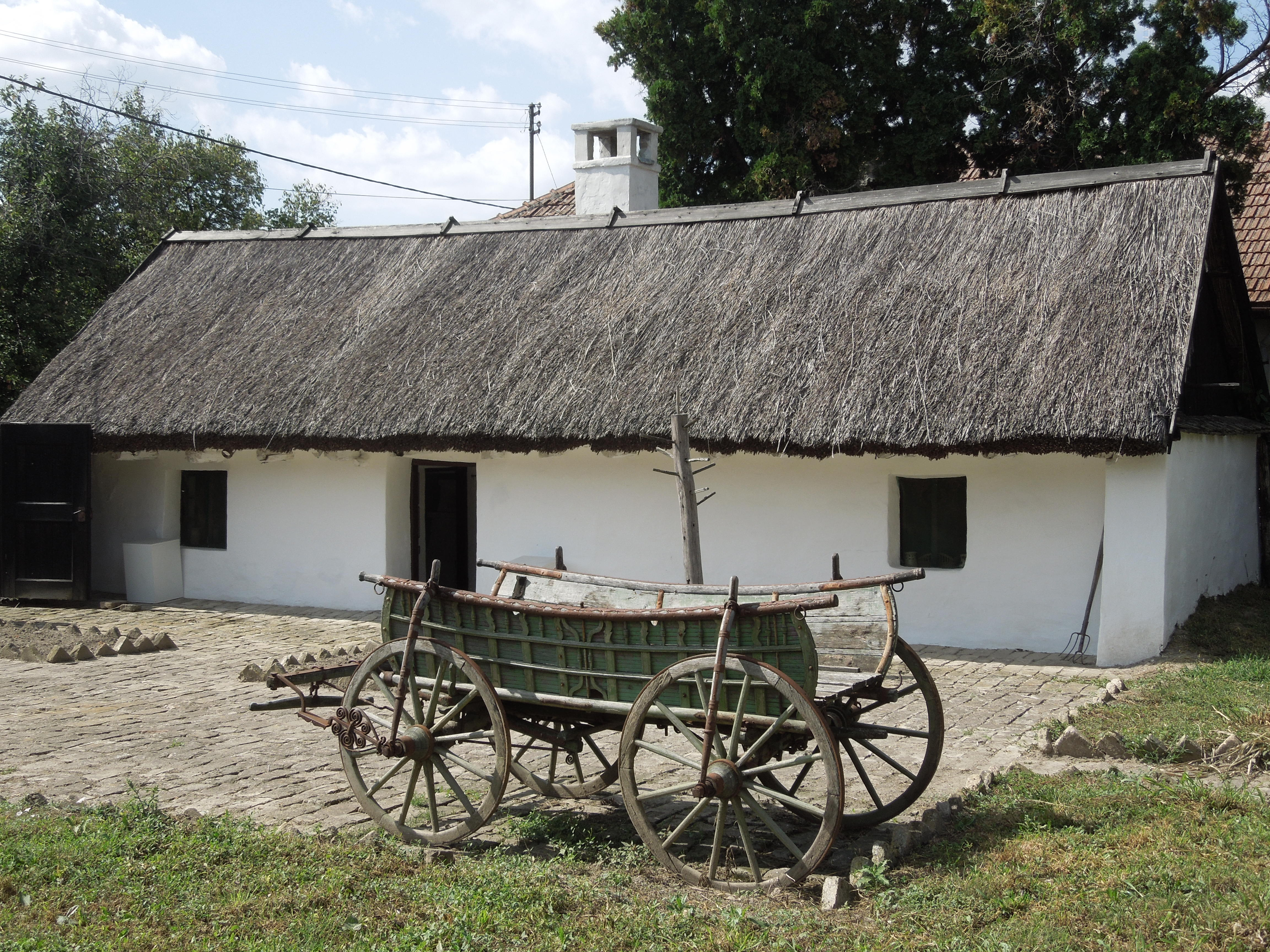
Restored and protected salaš in Bački Petrovac, Vojvodina, Serbia, 1799

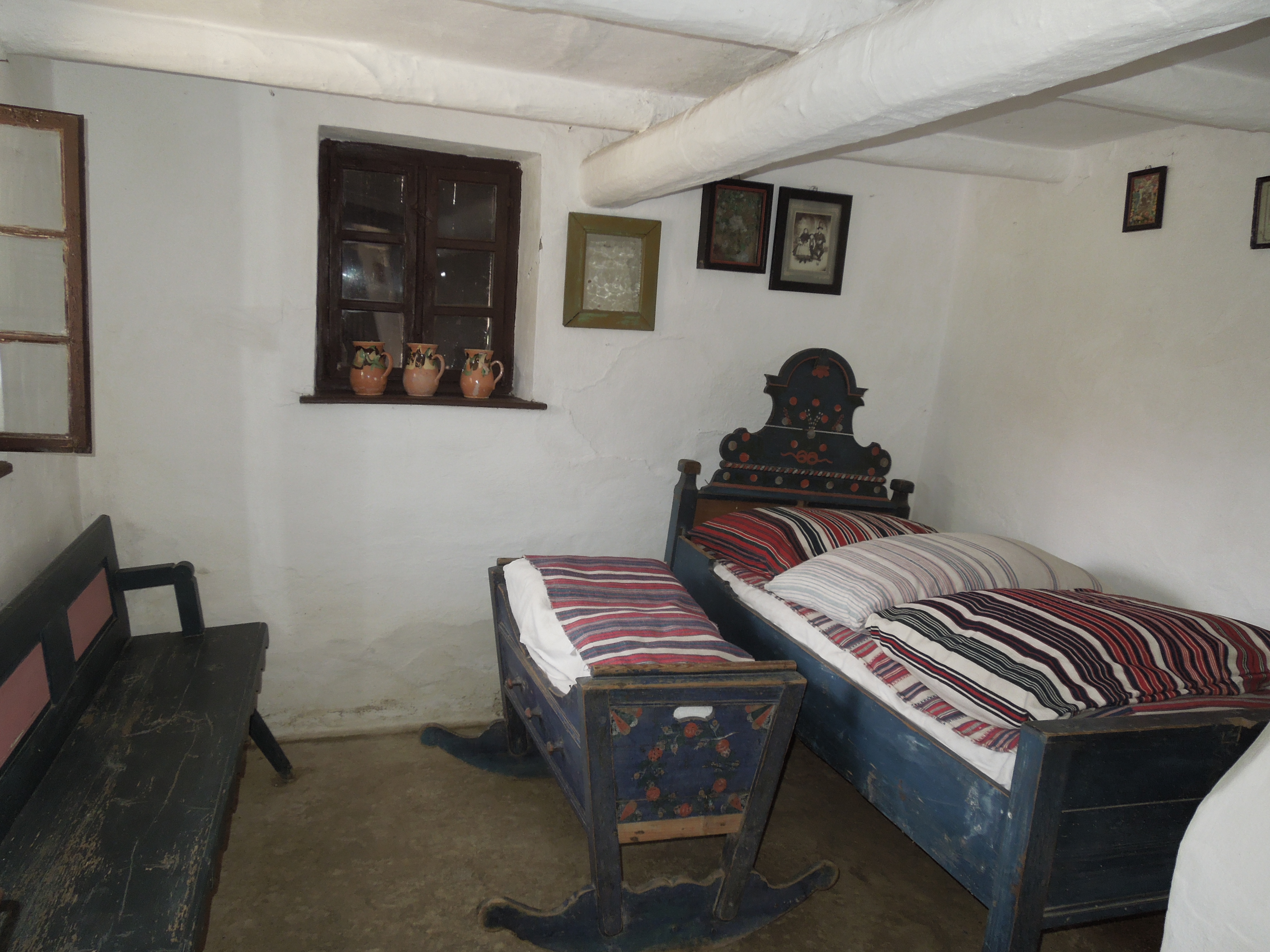
Salaš interior in Bački Petrovac

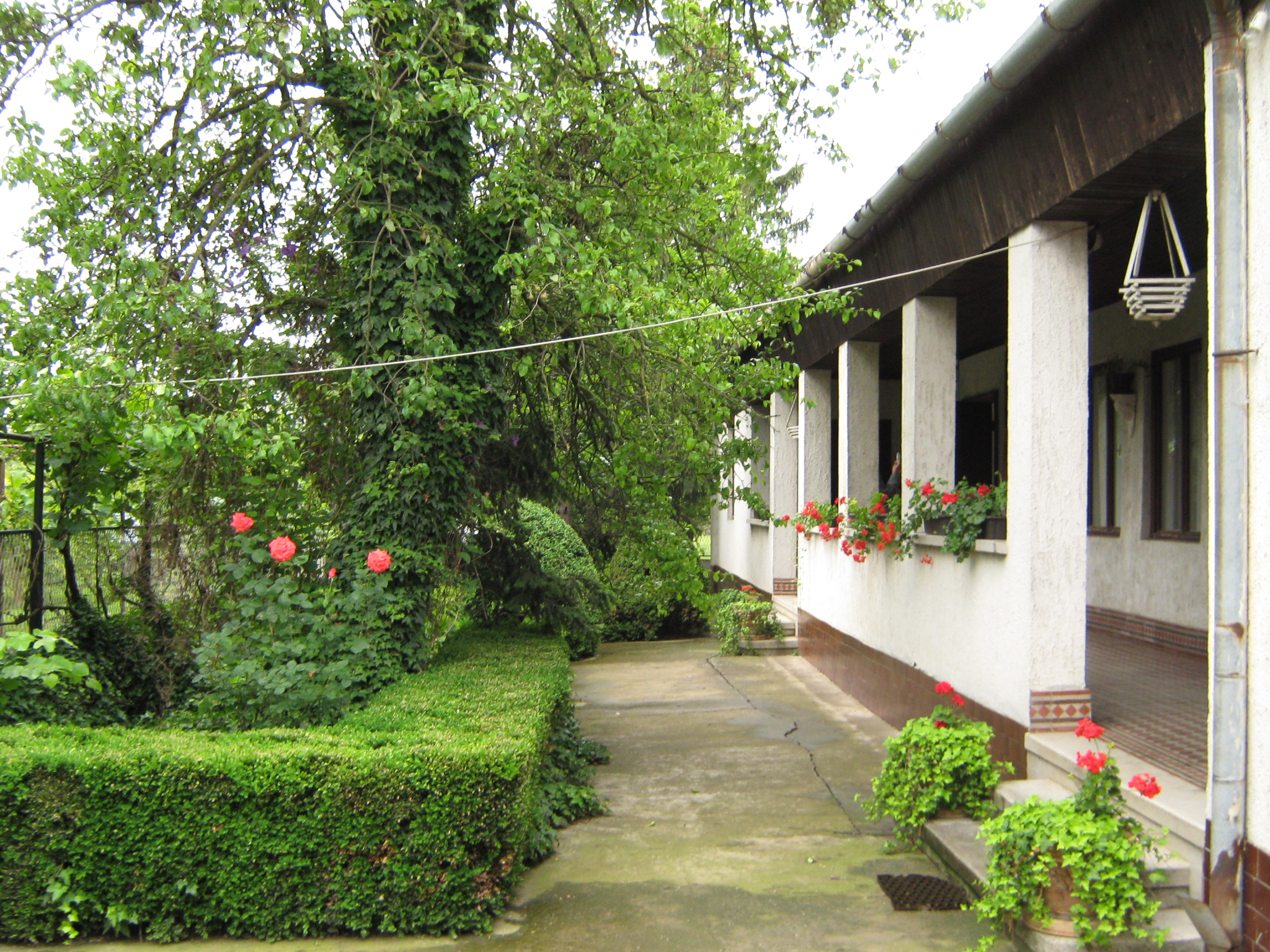
Dida Hornjakov salaš near Sombor, Vojvodina, Serbia 1901

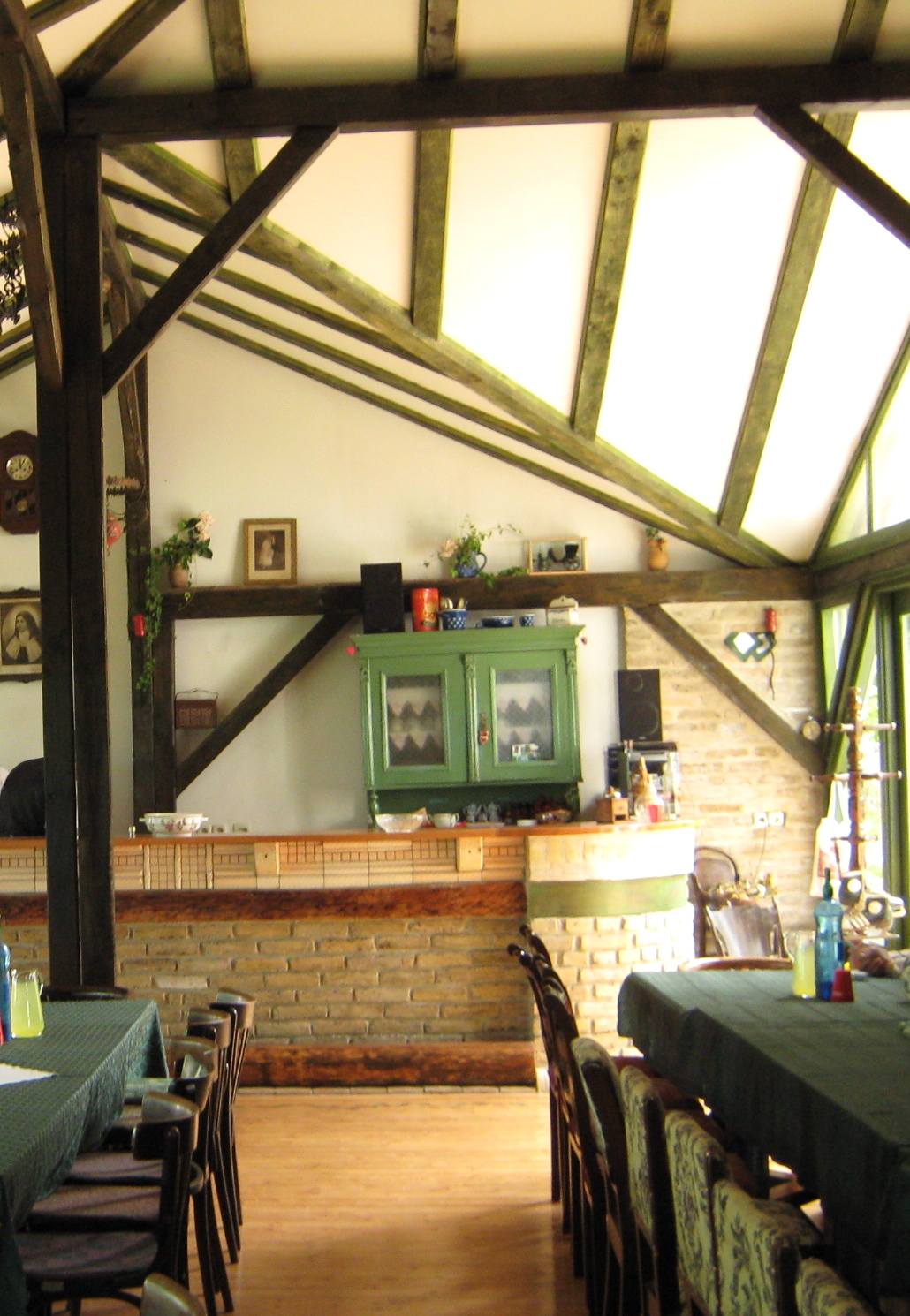
Interior of Dida Hornjakov salaš

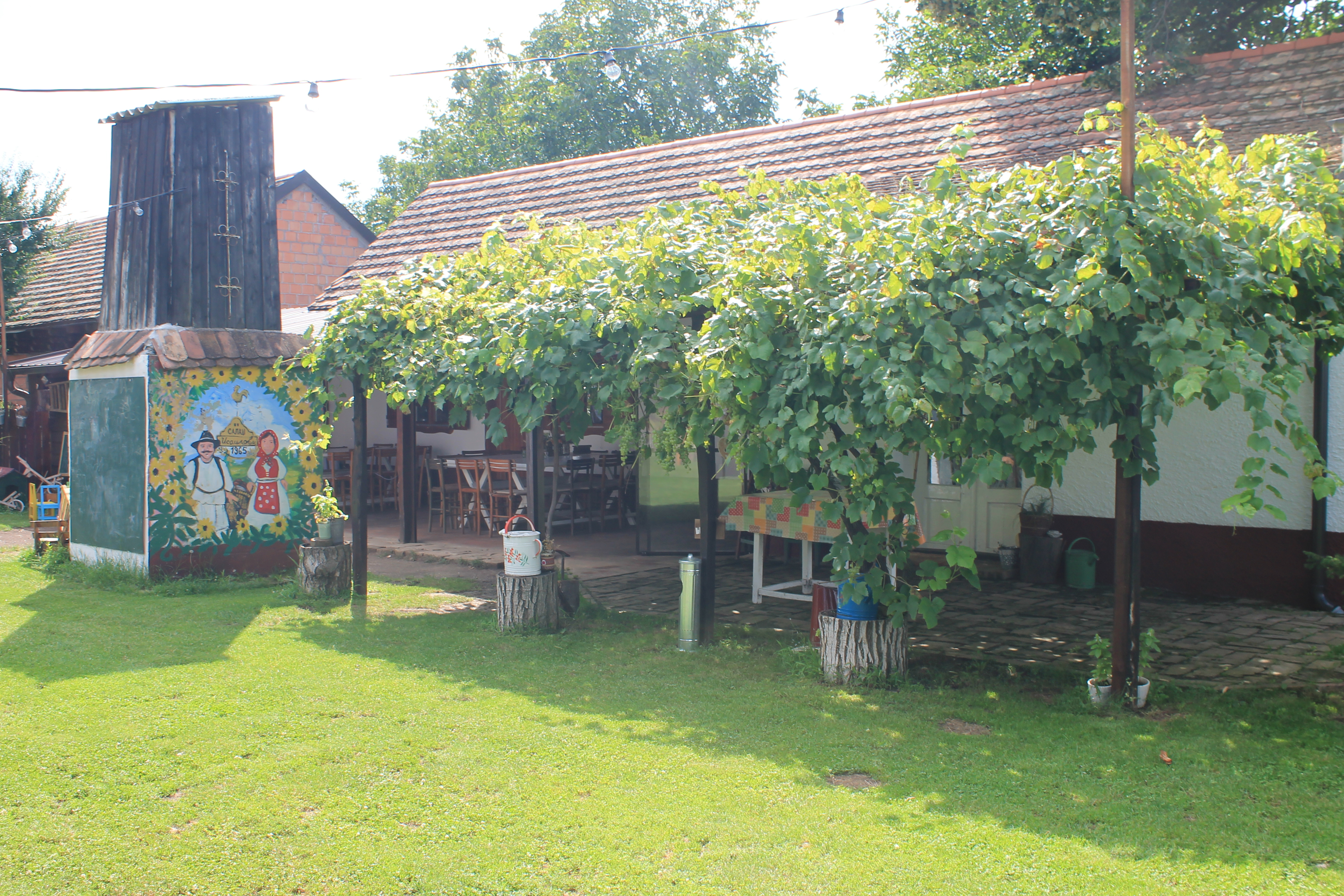
Isailovi salaš between Ruma and Sremska Mitrovica, Vojvodina, Serbia, 1965

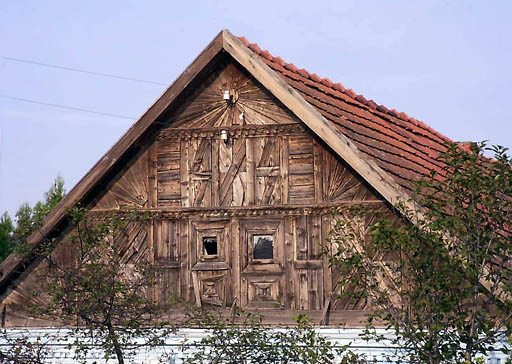
Special "sun-decorated" salaš in Čantavir, Vojvodina, Serbia

== See also ==
- "Ja sam rođen tamo na salašu" ('I was born there on a farm'), Serbian patriotic song from Vojvodina

== Literature ==
- Lazić, Veselin; Grujić, Milorad (1994). Ej, salaši. PČESA. ISBN 978-86-82509-01-1. (in Serbian)
- Harkai Imre (1992): Graditeljstvo Bačke Topole. Rubicon - Temerin. (in Serbian)
- Harkai Imre (1998): Salašarski sistem Bačke Topole – Topolya mezőváros tanyarendszere. Cnesa, Kanjiža (in Hungarian and Serbian)
- Bela Duranci (1984): Salaši Oroma – Oromi szállások (in Hungarian and Serbian)
- Bela Duranci (1984): Agrártörténeti emlékeinkről (Spomenici iz istorijata našeg agrara). In: "Híd", Novi Sad. (in Hungarian)
- Branislav Kojić (1973): Сеоска архитектура и руризам, Belgrade. (in Serbian)
- Ferenc Erdei (1974): Magyar tanyák (Salaši u Mađarskoj), Budapest. (in Hungarian)
- Győrffy István (1983): Alföldi népélet, Budapest. (in Hungarian)
- Ljubinko Pušić (1987): Урбанистички развој градова у Војводини у XIX и првој половини XX века, Novi Sad. (in Serbian)
- Tripolsky Géza (1985): A Tisza-vidék tanyái (Potiski salaši). In: "Üzenet" br. 9 (in Hungarian)
- Slavko Golić (2007): Seoski turizam - 'ej, salaši, Studio Bečkerek (in Serbian)
