= Some Birds Can't Fly =

- Directed by: Petar Lalović
- Starring: Bata Živojinović; Ivana Surdic
- Release date: 12 July 1997
- Running time: 90 min
- Country: Yugoslavia
- Language: Serbian

Some Birds Can't Fly (Serbian: Птице које не полете / Ptice koje ne polete) is a 1997 Yugoslav drama film directed by Petar Lalović.

== Plot ==
Belgrade's hot weather, overcrowding and noisiness makes Vesna sick. Her parents are divorced, but still remain friendly to one another. They take her to see a doctor and she gets diagnosed with leukemia. They try to help her but nothing works. Vesna's grandpa lives in the forest, far away from the city. Her mother, who hasn't spoken to him for over 20 years, decides to ask him for help. He arrives to the hospital by his horse and suggests that Vesna comes to live with him for some time, saying that nature would make her feel better. Her family eventually agrees, and so Vesna goes to live with her grandpa for two months. He lives in a wooden house, with no television and electricity. He has a lot of animals, which Vesna mets the next morning. She tries to run away, but her grandpa catches her, has a talk with her and succeeds in making her more comfortable.

One day, Vesna's grandfather gets caught in a bear trap. He can't do anything for days, and has to lay in bed, so Vesna has to learn to take care of them both. Her grandpa gets better again and they continue doing something new every day. In the end her family comes to pick her up. Her mother is delighted that her daughter feels better and beat leukemia. Vesna goes home and had to learn everything she missed from school. She passes her geography oral exam and was only left with Serbian and music exam. While she plays a musical instrument, she faints and the teacher runs out calling for help. They take her to the hospital and she becomes sad again. Her grandpa comes and takes her. She immediately becomes happy and jumps in his arms. The nurse tries to stop him but he won't let Vesna go. Him and his friend drive her to grandpa's house and she becomes happy and healthy again. Her grandpa ends up getting shot by someone. They bury him in the forest, while his dog sits there whining. Vesna kisses his cross and whispers something, then leaves her tetris on the ground. On their way home, she sees a stork named Đura, she says that his family went south, but that he can't because he hurt his wing, that he'll die. Her mother says that he won't, that maybe he'll fly away. Vesna's reply to that was "He won't, some birds can't fly".

== Cast ==
- Bata Živojinović - Lugar Zdravko
- Ivana Šurdić - Vesna
- Neda Arnerić - Vida
- Miodrag Krivokapić - Dušan Božić
- Petar Kralj - Dr. Mrvaljević
- Svetlana Bojković - Doctor
- Selimir Tosić - Dr. Petrović
- Jelena Žigon - Teacher
- Bata Paskaljević - Greengrocer
- Ljiljana Gazdić - Music teacher
- Vojislav Mićović - Porter
- Božidar Pavićević - Poacher I
- Miroljub Lešo - Poacher II
