= March on the Drina (film) =

- Theatrical release poster
- Directed by: Žika Mitrović
- Screenplay by: Arsen Diklić; Žika Mitrović
- Starring: Ljuba Tadić; Nikola Jovanović; Aleksandar Gavrić; Vlada Popović
- Cinematography: Milorad Marković
- Edited by: Katarina Stojanovic
- Production company: Avala Film
- Release date: July 17, 1964
- Running time: 107 minutes
- Country: SFR Yugoslavia
- Language: Serbo-Croatian

March on the Drina is a 1964 Yugoslav war film co-written and directed by Žika Mitrović. The film was released by the Avala Film studio in Belgrade. The screenplay was written by Žika Mitrović and Arsen Diklić. The title is derived from the eponymous 1914 musical composition by Stanislav Binički.

The film is based on a historical event, the Battle of Cer, which took place in 1914 during World War I. The film chronicles the experiences of a Serbian artillery battery of the Combined Division as it makes a forced march to the Cer Mountain in western Serbia to meet Austro-Hungarian troops who have invaded the country by crossing over the Drina River. The Battle of Cer was a landmark battle of World War I as the first Allied or Entente victory of the war over the Central Powers.

In 2014, the film was featured at the Zagreb Film Festival in Croatia in a series on World War I movies.

== Plot ==
The film starts with the publication of general mobilization in Serbia on July 26, 1914, in Belgrade. An artillery second lieutenant, who comes from a wealthy banking family, was assigned to the artillery battery. During the Balkan Wars of 1912–1913, he was a member of the commission, which had provided guns for the army. His family now wants to put him in the commission again. He wants to join the battery and go to war instead.

The artillery battery is deployed to western Serbia where an Austro-Hungarian attack is anticipated. They are deployed to Arandjelovac while their leaders are meeting. At the meeting, an infantry major, Kursula, gives his opinion on the main attack: Austria-Hungary will attack Serbia over the river Drina, not across the river Sava, as was expected.

On August 10, the artillery battery arrives in Aranđelovac, which expects the orders of their commanders, who are at the meeting.

On August 14, the artillery battery enters Lazarevac where it stays for a short period before again moving on. The Supreme Command of the Serbian army rejects the idea that the main attack of the Austro-Hungarian Army will be across the Sava river. The attack is expected along the Drina River. The division is, therefore, redeployed to western Serbia to the Drina.

By August 15, the battery reaches the foot of Cer Mountain where it joins in the battle.

On August 16, the Combined Division starts to struggle. Enemy forces attacked them suddenly forcing them to retreat from the position. They withdraw from Cer Mountain to save the lives of the soldiers. A sergeant from the battery quickly disassembled a gun so that if it falls into the hands of the enemy, it cannot be used in combat. Upon withdrawal, Major Kursula goes to the village Tekeriš, where the supreme command of the Serbian army resides. Kursula reports to commander General Stepa Stepanović. In the afternoon, the army counter-attacked and managed to defeat the enemy troops and force their withdrawal across the Drina River into Bosnia.

== Cast ==
- Aleksandar Gavrić as Captain Kosta Kole Hadživuković
- Ljuba Tadić as Major Kursula
- Nikola Jovanović as Second Lieutenant Veselin Veca Hadživuković
- Vladimir Popović as First Lieutenant Miloje
- Hussein Čokić as the Sergeant
- Dragomir Bojanić as Corporal Janićije
- Zoran Radmilović as Bogi Petrovic, the gambler
- Branislav Jerinić as Aleksa
- Branko Pleša as Colonel Zdravko Lukic
- Ljubiša Jovanović as General Stepa Stepanović
- Peter Prlicko as chef Trajko
- Bozidar Drnić as Trifun Hadži Vuković
- Strahinja Petrovic as uncle Laza
- Ruzica Sokić as the woman at the window
- Predrag Tasovac as Nowotny, an Austrian officer
- Predrag Milinkovic as a combat medic
- Ljubica Golubovic as the wife of Kosta
- Rastko Tadic as the farmer in the car
- Božidar Pavićević Longa assistant officer of major Kursula
- Paul Bogatincevic
- Bogdan Mihailovic as the groom Rumeni
- Miomir Radević Pigi
- Milorad Misa Volić
- Dragomir Stanojevic

== Sources ==
- Beaver, Jan G. Collision Course: Franz Conrad von Hötzendorf, Serbia, and the Politics of Preventive War. 2009.
- Dedijer, Vladimir. The Road to Sarajevo. New York: Simon and Schuster, 1966.
- Strachan, Hew. The First World War: Volume 1: To Arms. Oxford, 2001.
