= Elena Samokysh-Sudkovskaya =

Russian painter (1863–1924)

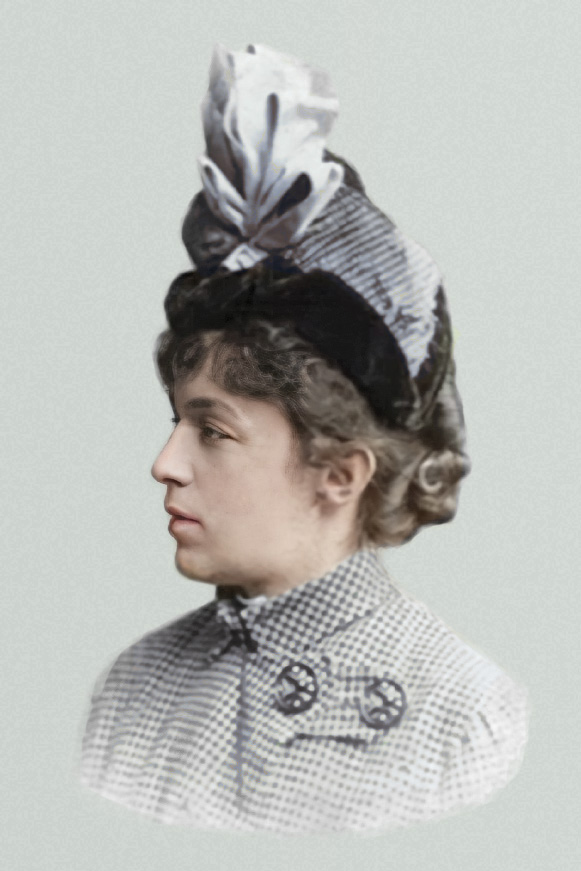
Elena Samokysh-Sudkovskaya (1881)

Elena Petrovna Samokysh-Sudkovskaya (Russian: Елена Петровна Самокиш-Судковская; née Besnard; 1863, Saint Petersburg – 1924, Vyborg or Paris) was a Russian painter and illustrator.

== Biography ==
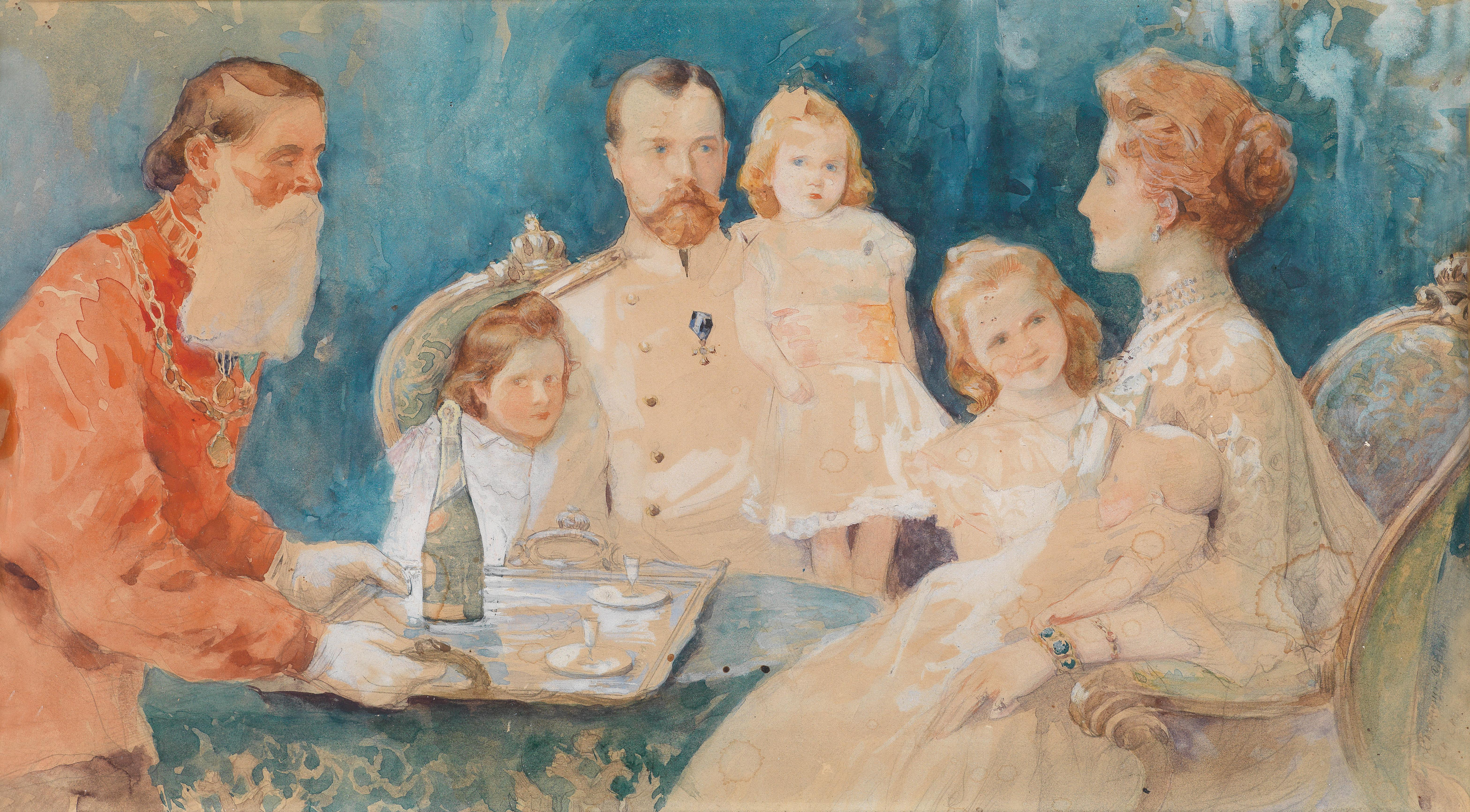
The Tsar and His Family (1902)

Her father was a Russian military engineer of French ancestry. She received her secondary education at the Pauline Institute for Women, a school for young girls of the nobility. Then, she studied drawing in Helsinki and took private classes in the workshop of V. P. Vereshchagin. In 1883, she married the painter Rufin Sudkovsky, but he died of typhus only two years later. To help her cope with her grief, she moved to Paris and took more lessons at the private academy of Jules Bastien-Lepage.

In 1889, she married another painter, Nikolay Samokish, and returned to Russia, where she worked as an illustrator for Niva, the most popular magazine in the Russian Empire at that time. She was especially known for her color illustrations in the Christmas and Easter additions and the annual calendar. She also created posters, advertisements and theater programs.

She became a member of the First Lady's Artistic Circle, which existed from 1882 to 1918, and exhibited alongside some of the most prominent painters of that time, including Ivan Shishkin and Ilya Repin. Her designs for Emperor Nicholas II's Coronation Album received an award of excellence, with a medal and blue ribbon.

Although she painted numerous portraits and genre scenes, she is probably best remembered for her book illustrations; notably the ones for Eugene Onegin by Pushkin, which were done in 1911, and those for The Little Humpbacked Horse by Yershov. Occasionally, she collaborated with her husband, producing illustrations for Dead Souls by Gogol (published by Adolf Marks in 1901) and murals for Tsarskoye Selo railway station, depicting the history of the Tsarskoye Selo Railway.

She fled to Vyborg during the Russian Revolution, then left her husband and lived in Paris during the Russian Civil War. It is generally believed that she stayed in Paris after the war was over, and died there, although some sources indicate that she returned to Vyborg.

== Illustrations from Eugene Onegin ==
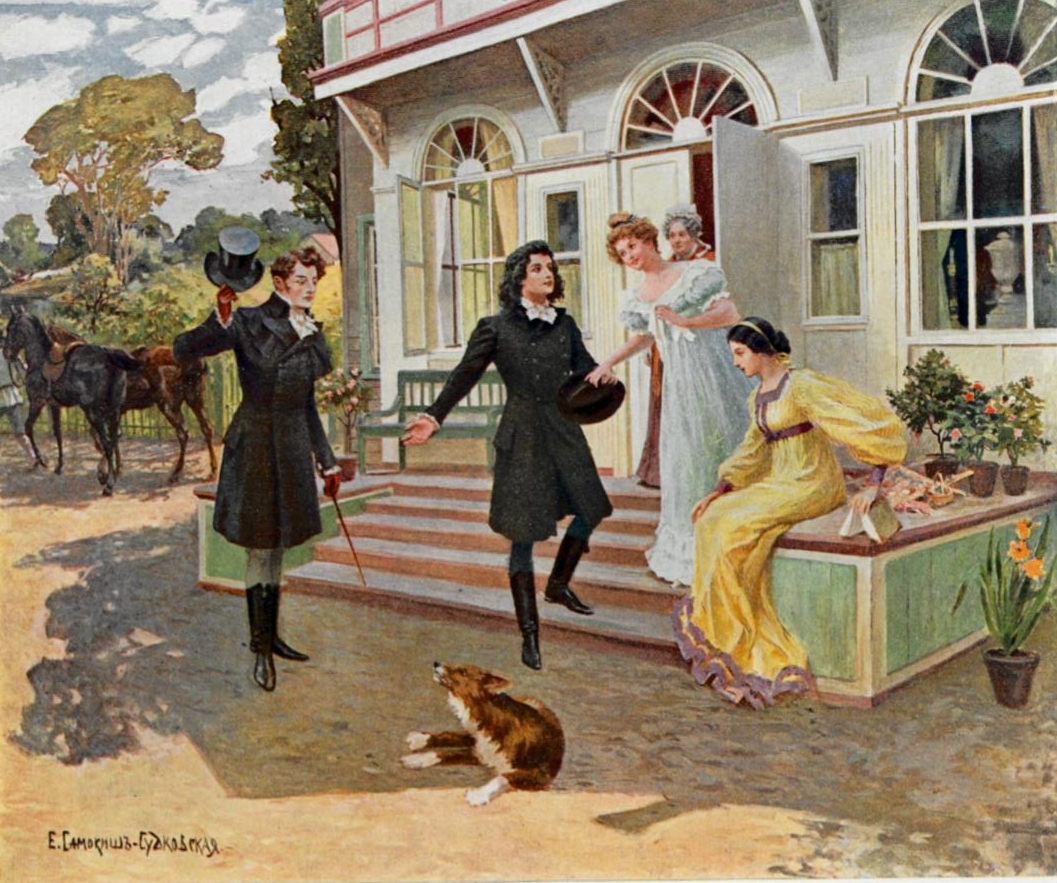
Title Page

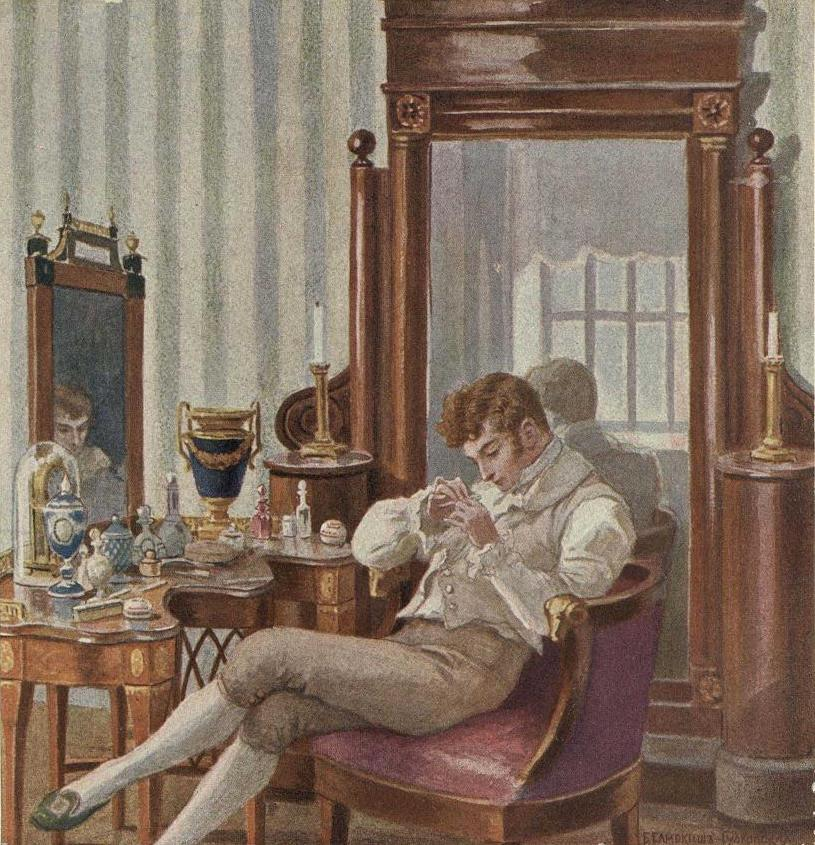
Onegin in His Study

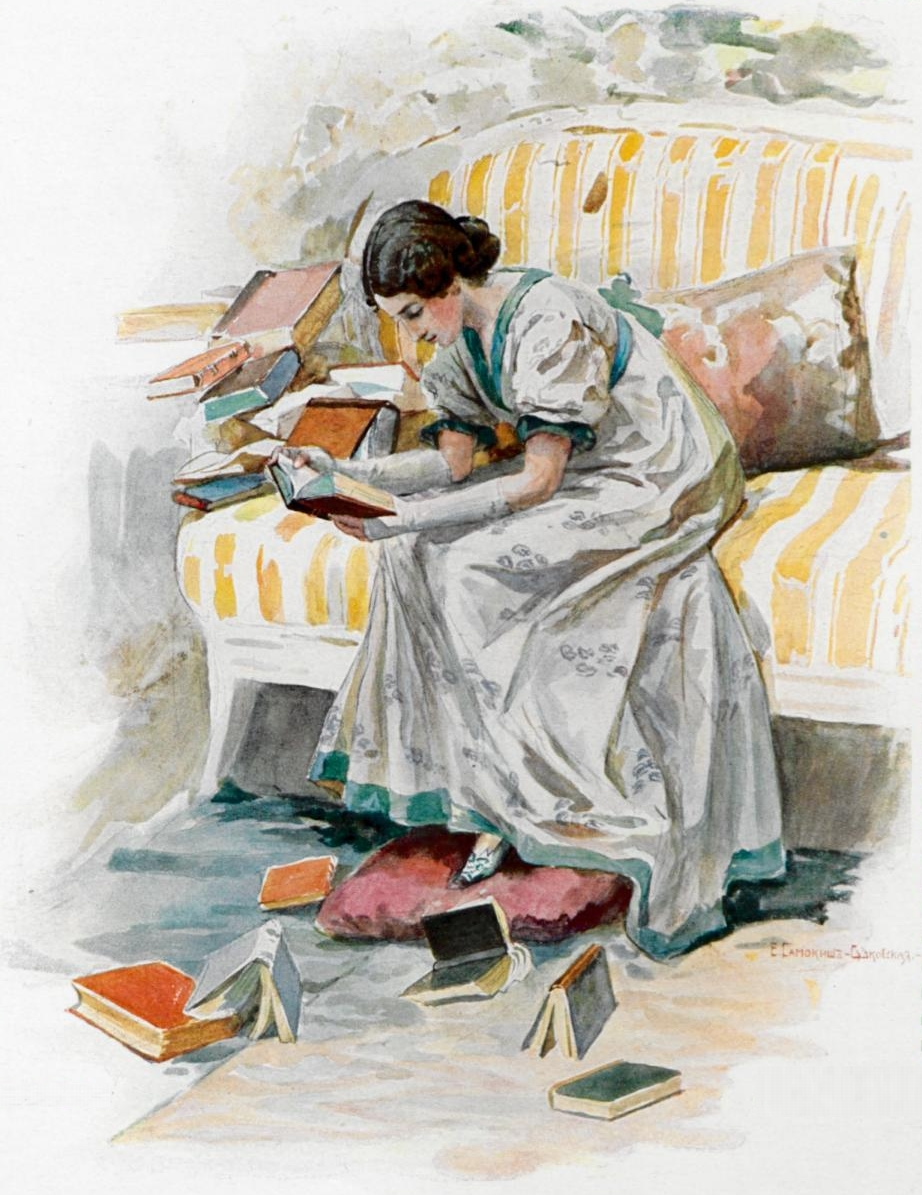
Tatiana

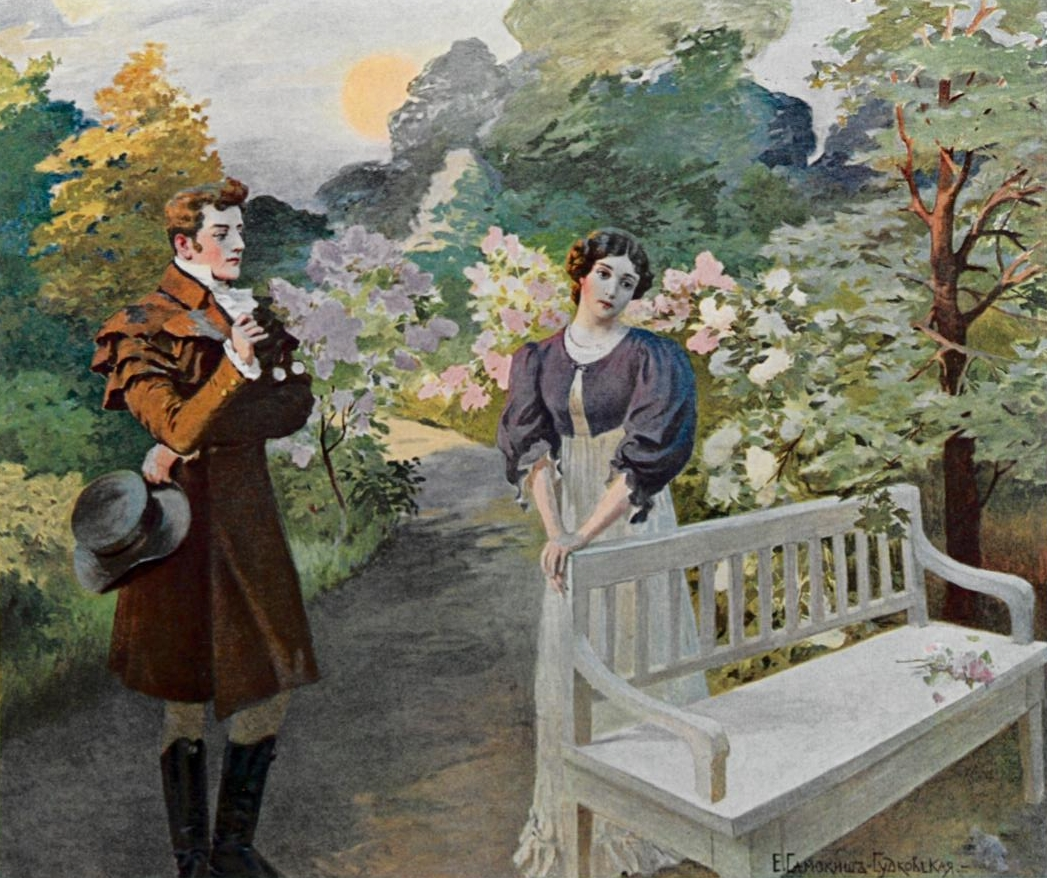
Onegin and Tatiana
