= Uzelac =

Uzelac (Serbian Cyrillic: Узелац) is a South Slavic surname and it originates from Lika and Krbava, but also from Dalmatia and Bosanska Krajina. It is predominantly used by ethnic Serbs of the Eastern Orthodox Church.

== Meaning ==
The surname has a root in the verb "ùzēti" which means "to take (away)" in Serbian and refers to the man who used to take away money from the rich and give the money to the poor.

== History ==
In Spring of 1668 census in Trnovac, Bužim or Smiljan (villages near Gospić, Croatia) there is a record of Novak Uzelac and 5 members of his family.

Among 12 other families, Uzelac's are one of the first residents and founders of Staro Selo, Lika-Senj County (Old Village) a village near Otočac, Croatia.

In 1696 Bishop Sebastian Glavinić de Glamoć (1630–1697) while visiting Lika and Krbava discovers Serbian Orthodox Priest Nikola Uzelac who was offering his services not only to Serbian Orthodox but also to Roman Catholic people as well.

In (Plemenski rječnik ličko-krbavske županije) R. Grujic notes that in 1915 census Uzelac's were the largest clan in Lika and Krbava with over 319 families. At that time all families who carried the same last name also belonged to the same clan (плеmе, pleme plural: плeмeна, plemena).

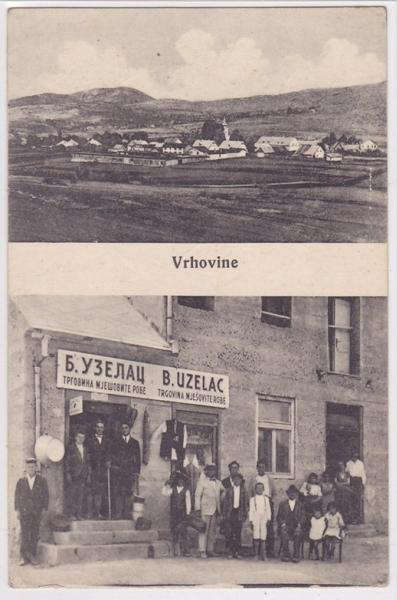
1932 postcard showing B. Uzelac Grocery Store. The store sign was written in Serbian Cyrillic and Latin alphabet as well. Vrhovine, Lika

== In the United States ==
Many Uzelac's are also found in the United States, mostly in the states of Indiana, Illinois, and Michigan. First Uzelac's in the states are recorded in 1900 Ellis Island Immigration station. The most famous Uzelac's in the United States are Kristal Uzelac, a retired gymnast, and Elliot Uzelac, former head football coach at Navy and Western Michigan University.

== People ==
- Aleksandra Uzelac (born 2004), Serbian volleyball player
- Elliot Uzelac (born 1941), American football coach
- Gregory Uzelac (born 1990), American artist and writer
- Kristal Dawn Uzelac (born 1986), American female gymnast
- Milan Emil Uzelac (1867 - 1954), Austro-Hungarian Army military commander
- Slobodan Uzelac (born 1947), Serbian politician in Croatia
- Steve Uzelac (1953 - 2025), English footballer
- Tomislav Uzelac, Croatian programmer
- Uglješa Uzelac (1938 - 1997), mayor of Sarajevo (1983 - 1985) during 1984 Winter Olympics which took place in Sarajevo
