= Kutepov's Hunting =

1911 book by Nikolai Kutepov

The Grand Princely, Tsarist and Imperial Hunting in Rus'
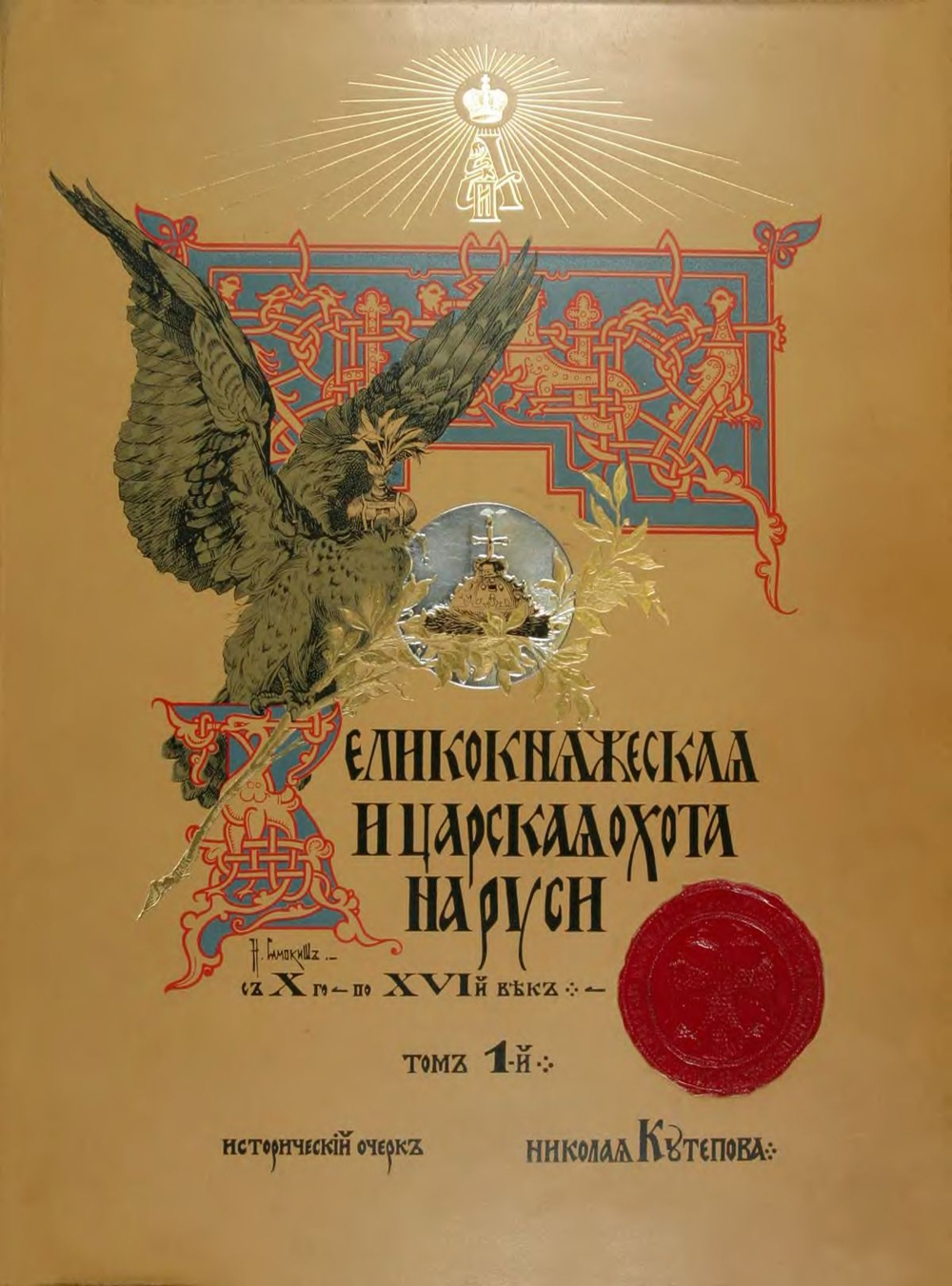
- Author: Nikolai Kutepov
- Language: Russian
- Publication date: 1896–1911
- Publication place: Russian Empire

Kutepov's Hunting, formally titled The Grand Princely, Tsarist and Imperial Hunting in Rus' (Russian: Великокняжеская, царская и императорская охота на Руси), is a book by Imperial Russian historian Nikolai Kutepov published from 1896 to 1911.

== Table of contents ==
- Book One (1896)
- Book Two (1898)
- Book Three (1902)
- Book Four (1911)

== Book illustrations ==
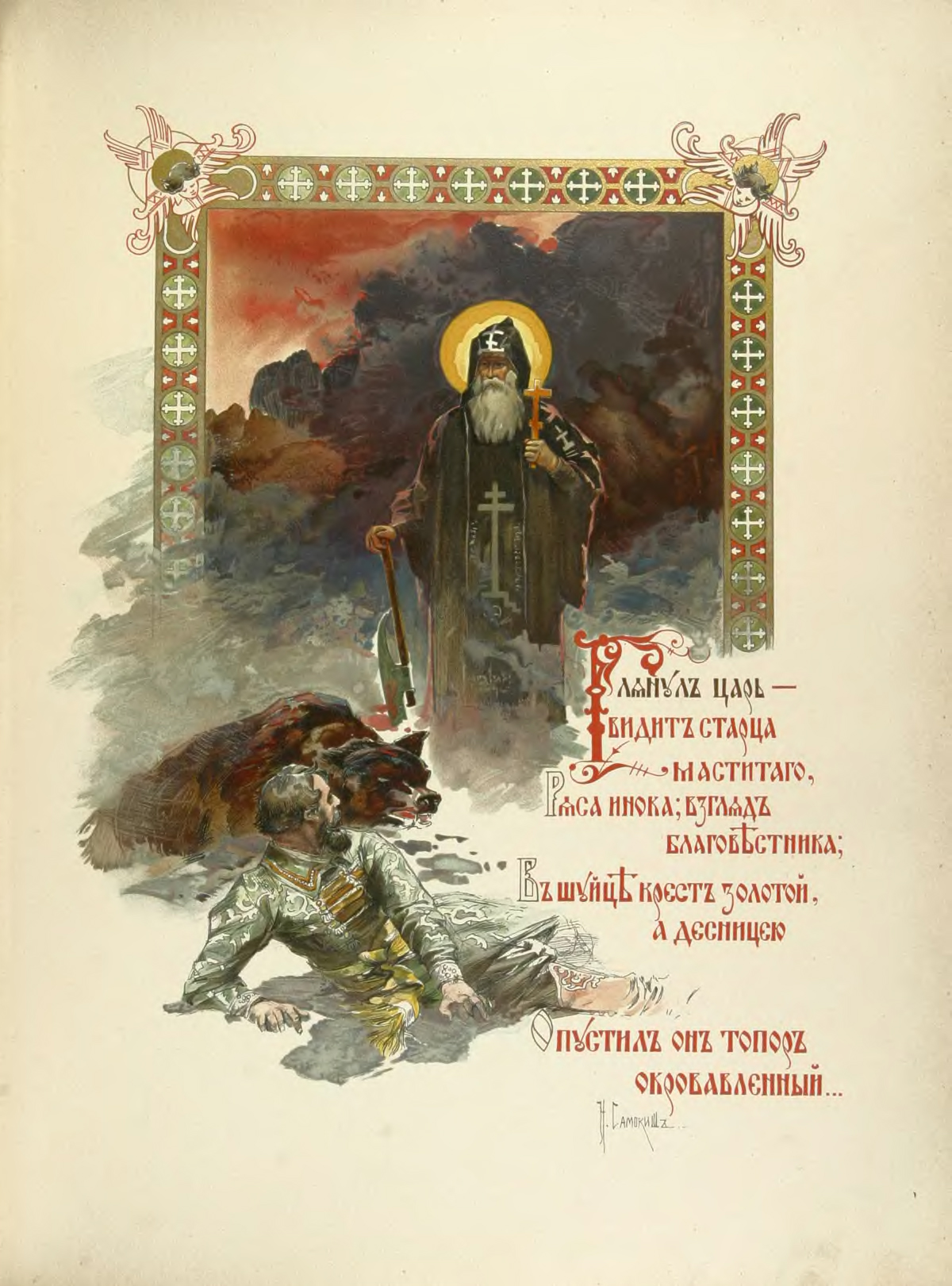

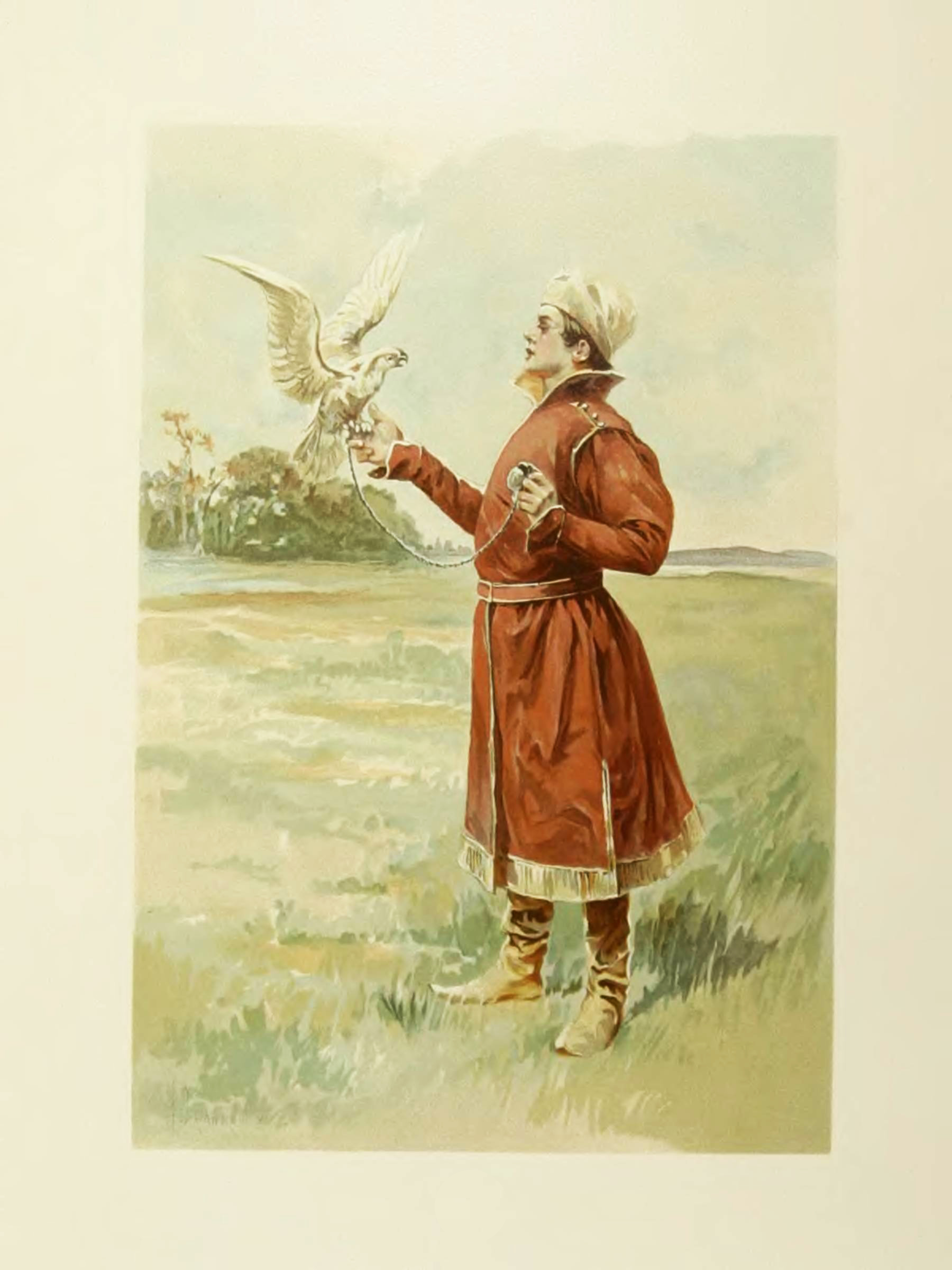

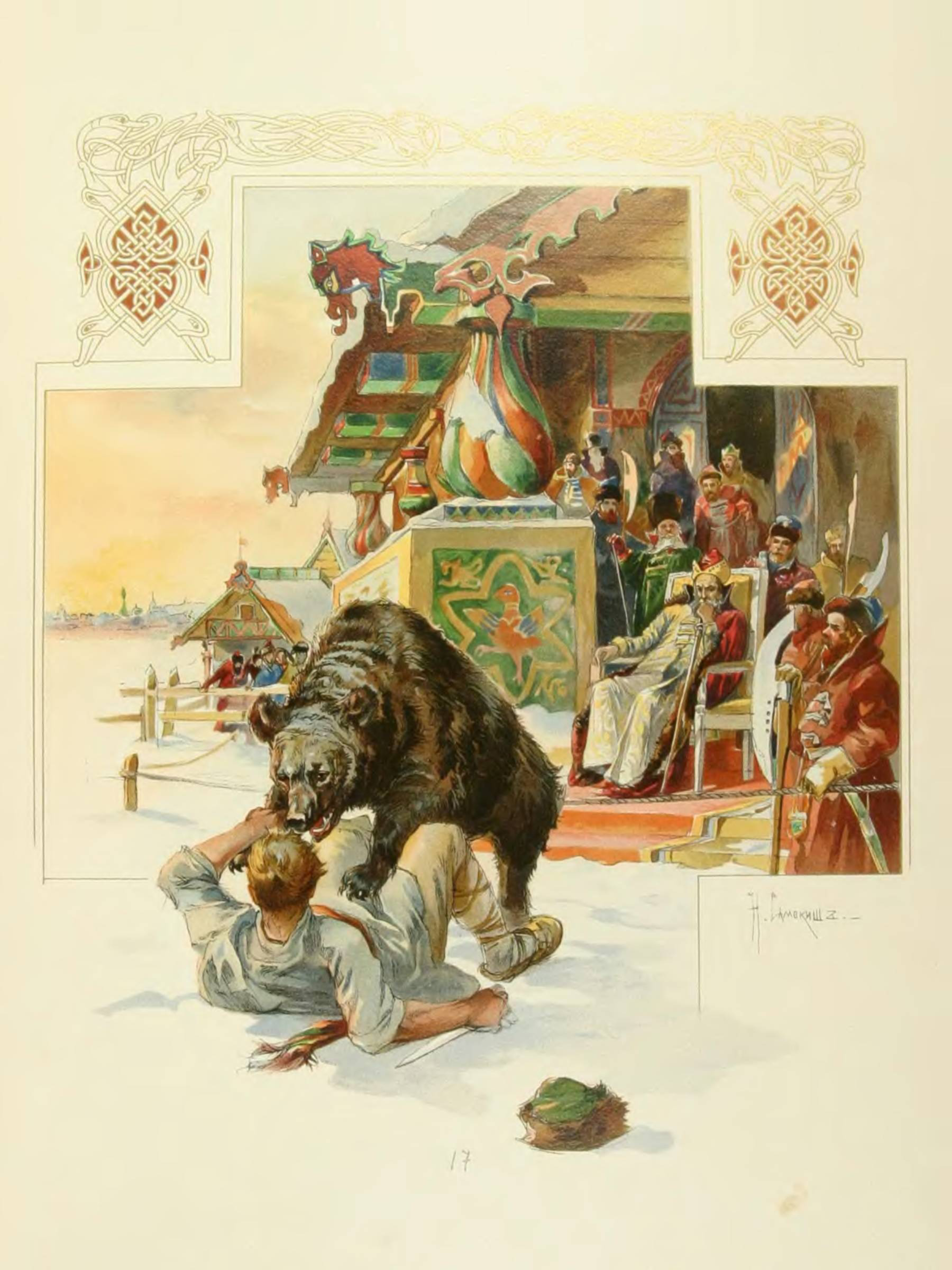

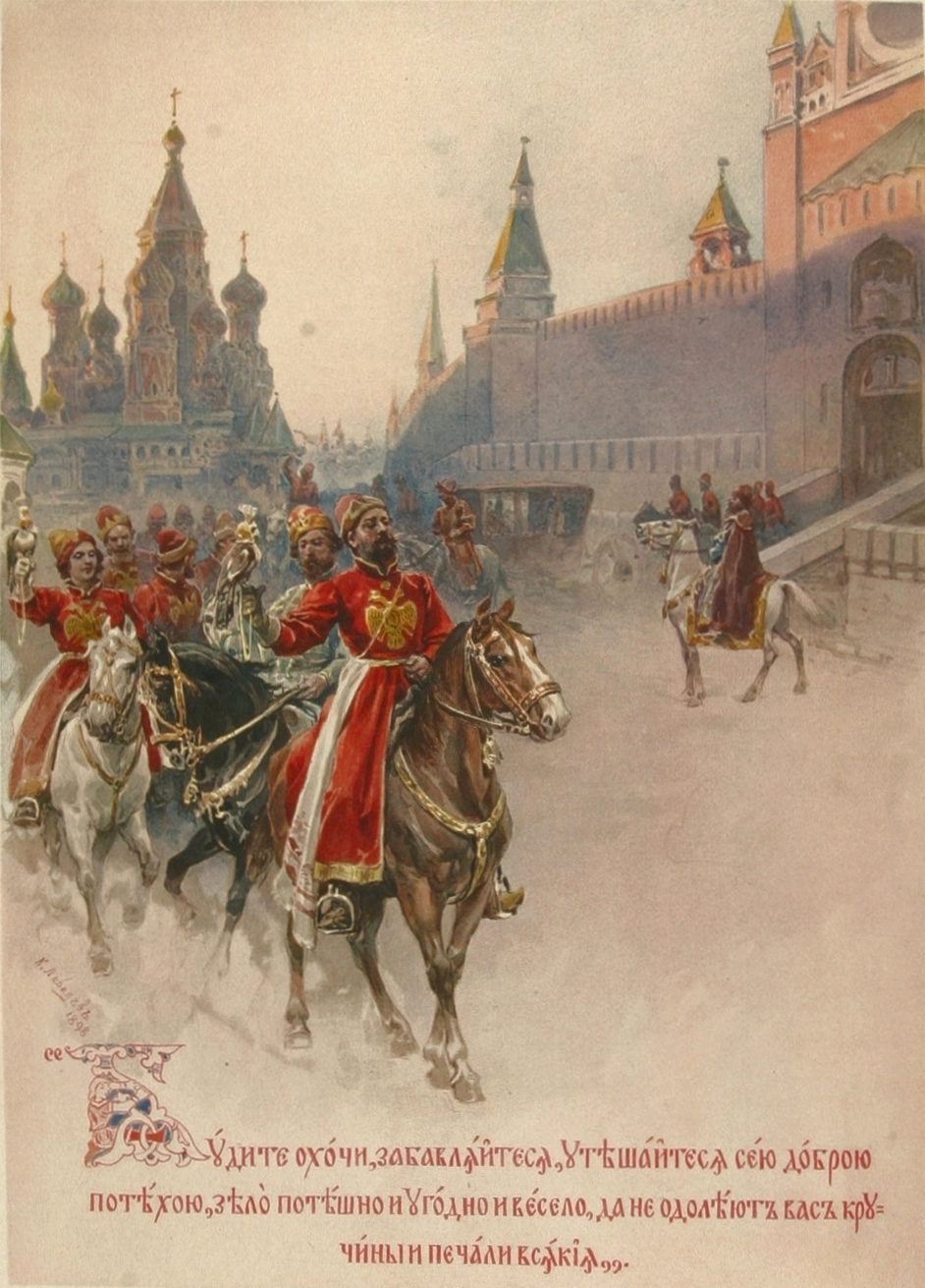

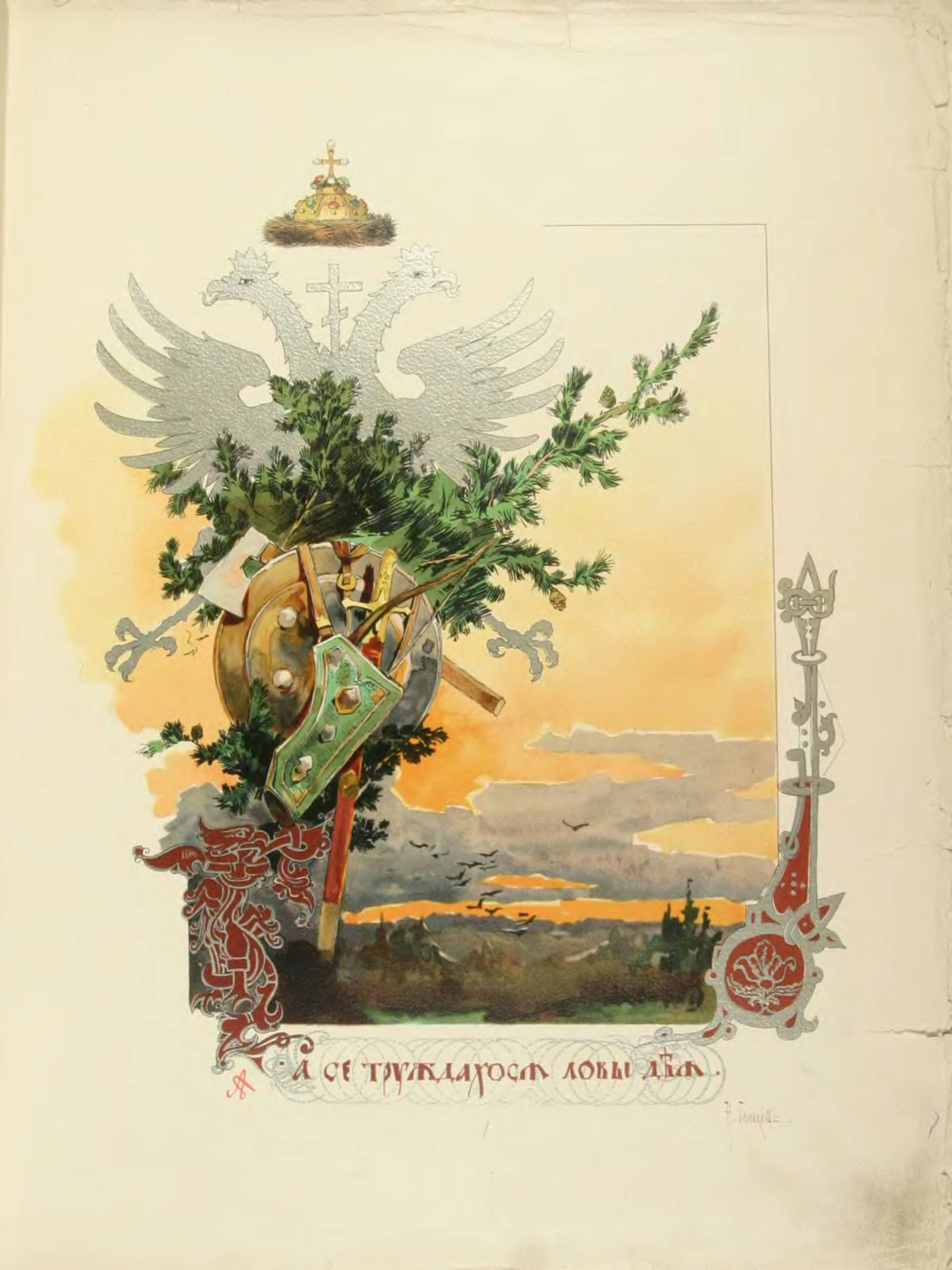
