= Božidar Pavićević =

Serbian actor

- Born: 9 January 1932; Sarajevo, Yugoslavia
- Died: 13 July 2004 (aged 72); Belgrade, Serbia
- Occupation: Actor
- Years active: 1955–1997

Božidar Pavićević (9 January 1932 – 13 July 2004) was a Serbian-Yugoslavian actor. He appeared in more than one hundred films from 1955 to 1997.

== Selected filmography ==
Year	Title	Role	Notes
1997	Some Birds Can't Fly		
1978	The Tiger		
1968	It Rains in My Village		
1967	I Even Met Happy Gypsies		
1964	March on the Drina		
