= Predrag Tasovac =

- Предраг Тасовац
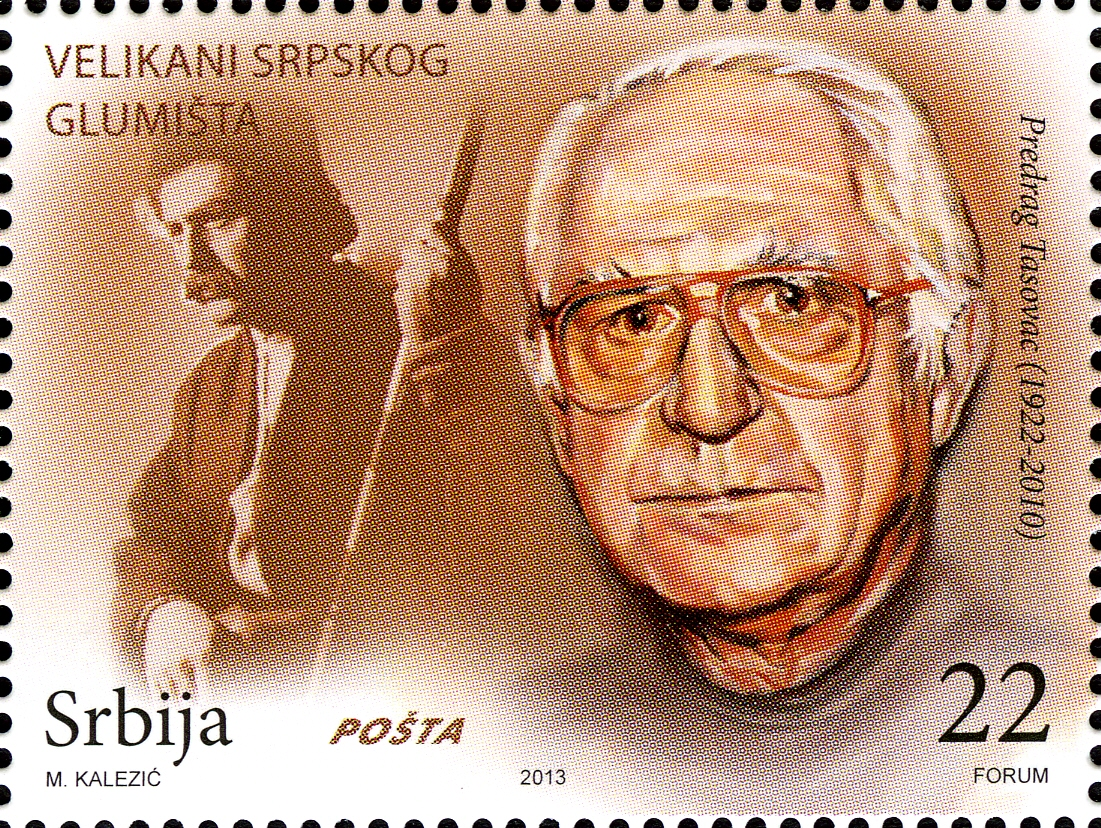
- Predrag Tasovac 2013 Serbian stamp
- Born: 9 August 1922; Bosanski Šamac, Kingdom of Serbs, Croats, and Slovenes
- Died: 22 September 2010 (aged 88); Belgrade, Serbia
- Occupation: Actor
- Years active: 1952–2005
- Children: Ivan Tasovac

Predrag Tasovac (Serbian Cyrillic: Предраг Тасовац; 9 August 1922 – 22 September 2010) was a Serbian actor. He appeared in more than eighty films from 1952 to 2005.

== Selected filmography ==
Year	Title	Role	Notes
1984	The Elusive Summer of '68	Man on the beach	
1982	A Tight Spot		
1968	Three Hours to Love		
1967	The Knife	Gartner	
1966	The Climber	Television director	
1964	March on the Drina	Nowotny	
