= Miroljub Lešo =

Yugoslav and Serbian actor (1946–2019)

- Born: 27 July 1946; Belgrade, Yugoslavia (present-day Belgrade, Serbia)
- Died: 5 March 2019 (aged 72); Belgrade, Serbia
- Occupation: Actor
- Years active: 1968-2018

Miroljub Lešo (27 July 1946 – 5 March 2019) was a Yugoslav and Serbian actor. He appeared in more than ninety films since 1968. Lešo played the role of Slavko in the television series Otpisani. He was born and died in Belgrade.

== Filmography ==
Film
Year	Title	Role	Notes
1968	Bekstva		
1973	The Battle of Sutjeska	Boro	
1973	So	Baja	
1973	Paja i Jare	Milan Kacavenda	Uncredited
1973	Bombasi		
1975	Doktor Mladen	Rade	
1975	Zimovanje u Jakobsfeldu	Pera	
1975	Backbone		
1976	Devojacki most	'Bavarac', nemacki vojnik	
1976	Salas u Malom Ritu	Pera	
1977	Hajka	Partizan	Uncredited
1977	Unterwegs nach Atlantis	Perseus	
1977	Pas koji je voleo vozove		
1977	Sudbine		
1978	Bosko Buha	Bata	
1979	Partizanska eskadrila	Partizanski kapetan	Uncredited
1980	Svetozar Markovic	Sreta Andjelkovic	
1980	Snovi, zivot, smrt Filipa Filipovica	Lazar Manojlovic	
1980	Hajduk	Zandar Gvozden Krstovic	
1981	Neka druga zena	Policijski doktor	
1981	Berlin kaputt	Avram	
1981	Pad Italije		
1981	Kraljevski voz	Masinovodja	
1982	The Smell of Quinces	Boro	
1982	Zalazak sunca		
1982	Progon	Zivin prijatelj u beloj kosulji	
1983	Mahovina na asfaltu	Radisa	
1984	Vojnici		
1984	The End of the War	Jozo	
1984	Ljubezen		
1985	The Red and the Black	Rudar	
1985	Dikiy veter	Mile Okati	
1987	The Felons	Reditelj	
1989	Beyond the Door III	Railroad Personnel	
1992	Bulevar revolucije	Taksista 1	
1994	Vukovar, jedna priča	Pljackas III	
1995	Paket aranzman		(segment "Herc minuta")
1995	Treca sreca	Svestenik 2	
1997	Some Birds Can't Fly	Lovokradica II	
2002	Frozen Stiff	Grobar	
2002	Drzava mrtvih	Pijanac I	
2006	Fade to Black	Boghera	
2016	The Rift: Dark Side of the Moon	Old Man	
2016	Jesen samuraja	Trener	
2017	Offenders	Klosar	

TV
Year	Title	Role	Notes
1975	Otpisani	Slavko	3 episodes
1976	Salaš u Malom Ritu	Pera	7 episodes
