= Nikolai Kutepov =

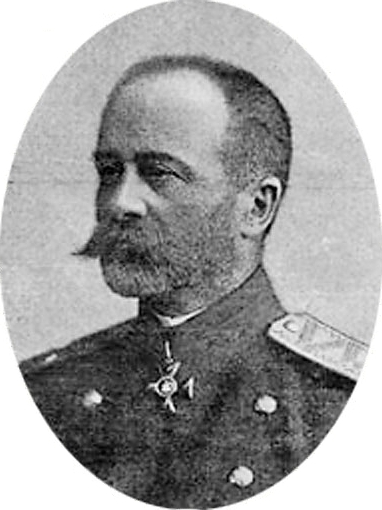
Nikolai Kutepov

Nikolai Ivanovich Kutepov (Russian: Николай Иванович Кутепов, 13 January [O.S. 1 January] 1851—11 January 1908 [O.S. 29 December 1907]/1907) was the author of fundamental Grand Ducal, Tsarist and Imperial Hunting in Russia. Kutepov has made an extensive research on subject, collecting all known documents from archives and libraries. Kutepov was also entrusted to write the appropriate article for Brockhaus and Efron Encyclopedic Dictionary. In 1893 he published A Memorable Note on the Matter of Making the Reference Collection for the History of Grand Ducal, Tsarist and Imperial Huntings in Russia ("Памятная записка о положении дела по составлению "Сбоpника матеpиалов, касающихся истоpии великокняжеской, цаpской и импеpатоpской охот в Pоссии"). In May 1894 Kutepov offered the first sample of his work to Alexander III. His final work Kutepov called "the Tsar's high quality books" ("царские книги высокого качества").
