= Arsen Diklić =

Poet, novelist and film director

Arsen Diklić (14 November 1922 – 4 July 1995) was a poet, novelist and film director of Serbian descent.

== Early life ==
Arsen was born in Staro Selo, Lika-Senj County, a village near Otočac, (modern day Croatia). He was editor of Pionir (1946-1953), Borba (1952) and the founder of Zmaj (1954). He achieved relative success with his 1956 novel Salaš u malom ritu and received October Prize for his 1964 scenario March on the Drina.
