= Ja sam rođen tamo na salašu =

Ja sam rođen tamo na salašu (Serbian Cyrillic: Ја сам рођен тамо на салашу, lit. I was born there on a farm), also known as Salaš u malom ritu (Салаш у малом риту, lit. The farm in little swamp), is a Serbian patriotic song from the province of Vojvodina. Some people consider this song as an unofficial anthem of Vojvodina. The song was used in the 1976 television series Salaš u Malom Ritu, which speaks about tragic World War II events in Vojvodina.

== Lyrics ==
Ja sam rođen tamo na salašu
Serbian Cyrillic	Serbian Latin	English translation
Ја сам рођен тамо на салашу, у равници крај малога рита, љуљали ме таласи Дунава, миловала Војвођанска жита. Ту се спаја Срем, Банат и Бачка, ту се грле три срца јуначка, ту и дете родни салаш воли, ту се срце са челиком бори. Нападали на мој салаш вуци, палили га и Немци и Турци, убијали зору кад се јави, мутили те, мој Дунаве плави. Руке слабе, али воља јака, за мном иду хиљаду момака, не дам салаш крај малога рита, не дам моја Војвођанска жита. Ал' кренуће свадбе са салаша, вратиће се ведре летње ноћи, равница ће процветати наша, хеј салаши, опет ћу вам доћи.	Ja sam rođen tamo na salašu, u ravnici kraj maloga rita, ljuljali me talasi Dunava, milovala Vojvođanska žita. Tu se spaja Srem, Banat i Bačka, tu se grle tri srca junačka, tu i dete rodni salaš voli, tu se srce sa čelikom bori. Napadali na moj salaš vuci, palili ga i Nemci i Turci, ubijali zoru kad se javi, mutili te, moj Dunave plavi. Ruke slabe ali volja jaka, za mnom idu hiljade momaka, ne dam salaš kraj maloga rita, ne dam moja Vojvođanska žita. Al' krenuće svadbe sa salaša, vratiće se vedre letnje noći, ravnica će procvetati naša, hej salaši opet ću vam doći.	I was born there on a farm, I was born in a plain, near the little swamp, the waves of the Danube were swinging me, the wheat of Vojvodina was caressing me. Srem, Banat and Bačka are connected there, three heroic hearts embrace each other there, there even a child loves the farm where it was born, there a heart fights against steel. The wolves attacked my farm, the Germans and Turks burned my farm, they killed sunrise when it rose, they stirred you, my blue Danube. My hands are weak, but my will is strong, thousands of young men will come after me, I will not give up the farm near the little swamp, I will not give up my wheat of Vojvodina. Yet, there will be weddings on the farms, the bright summer nights will return, our plain will flourish, I will come again to the farms.
