= Bata Živojinović =

Serbian actor

- Бата Живојиновић
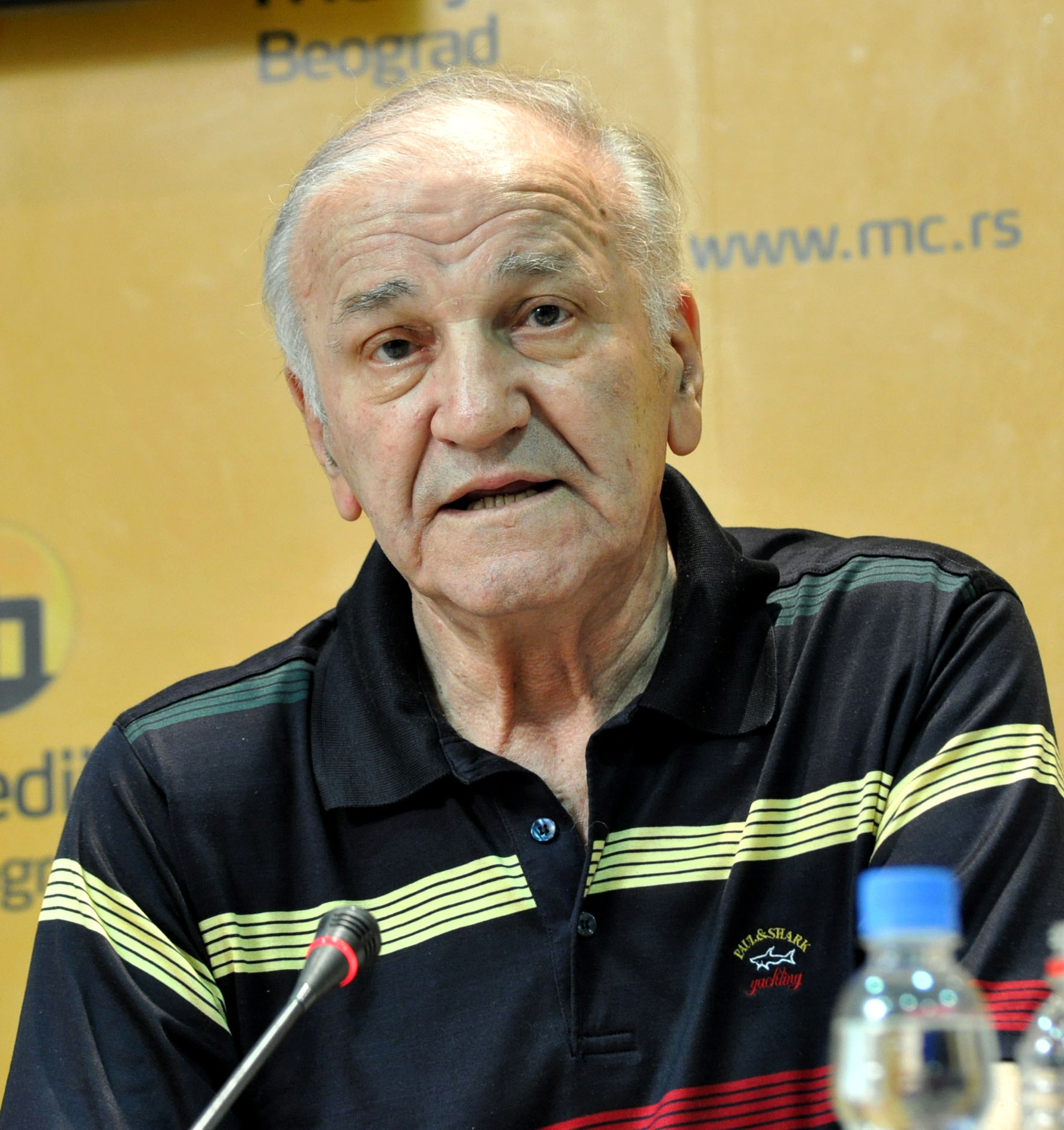
- Živojinović in 2008
- Born: Velimir Živojinović; 5 June 1933; Jagodina, Danube Banovina, Kingdom of Yugoslavia (modern Serbia)
- Died: 22 May 2016 (aged 82); Belgrade, Serbia
- Years active: 1955–2013
- Political party: SPS (1990–2003); SKJ (until 1990)
- Spouse: Julijana "Lula" Živojinović (m. 1960)
- Awards: Pula Film Festival of Yugoslavian Films: 1962 (silver), 1965, 1967, 1972 (gold); Pula Film Festival of Yugoslavian Films: 1979 (best actor), 1997 (life-time achievement award); Various: Belgrade (1972, 2006), Palić (2005), Niš (2005)...

Velimir "Bata" Živojinović (Serbian Cyrillic: Велимир "Бата" Живојиновић; 5 June 1933 – 22 May 2016) was a Yugoslav and Serbian actor and politician. He appeared in more than 340 films and TV series, and is regarded as one of the best actors in former Yugoslavia.

== Early life ==
Živojinović (nicknamed Bata) was born in the village of Koraćica under the Kosmaj mountain near Mladenovac, at the time Kingdom of Yugoslavia (now Serbia). His father, Dragoljub, was an official and his mother Tiosava was a housewife. He had two sisters, Stanka and Nada, and grew up in a patriarchal household. A conflict between Dragoljub and the Chetniks during World War II forced the family to move to Belgrade. The family lived in Crveni Krst.

Young Bata often went with his friends to the cinema, which sparked his interest in acting. Loitering around the "20th October" cinema, he watched AKUD Branko Krsmanović, a Belgrade troupe, through the window for several days until he was welcomed inside. There he befriended Soja Jovanović, instrumental in the developing of Bata's love for acting, Rade Marković, Olivera Marković, Mića Tomić, and Bata Paskaljević. After graduating from acting schools in Niš and Novi Sad, he enrolled at the Drama Academy in Belgrade.

== Career ==
Živojinović preferred acting in theatre to acting on screen, and made his screen debut in the 1955 film Pesma sa Kumbare. He played both heroes and villains and switched between leading and supporting roles. The zenith of his popularity came with World War II-themed Partisan films in the 1970s. One of his best known films from that period was Walter Defends Sarajevo (Valter brani Sarajevo), which gained major success and cult following in China.

== Politics ==
In 1990 he was elected for the Serbian Parliament, as a member of the Socialist Party of Serbia. He was a candidate in the September–October 2002 presidential election, receiving 3.27% of the popular vote.

== Illness and death ==
Živojinović had a heart attack in October 2006 and suffered from gangrene in his right foot for about three years afterwards. Doctors initially wanted to amputate the limb, but he traveled to Cuba, where his daughter lives, and within the 25 days that he spent being treated there, was cured of the gangrene by Doctor Montekin, who has also treated Venezuelan President Hugo Chávez.

On 4 July 2012 he suffered a severe stroke and was transported to a hospital specializing in cerebrovascular diseases called Sveti Sava in Belgrade. He was treated in the intensive care unit and was reported to be in critical condition. Reports also stated that after the stroke he was in a coma for two days. He remained in critical condition in the hospital for about three weeks. After treatment for the stroke, he was discharged from the hospital, but reported to not be able to walk without assistance and that it was difficult for him to speak.

On 6 May 2016, after being transferred from Sveti Sava hospital to "KBC Dedinje", he was subject of an emergency surgery which, in order to stop his gangrene, resulted in a leg amputation. He died on 22 May 2016 in Belgrade.

== Personal life ==
Živojinović was married to Julijana "Lula" since 1960. They had a daughter, Jelena, and son, Miljko, and six grandchildren. His wife died on 20 December 2019 aged 80.

Živojinović was a close friend with Croatian actor Boris Dvornik until the Croatian War. In 1991 the two renounced each other in a series of open letters, which was a gesture often seen as symbolic of the breakup of Yugoslavia. In 2004 it was reported that the two men tried to reconcile. In 2006, the two men publicly reconciled on TV via a video link between Split and Belgrade. The actor said that "In the last few years there hasn't been hatred between us", and Dvornik completed the sentence "only a misunderstanding".

He was baptized as an infant in the Serbian Orthodox Church and despite his association with communism, remained a believer until the end of his life.

== Awards and honours ==
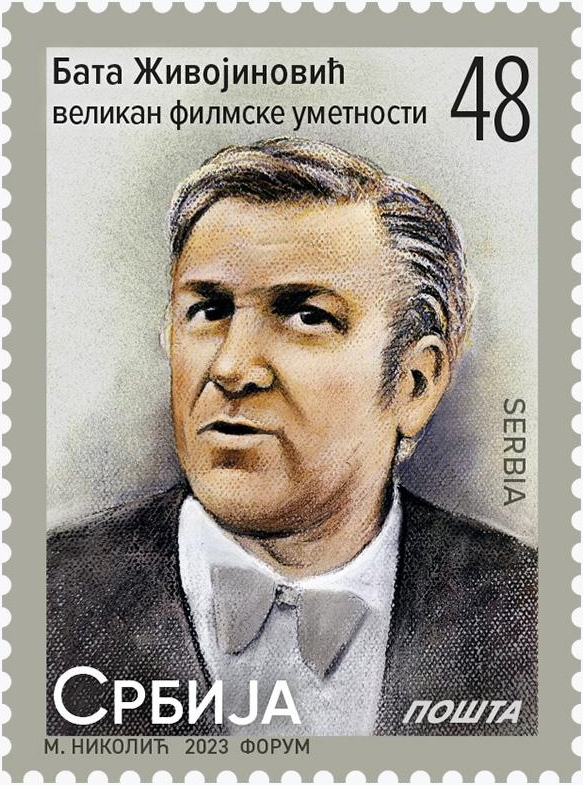
Živojinović on a 2023 stamp of Serbia

Živojinović was awarded Golden Arena for Best Actor at the Pula Film Festival, the most prestigious film award in the SFR Yugoslavia, three times: in 1965, 1967 and 1972. He also received Golden Arena for Best Supporting Actor once in 1962. He won the award for Best Actor at the 11th Moscow International Film Festival in 1979 for his role in Moment. In 1981 he was a member of the jury at the 12th Moscow International Film Festival.

He was the recipient of the October Award of the City of Belgrade in 1972, and the 7th July Award of Serbia in 1981. In August 1993, he was awarded Life Achievement Award "Slavica". In 2016 he received the life achievement award Beogradski pobednik (Belgrade Victor).

== Selected filmography ==
- Pesma sa Kumbare (1955) - Velja iz Belog Potoka
- Klisura (1956) - Ajkin brat ... drvoseca
- Poslednji kolosek (1956) - Sofer
- Cipelice na asfaltu (1958) - Mladic (uncredited)
- Subotom uvece (1957) - (segment "Doktor")
- Mali covek (1957) - Mladic na zabavi
- Rafal u nebo (1958) - Cetnik koljac
- Te noci (1958) - Pijani slikar
- Dubrowsky (1959) - Russian Soldier
- Train Without a Timetable (1959) - Duje
- Vetar je stao pred zoru (1959) - Agent policije
- Dilizansa snova (1960) - Vasilije
- Atomic War Bride (1960)
- Signal Over the City (1960) - Toso
- Uzavreli grad (1961) - Monter Luka
- Pesma (1961) - Djordje
- Dr (1962) - Dr. Milorad Cvijovic
- Kozara (1962) - Sorga
- Krst Rakoc (1962) - Beli
- Double Circle (1963) - Pavle
- Radopolje (1963) - Bozina
- Thundering Mountains (1963) - Porucnik Kostic
- Zemljaci (1963) - Jole
- Muskarci (1963) - Lale
- Covek iz hrastove sume (1964) - Profesor
- Put oko sveta (1964) - Sava Cvetkovic
- Narodni poslanik (1964) - Ivkovic
- Dobra kob (1964) - Marko
- Three (1965) - Milos Bojanic
- Laznivka (1965) - Bonivan
- Flaming Frontier (1965) - Jim Potter
- Neprijatelj (1965) - Slobodan Antic
- Looking Into the Eyes of the Sun (1966) - Mornar
- Pre rata (1966) - G. Novakovic
- The Dream (1966) - Lazar
- Povratak (1966) - Al Kapone
- Glineni golub (1966) - Kosta
- I Even Met Happy Gypsies (Skupljači perja) (1967) - Mirta
- The Knife (1967) - Islednik Marko
- Praznik (1967) - Major
- The Birch Tree (1967) - Marko Labudan
- Posalji coveka u pola dva (1967) - Djino
- Diverzanti (1967) - Korcagin
- Doctor Homer's Brother (1968) - Simon Petrović
- Visnja na Tasmajdanu (1968) - Profesor
- Uzrok smrti ne pominjati (1968) - Mitar Velimirovic
- Bekstva (1968) - Viktor
- Operacija Beograd (1968) - Pukovnik Vili Fuks
- It Rains in My Village (1968) - Ispovednik
- Ima ljubavi, nema ljubavi (1968)
- Oseka (1969) - Kum
- The Bridge (1969) - Tigar
- Battle of Neretva (1969) - Stole
- Krvava bajka (1969) - Marisav Petrovic
- Zarki (1970)
- Moja luda glava (1971) - Andrija
- Dorucak sa djavolom (1971) - Bogoljub - Bata Radulaski
- Opklada (1971)
- Zvezde su oci ratnika (1972) - Ucitelj Mladen
- Walter Defends Sarajevo (1972) - Valter
- I Bog stvori kafansku pevacicu (1972) - Ratomir Jovanic - Ratko
- Traces of a Black Haired Girl (1972) - Sinter
- The Master and Margaret (1972) - Korovjev
- The Battle of Sutjeska (1973) - Nikola
- Bombasi (1973) - Djoka
- Mirko i Slavko (1973) - Komandant
- The Dervish and Death (1974) - Muselim
- Kosava (1974) - Beli
- Hell River (1974) - Braka
- Crveni udar (1974) - Ico
- Povest o dobrih ljudeh (1975) - Peter Kostrca
- Crvena zemlja (1975) - Muzikant
- Anno Domini 1573 (1975) - Ilija Gregorić
- Naivko (1975) - Zile Akademac
- Beach Guard in Winter (1976) - Ljubicin otac
- Vrhovi Zelengore (1976) - Boro
- Povratak otpisanih (1976) - Cetnicki oficir
- Gruppenbild mit Dame (1977) - Bogakov
- Group Portrait with a Lady (1977) - Bogakov
- Ljubavni zivot Budimira Trajkovica (1977) - Vozac GSP-a
- Bestije (1977) - Bute
- Hajka (1977) - Vojvoda Juzbasic
- The Dog Who Loved Trains (1977) - Kauboj
- Foolish Years (1977) - Dr. Nedeljkovic
- Nije nego (1978) - Profesor matematike Herceg
- Stici pre svitanja (1978) - Obren
- Moment (1978) - Arsen
- The Tiger (1978) - Direktor
- Radio Vihor zove Andjeliju (1979) - Petrinja
- Drugarcine (1979) - Kosta
- Usijanje (1979) - Zandarm
- Partizanska eskadrila (1979) - Vuk
- Pozorisna veza (1980) - Milan, visi inspektor
- Special Treatment (1980) - Direktor
- Rad na odredjeno vreme (1980) - Milutin
- Snovi, zivot, smrt Filipa Filipovica (1980)
- Erogena zona (1981) - Pera 'Zver'
- Crveniot konj (1981) - Boris Tusev
- High Voltage (1981) - Cukic
- Dorotej (1981) - Dadara
- Sesta brzina (1981) - Svetolik Trpkovic 'Pufta'
- The Fall of Italy (1981) - Grgo Kusturin
- Sok od sljiva (1981) - Uca
- Lov u mutnom (1981) - Paja 'Glavonja'
- Laf u srcu (1981) - Doktor
- The Promising Boy (1981) - Masin otac
- Idemo dalje (1982) - Sopenhauer
- 13. jul (1982) - Stevanov otac
- Progon (1982) - Domacin Joca
- Nedeljni rucak (1982) - Dr. Dusan Arandjelovic
- Moj tata na odredjeno vreme (1982) - Milutin Rakocevic
- Balkan Express (1983) - Stojcic
- Kakav deda takav unuk (1983) - Dr. Nedeljkovic
- Stepenice za nebo (1983) - Komsija
- Halo taxi (1983) - Suger
- Jos ovaj put (1983) - Dzek
- Igmanski mars (1983) - Badza
- Great Transport (1983) - Kosta
- Timocka buna (1983) - Kapetan Sibin
- Idi mi, dodji mi (1983) - Dr. Nedeljkovic
- Secerna vodica (1983) - Major Djuric
- Pejzazi u magli (1984) - Ivanov otac
- Maturanti (Pazi sta radis) (1984) - Funkcioner
- Unseen Wonder (1984) - Otac Makarije
- In the Jaws of Life (1984) - Trokrilni
- Sta je s tobom, Nina (1984) - Miloje
- Opasni trag (1984) - Inspektor Kosta Markovic
- Balkan Spy (1984) - Palacinkar
- The End of the War (1984) - Bajo Lazarević
- Mala pljačka vlaka (1984) - Todor Strasni
- No problem (1984) - Brenin Menadzer
- Groznica ljubavi (1984) - Jordan Cvetkovic
- Cao inspektore (1985) - Boki
- Nije lako sa muskarcima (1985) - Milos
- I to ce proci (1985) - Kapetan Mika
- Ada (1985) - Mladen
- Zivot je lep (1985) - Visoko pozicionirani drug
- Drzanje za vazduh (1986) - Buzdovan
- Debeli i mrsavi (1986) - Aco Popara - Zver
- Sest dana juna (1986) - Pilot 1
- Zikina dinastija (1986) - Dr. Nedeljkovic
- U zatvoru (1986) - Upravnik
- The Promised Land (1986) - Markan, predsjednik zadruge
- Osveta (1986) - Milivoje Pekar
- Sekula i njegove zene (1986) - Ceda
- Posljednji skretnicar uzanog kolosijeka (1986) - Marko Mrgud
- Druga Zikina dinastija (1986) - Dr. Nedeljkovic
- Majstor i Sampita (1986) - Jova
- Razvod na odredjeno vreme (1986) - Milutin Rakocevic
- Miss (1986) - Kokos
- Dobrovoljci (1986) - Vatrogasac
- Days to Remember (1987) - Onkel Savo
- Oktoberfest (1987) - Skoblar
- Lutalica (1987) - Gazda Daca
- The Felons (1987) - Preiskovalni
- Let's Fall in Love (1987-1989, part 1, 2) - Komandir Milanovic
- Vuk Karadžić (1987-1988, TV Series) - Jakov Nenadovic
- A Better Life (1987-1991, TV Series) - Aleksandar 'Macola' Kostic
- Vanbracna putovanja (1988) - Gerasim Miletic
- Vikend na mrtovci (1988) - Generalen direktor
- Tajna manastirske rakije (1988) - Abdullah the Great
- Tesna koza 3 (1988) - Sotir Milivojevic
- Sulude godine (1988) - Dr. Nedeljkovic / Dr Smiljanic
- Spijun na stiklama (1988) - Ruzic
- Ransom (1988)
- Jednog lepog dana (1988) - Gospodin Mihailo
- Balkan ekspres 2 (1989) - Stojko
- Atoski vrtovi - preobrazenje (1989) - Komesar
- War and Remembrance (1989, TV Mini-Series) - Jewish Partisan Leader
- The Fall of Rock and Roll (1989) - Krsta Klatic-Klaja
- Vampiri su medju nama (1989) - Boki
- Battle of Kosovo (1989) - Srbin Hamza
- Sex-partijski neprijatelj br. 1 (1991) - Ciganin Sekula
- Aliens are to Blame for Everything (1991) - Boki
- Sekula se opet zeni (1991) - Ceda
- Holiday in Sarajevo (1991) - Inspektor Felini
- The Original of the Forgery (1991) - Vujic
- Bracna putovanja (1991) - Gerasim Miletic
- Prokleta je Amerika (1992) - Kamiondzija Radovan
- Velika frka (1992) - Sima
- Dama koja ubija (1992) - Boki
- Three Tickets to Hollywood (1993) - Mrgud
- Pun mesec nad Beogradom (1993) - Aleksin otac
- Slatko od snova (1994) - Baks
- The End of Obrenović Dynasty (1995, TV Series) - Aleksa Novakovic
- Tamna je noc (1995) - Komandant policijskog odreda
- Treca sreca (1995) - Ujka Zivota
- Pretty Village, Pretty Flame (1996) - Gvozden
- Dovidjenja u Cikagu (1996) - Boki
- Balkanska pravila (1997) - Sef
- Ptice koje ne polete (1997) - Lugar Zdravko
- The Wounds (1998) - Covek na tenku
- Kupi mi Eliota (1998) - Adam Tabakera
- Barking at the Stars (1998) - Bozovic
- Cabaret Balkan (1998) - The Bosnian Serb Father, the Bus Driver
- The Dagger (1999) - Nicifor Jugovic
- The White Suit (1999) - Gospodin
- Ranjena zemlja (1999) - Aleksic
- Shadows of Memories (2000) - Ljuba Radovanovic
- War Live (2000) - Tatula
- Seljaci (2001) - Jeremija
- Sve je za ljude (2001) - Jeremija
- Frozen Stiff (2002) - Stanislav
- Amir (2002) - Amirjev oce
- Ivkova Slava (2005) - Mirko
- Made in YU (2005) - Farfar
- Princ od papira (2007) - Opasni cica
- The Sisters (2011, TV Movie) - Deda Rade
- My Beautiful Country (2012) - Special Guest
- Led (2012) - Deda Zivotije

== See also ==
- List of Yugoslavian films
- Politics of Serbia
