= Looking Into the Eyes of the Sun =

- Pogled u zjenicu sunca
- Directed by: Veljko Bulajić
- Cinematography: Krešimir Grčević
- Edited by: Josip Remenar
- Music by: Vladimir Kraus-Rajterić
- Production company: Jadran Film
- Release date: 1966
- Running time: 92 minutes
- Country: Yugoslavia

Looking Into the Eyes of the Sun (Pogled u zjenicu sunca) is a 1966 Yugoslav film directed by Veljko Bulajić and starring Bata Živojinović, Antun Nalis, Faruk Begolli, Mladen Ladika, and Milena Dravić.

== Plot ==
In a snowstorm, four Partisans get separated from their unit. Three of them are suffering from typhoid fever, and the only healthy man among them is trying to return them to safety...

== Production ==
Looking Into the Eyes of the Sun was shot in just 31 working days. Although Bulajić's name was usually associated with high-budget productions, he gave Looking Into the Eyes of the Sun and The Man to Destroy as counterexamples, describing them as "the two cheapest films in the history of Jadran Film".

== Reception ==
Looking Into the Eyes of the Sun was shown in the out of competition section of the 1966 Cannes Film Festival. The Croatian Film Association's database describes it as one of the most peculiar Bulajić's films which, instead of epic sweep, opts for a visually expressive, naturalist drama of a handful of isolated individuals.
