= Branka Bešević Gajić =

Serbian filmmaker

- Бранка Бешевић Гајић
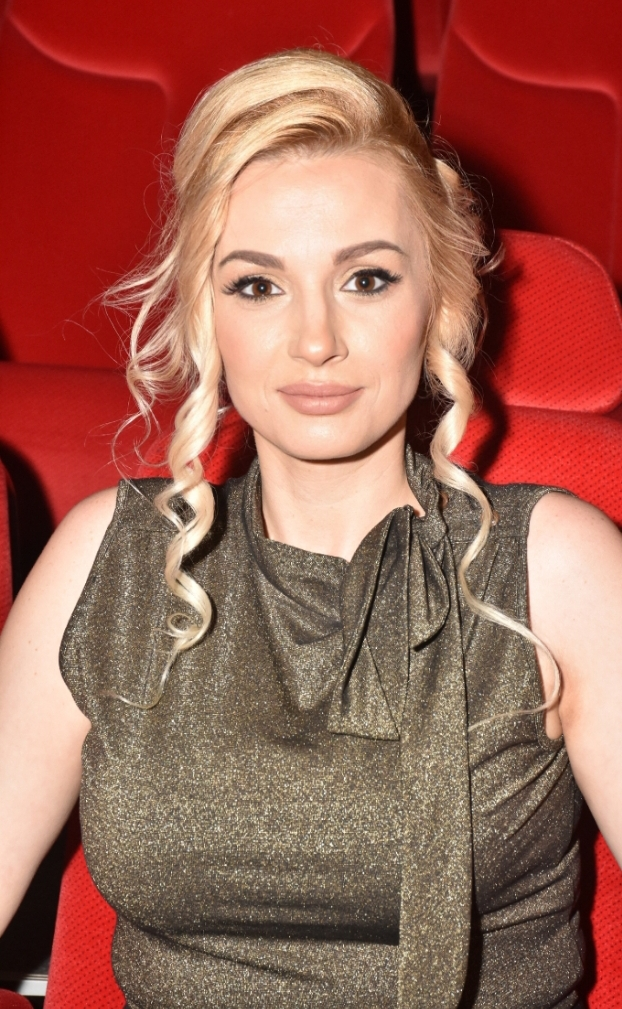
- Born: Branka Bešević; 18 September 1982 (age 43); Pančevo, PR Serbia, FPR Yugoslavia
- Occupation(s): Film director, Creative producer, Screenwriter
- Years active: 2009–present

Branka Beševic Gajić is a Serbian and Croatian film and TV director, creative producer and screenwriter. She is a member of the European Film Academy based in Berlin.

== Career ==
She holds a Master's degree in Drama and audiovisual arts. She graduated in the class of professor Goran Peković, at the Faculty of Dramatic Arts in Belgrade and Interdisciplinary Arts Ph.D. at the University of Arts in Belgrade with the film directing at feature Interactive movie The Decision (Odluka).

In 2014 she debuted as director and screenwriter of the film Lauš, a film about the life of Yugoslav actor Žarko Laušević. The film features over twenty major names of Serbian culture. After a premiere at Sava Center in Belgrade, the film was distributed in Serbia as well as in the Balkan region, followed by screenings at a series of festivals in Toronto, New York City, Sydney, Brisbane, Adelaide, Perth, Vulagong, Melbourne, Canberra, Beijing, Johannesburg, and Moscow, where it won awards for directing, artistic contribution, and the author's courage.

== Awards ==
- "GRAND PRIX" for "The Home of Angels (Dom anđela)" at the International Festival "Zlatna Buklija" (2017)
- City Fest (2019)
