= Great Transport =

1983 film

- Original title: Veliki transport
- Directed by: Veljko Bulajić
- Written by: Donald R. Boyle; Arsen Diklić; Veljko Bulajić
- Produced by: Drasko Redjep (Executive producer); Alan E. Salke (Executive producer); Herbert F. Solow (Executive producer); Srdjan Ilic (Producer); Paul Lichtman (Producer)
- Starring: James Franciscus; Steve Railsback; Robert Vaughn; Helmut Berger; Edward Albert
- Cinematography: Dušan Ninkov
- Edited by: Vesna Lažeta
- Music by: Miljenko Prohaska; Vladimir Kraus-Rajterić
- Production company: Lanterna Editrice
- Release date: 5 July 1983
- Running time: 126 minutes
- Country: Yugoslavia
- Language: Serbo-Croatian

Great Transport (Serbo-Croatian: Veliki transport) is a 1983 Yugoslav action–drama war film directed by Veljko Bulajić. The film was selected as the Yugoslav entry for the Best Foreign Language Film at the 56th Academy Awards, but was not accepted as a nominee. Great Transport stars James Franciscus, Steve Railsback, Robert Vaughn, Helmut Berger, and Edward Albert.

== Plot ==
In May 1943, Yugoslav Partisans' HQ in Vojvodina decides to send reinforcements to beleaguered Partisan units in eastern Bosnia. A convoy of more than a thousand volunteers carrying food, clothes and medicine, led by Pavle Paroški, embarks on a dangerous mission. They are joined by Paroški's girlfriend Dunja, doctor Emil Kovač, and British major Mason and his radio operator Danny, who are tasked with establishing the communications with the Partisans.

== Cast ==
- James Franciscus as John Mason
- Steve Railsback as Pavle Paroški (voiced by Marko Nikolić)
- Robert Vaughn as Dr. Emil Kovač (voiced by Vanja Drach)
- Helmut Berger as Colonel Glassendorf
- Edward Albert as Danny
- Joseph Campanella as German Major (voiced by Peter Carsten)
- Bata Živojinović as Kosta
- Dragana Varagić as Dunja
- Zvonko Lepetić as Baća
- Ljiljana Blagojević as Dragana
- Tihomir Arsić as Jocika
- Dragomir Felba as Tima
- Dragan Bjelogrlić as Bora
- Dušan Janićijević as Commander Miloš

== Release and reception ==
Great Transport was released in Yugoslavian theatres on 5 July 1983. The film was released on DVD.

Bulajić's attempt of emulating the epic scope of Battle of Neretva (1969) did not find success with the critics, and was ignored by the audiences, who saw it as an anachronism, particularly in the times of economic adversity in Yugoslavia in the 1980s. Its failure marked the end of an era of epic Yugoslav partisan films.

== See also ==
- List of submissions to the 56th Academy Awards for Best Foreign Language Film
- List of Yugoslav submissions for the Academy Award for Best Foreign Language Film
