= Bridge on the Neretva =

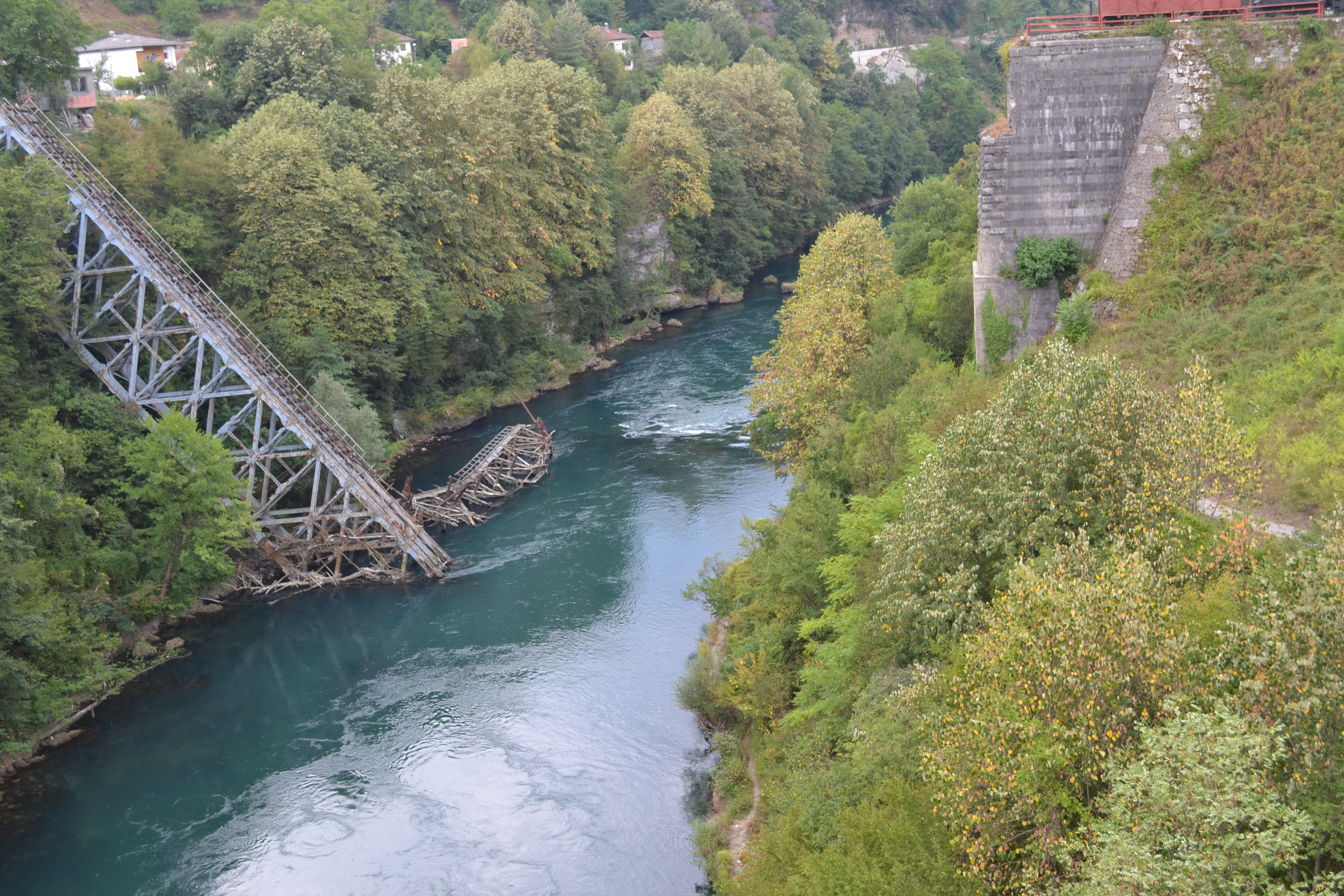
- Coordinates: 43.654111°N 17.762222°E
- Crossed: Neretva
- Locale: Jablanica
- Official name: Memorial Bridge on the Neretva
- Owner: Municipal Council of Jablanica
- Maintained by: J.U. Muzej "Bitka za ranjenike na Neretvi" Jablanica
- Heritage status: National Monument of Bosnia and Herzegovina by Commission to preserve national monuments of Bosnia and Herzegovina 13 July 2009
- Website: www.muzej-jablanica.com/ba/en/

Characteristics
- Design: Inverted bowstring truss 1888-1943; Deck truss 1943-1968
- Material: Iron, steel
- Pier construction: stone, concrete
- Total length: 78m
- Width: 5m
- Height: 8m collapsed
- Water depth: 2-3m
- Traversable?: no
- No. of spans: 1
- Piers in water: no

Rail characteristics
- No. of tracks: 1

History
- Constructed by: Austria-Hungary; Germans; Energoinvest
- Construction end: 1888
- Dedicated: to the "Battle for the Wounded"; Memorial of the Battle on the Neretva
- Rebuilt: 7 March 1943 Partisans' 2nd Dalmatian Brigade constructed provisional; August 1943 German constructed anew; 1978 memorial.
- Collapsed: 8 March 1943
- Destroyed: 4 March 1943, 1968
- Replaced by: provisional wooden structure used and demolished between 7–8 March 1943; German constructed new in August 1943; Memorial bridge on 1978.

The Bridge on the Neretva is the memorial bridge on the Neretva river, in Jablanica, Bosnia and Herzegovina. Bridge is part of the Memorial of the Battle on the Neretva dedicated to the famous World War II battle, fought between Yugoslav partisans and Axis forces, as part of the Fourth Enemy Offensive in February–March 1943. The battle is also known as the "Battle for the Wounded on the Neretva" or simply the "Battle for the Wounded".

== Location ==
The bridge is part of the historical cultural landscape, that houses the Museum of the Battle for the Wounded on the Neretva river, in town of Jablanica, and number of smaller memorial sites and monuments, scattered across the municipality Jablanica and neighboring municipalities territories. The museum was opened by Josip Broz Tito on 12 November 1978 to commemorate the 35th anniversary of the battle. It has been proclaimed a national monument of Bosnia and Herzegovina, by the Commission to preserve national monuments on 13 July 2009, as published in the Official Gazette of Bosnia and Herzegovina, no. 97/09.

== Bridge history and constructive elements ==
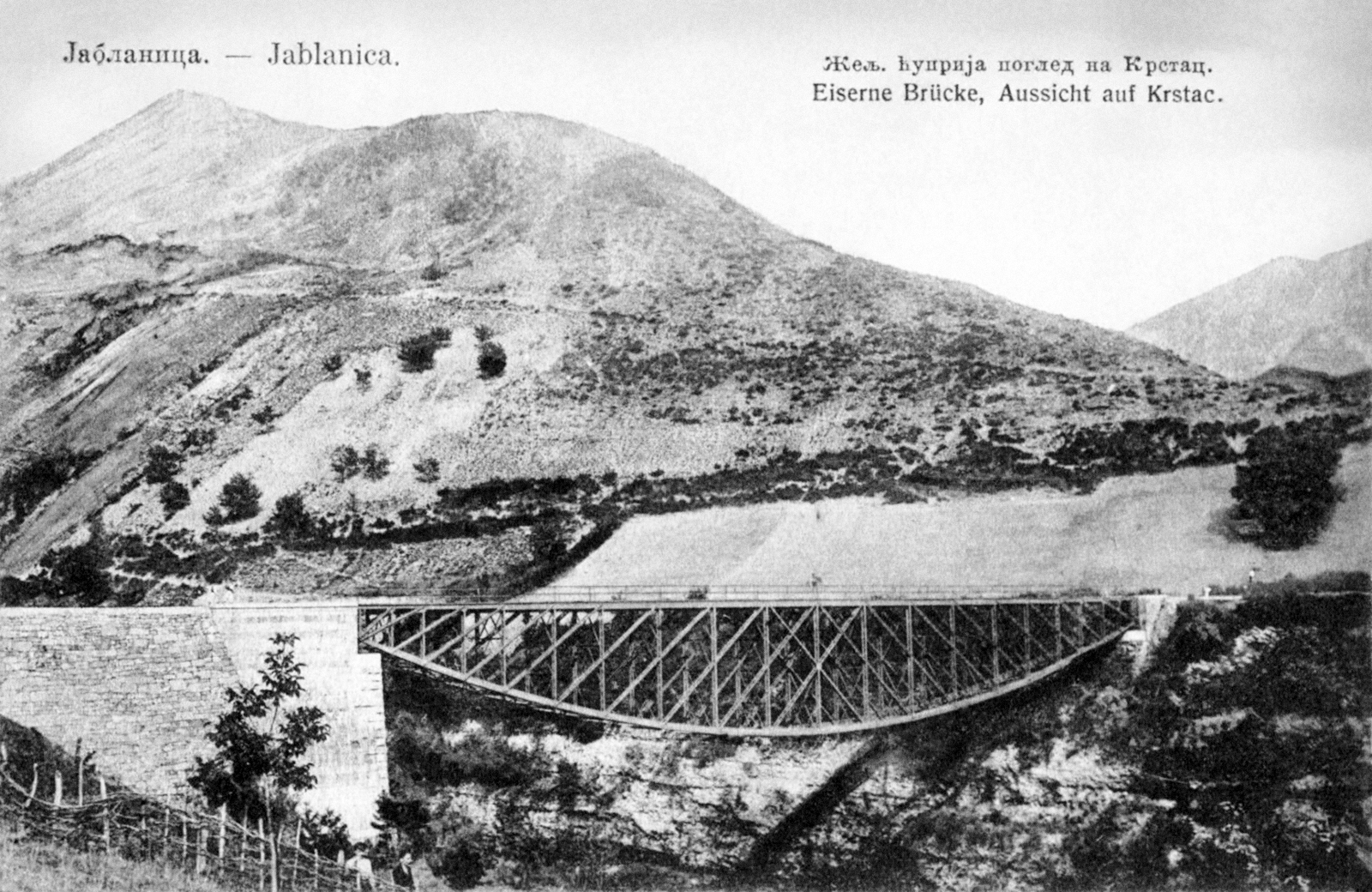
Famous bridge's original structure before it was blown up by Partisans.

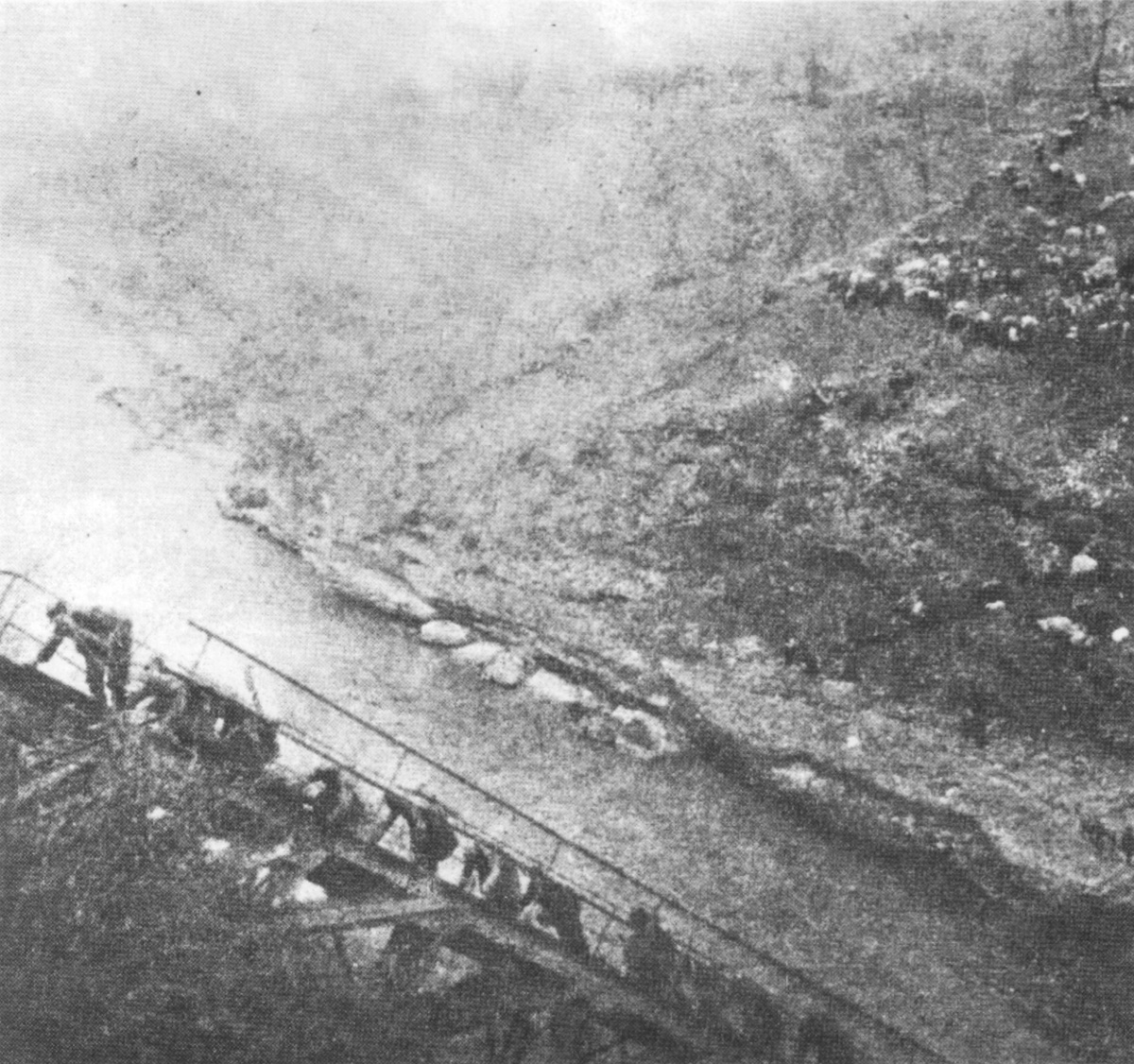
Partisans crossing the Neretva by climbing over the broken part of the bridge on the left bank.

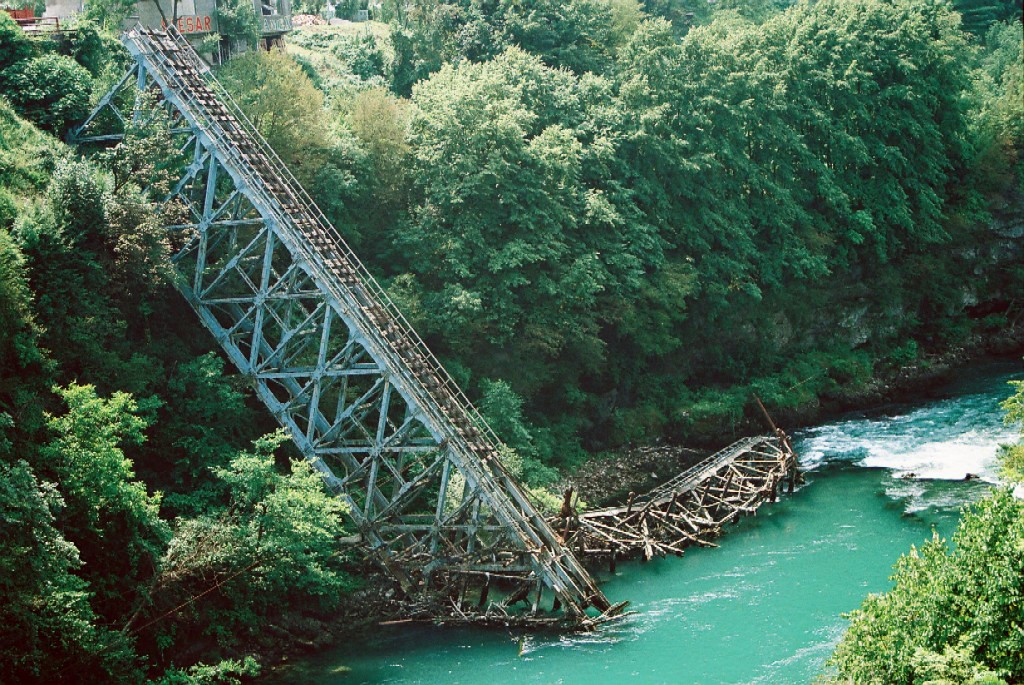
Destroyed bridge on the Neretva was twice-built and twice-destroyed during its history, hence the structural deviation from the original.

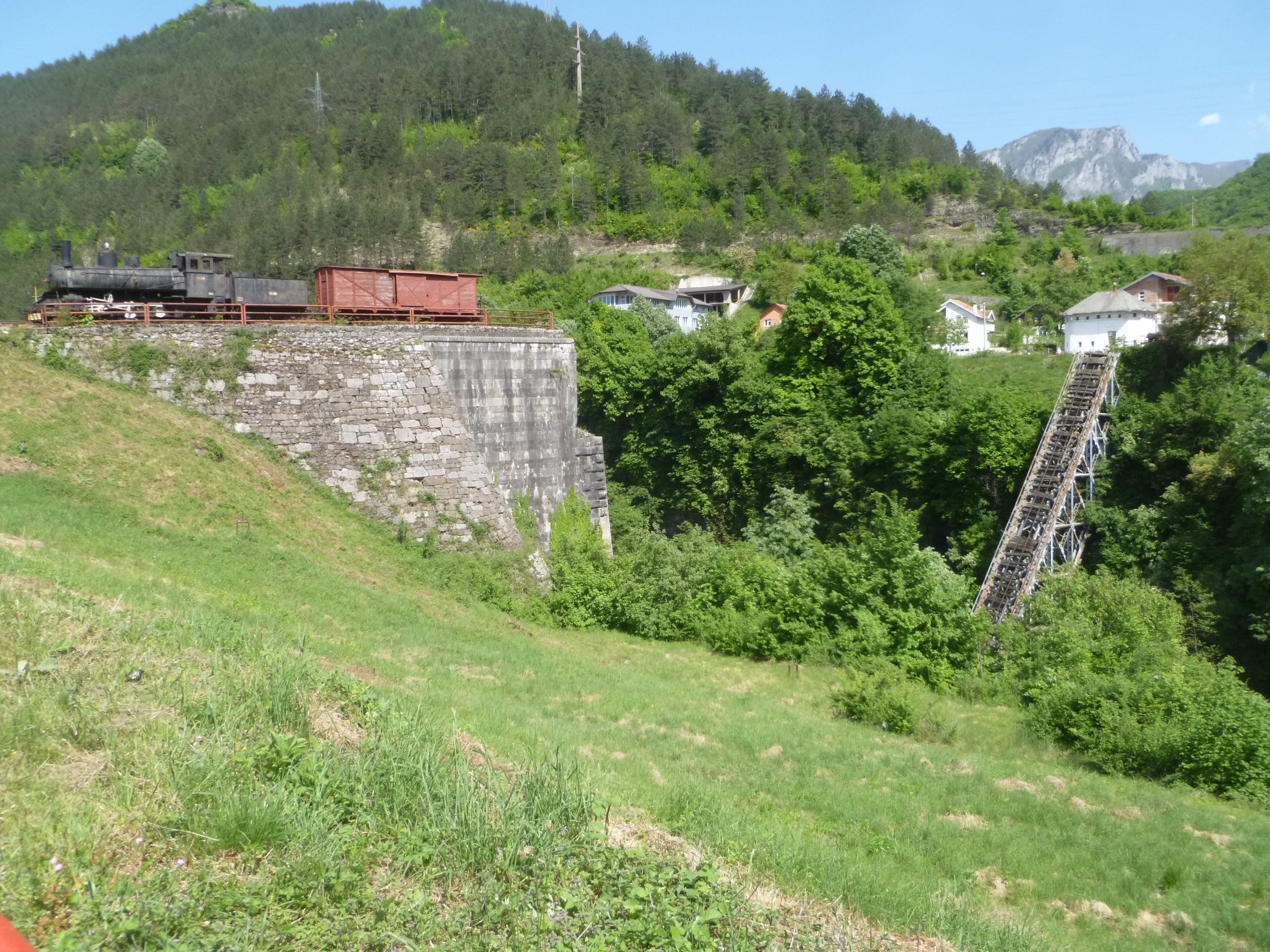
Memorial complex today, with bridge structure altered for the purpose of film production.

The bridge was built in 1888. The iron-lattice structure was first commissioned and made in Hungary and was planned to bridge the Neretva river in Jablanica. By mistake, it was made shorter by 4 meters, so it was moved to Mostar and installed as the Bridge of Emperor and King Franz Joseph I. A new bridge for Jablanica was commissioned in England and later erected. The bridge that was built in 1888, with a linear grid and an inverted arch on the underside of the bridge. The arch range was 78 m and the arch arrow was 10 m. It was supported by stone-built walls on both banks, and the depth of the bridge iron-lattice structure at the points of support was 3 meters.

Between 1 March and 4 March 1943, the Partisans demolished all the bridges on the Neretva and Rama, from Karaula to Ostrožac. Between 7 March and 8 March, in just 18 hours, a wooden provisional bridge, 56 m long and 2.5 m wide, was built.

In August 1943, the Germans built a new bridge, which was a spatial grid of rectangular cross-section. The span of the bridge was 78 m and the height of the grid 8 m. The width of the bridge was 5 m. The bridge relied on existing stone-built supports. The grid height at the support points was smaller and was 5 m on either side of the bridge. This bridge was again demolished in 1968 during the filming of the Oscar-nominated film "Battle on the Neretva" by director Veljko Bulajić.

As part of the project for the Museum of the Battle for the Wounded on the Neretva River in Jablanica, a reconstruction project for the Memorial Bridge was completed in May 1977. The existing latticework of the demolished railway bridge, which after its demolition in 1968 fell to the left bank of the Neretva, has remained to this day with the necessary works on protection against further collapse and deterioration.

The bridging of the Neretva river between the pedestrian paths on the right bank toward the existing part laying on the left bank is done by a construction of the missing part of the bridge. This new part is placed from the right bank almost horizontally, with a slight slant towards the part of the bridge on the left bank, and is attached to the new concrete foundations in the Neretva riverbed and on the slope of the right bank. Along the new part of the bridge, wooden transverse beams are laid upstream, over which there is a wooden bridge floor. This wooden part of the memorial was used by visitors to cross from right to left bank, echoing and honoring crossing during the battle.

However, in 1991, the swollen Neretva river ripped off entire new section of the bridge, both steel and wooden elements. A major reconstruction project has been prepared and the Bosnia and Herzegovina Electricity Company pledged to finance and work to rebuild the bridge.

== In popular culture ==
The 1969 Oscar-nominated motion picture The Battle of Neretva depicts these events.

Alistair MacLean's 1968 thriller novel Force 10 From Navarone, subsequently filmed, also brings forth the fight of outnumbered Partisans against Germans and Chetniks, and the blowing up of the Neretva bridge. But the actual historical events are not in play, and the story is entirely fictional.

== Literature ==
- "Main construction project: Jablanica Memorial Bridge" - Miloš Janjić, M.Eng.; Energoinvest Sarajevo, 1977

== See also ==
- Case White
- Anti-partisan operations in World War II
