= Potraga za zmajem =

- Directed by: Jane Kavcic
- Written by: Slavko Goldstein; Zivorad Mitrovic
- Starring: Ivica Pajer; Jelena Bjelicic; Zlatko Madunic
- Production company: Jadran Film
- Release date: 23 November 1961
- Running time: 1h 22m
- Country: Yugoslavia
- Language: Serbo-Croatian

Potraga za zmajem is a Croatian film directed by Jane Kavčič. It was released in 1961.
