= Skoplje '63 =

1964 film

- Poster designed by Zlatko Zrnec
- Directed by: Veljko Bulajić
- Written by: Jovan Boškovski; Stevan Bulajić; Ratko Đurovic; Mateja Mateski; Đorđe Stardelov
- Produced by: Stipe Gurdulić; Risto Teofilovski
- Cinematography: Živorad Milić; Ljube Petkovski; Dragan Salkovski; Aleksandar Sekulović
- Edited by: Veljko Bulajić
- Music by: Vladimir Kraus-Rajterić
- Production companies: Jadran Film; Vardar Film
- Release date: 12 March 1964
- Running time: 77 minutes
- Country: Yugoslavia
- Languages: Serbo-Croatian; Macedonian

Skoplje '63 (Note: Skoplje is the Serbo-Croatian form of Skopje (Macedonian Скопје)) is a 1964 Yugoslavian (Croatian and Macedonian) documentary film directed by Veljko Bulajić about the 1963 Skopje earthquake. The film documents and interprets the aftermath the earthquake, especially its social consequences. It is presented as a film within a film, with citizens of Skopje commenting on the documentary during its screening. Among the material is one of the first recorded concerts of Esma Redžepova, performing Chaje Shukarije.

The filming started three days after the earthquake and lasted for four months. After that, Bulajić spent 12 months editing the footage at Jadran Film studios.

It was screened at the 1964 Cannes Film Festival, but wasn't entered into the main competition. The film was awarded the Golden Nymph award at the Monte Carlo Television Festival, and it was selected as the Yugoslav entry for the Best Foreign Language Film at the 37th Academy Awards, but it was not accepted as a nominee. In 2020, a poll of Croatian film critics voted it the 10th best Croatian documentary film of all time.

== See also ==
- List of submissions to the 37th Academy Awards for Best Foreign Language Film
- List of Yugoslav submissions for the Academy Award for Best Foreign Language Film
