= Ivica Pajer =

Croatian actor

Ivica Pajer (9 September 1934 – 17 August 2006) was a Yugoslav and Croatian actor. He is perhaps best known for portraying David before he became a king in the 1960 film David and Goliath starring Orson Welles of which Pajer is credited as Ivo Payer. Pajer also had one of the major roles in The Road a Year Long, a 1958 Academy Award-nominated film directed by Giuseppe De Santis.

== Filmography ==
Year	Title	Role	Notes
1958	The Road a Year Long	Lorenco	
1959	Train Without a Timetable	Nikolica	
1959	Nights of the Teddy Boys	Straca	
1960	David and Goliath	David	
1961	Potraga za zmajem	Marko	
1962	Caesar the Conqueror	Claudius Valerian	
1965	Treasure of the Petrified Forest	Sigmund	
1973	Little Mother		
1975	Anno Domini 1573	Kupinic	
1976	Private Vices, Public Virtues	General	
1977	Cross of Iron		Uncredited
1977	Fliers of the Open Skies	Simun	
1978	Occupation in 26 Pictures	Vuko	
1978	The Last Mission of Demolitions Man Cloud	Luka	
1979	The Man to Destroy	Ruski Knez	
1979	Devil's Island	Partizanski komandant	
1982	Sophie's Choice	Sophie's Father	
1986	The Promised Land	Porotnik	
1989	Seobe		
1989	Donator	Dusan Spasic	
1990	Death of a Schoolboy		
1991	Srcna dama	Piero	
1991	Prica iz Hrvatske		
1996	The Seventh Chronicle	Roko	(final film role)
