= Atomic War Bride =

1960 film

- DVD cover
- Directed by: Veljko Bulajić
- Written by: Cesare Zavattini
- Starring: Antun Vrdoljak; Zlatko Madunić; Ljubiša Jovanović; Ita Rina; Janez Vrhovec; Bata Živojinović
- Cinematography: Krešo Grčević
- Edited by: Blaženka Jenčik
- Music by: Vladimir Kraus-Rajterić
- Production company: Jadran Film
- Release date: 1960
- Running time: 84 minutes
- Country: FPR Yugoslavia
- Language: Serbo-Croatian

Atomic War Bride (Serbo-Croatian: Rat, lit. 'War') is a 1960 Yugoslav science-fiction and drama film directed by Veljko Bulajić.

The film won three Golden Arena awards at the 1960 Pula Film Festival, including for Best Director (Veljko Bulajić), Best Actor (Antun Vrdoljak) and Best Scenography (Duško Jeričević), and was nominated for the Golden Lion award at the 1960 Venice Film Festival.

== Plot ==
At a church in the country, eternally optimistic John marries Maria, unaware that a nuclear war is about to begin, and she becomes his Atomic War Bride.
