= List of Yugoslav submissions for the Academy Award for Best Foreign Language Film =

Best International Feature Film submissions from Yugoslavia

Highlights
- Debut: 1958
- Submissions: 29
- Nominations: 6
- Oscar winners: none
- Final submission: 1991

Yugoslavia submitted films for the Academy Award for Best Foreign Language Film (Note: The category was renamed to the Academy Award for Best International Feature Film in April 2019, after the Academy deemed the word "Foreign" to be outdated.) category from 1958 to 1991. The award is handed out annually by the United States Academy of Motion Picture Arts and Sciences to a feature-length motion picture produced outside the United States that contains primarily non-English dialogue. It was not created until the 1956 Academy Awards, in which a competitive Academy Award of Merit, known as the Best Foreign Language Film Award, was created for non-English speaking films, and has been given annually since.

Yugoslavia received eight nominations receiving nine nominations between 1958–1985, but none of them won the award.

After 1992, the country was officially dissolved and succeeded by Bosnia, Croatia, Kosovo, Montenegro, North Macedonia, Serbia and Slovenia. All of them have been submitting films regularly ever since.

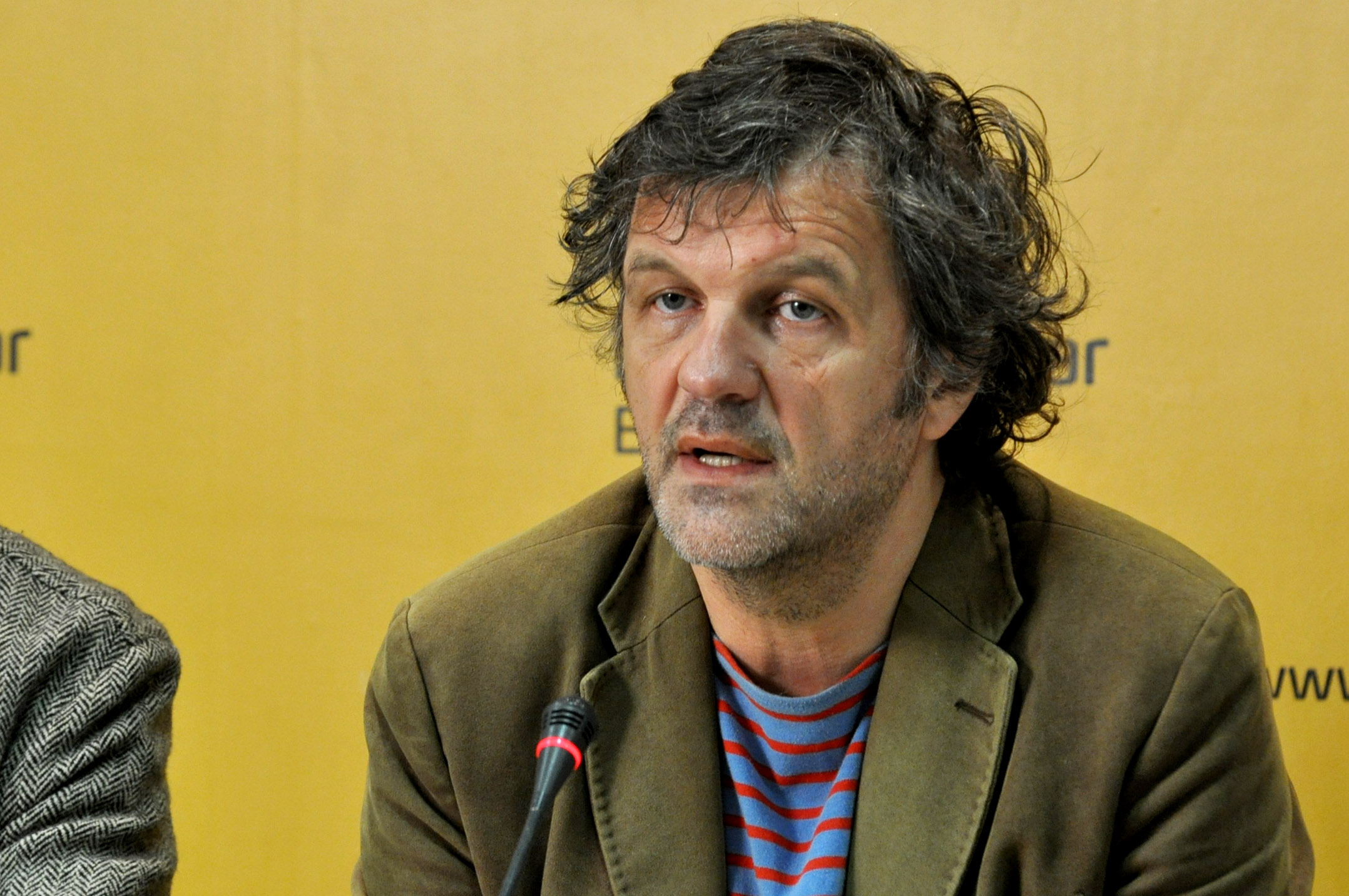
Emir Kusturica was the last Yugoslav director nominated for the Academy Award before the breakup of Yugoslavia, for When Father Was Away on Business.

== Submissions ==
The Academy of Motion Picture Arts and Sciences has invited the film industries of various countries to submit their best film for the Academy Award for Best Foreign Language Film since 1956. The Foreign Language Film Award Committee oversees the process and reviews all the submitted films. Following this, they vote via secret ballot to determine the five nominees for the award.

Below is a list of the films that have been submitted by the Yugoslavia for review by the academy for the award by year and the respective Academy Awards ceremony.

Year (Ceremony)	Film title used in nomination	Original title	Language(s)	Director(s)	Result
1958 (31st)	The Road a Year Long	La strada lunga un anno	Italian	Giuseppe De Santis	Nominated
1959 (32nd)	Train Without a Timetable	Vlak bez voznog reda	Serbo-Croatian	Veljko Bulajić	Not nominated
1960 (33rd)	The Ninth Circle	Deveti krug	Serbo-Croatian	France Štiglic	Nominated
1963 (36th)	Kozara	Kozara	Serbo-Croatian	Veljko Bulajić	Not nominated
1964 (37th)	Skopje '63	Skopje '63	Serbo-Croatian	Veljko Bulajić	Not nominated
1966 (39th)	Three	Tri	Serbo-Croatian	Aleksandar Petrović	Nominated
1967 (40th)	I Even Met Happy Gypsies	Skupljači perja	Serbo-Croatian	Aleksandar Petrović	Nominated
1968 (41st)	It Rains in My Village	Biće skoro propast sveta	Serbo-Croatian	Aleksandar Petrović	Not nominated
1969 (42nd)	The Battle of Neretva	Bitka na Neretvi	Serbo-Croatian, English	Veljko Bulajić	Nominated
1971 (44th)	Black Seed	Црно семе	Macedonian	Kiril Cenevski	Not nominated
1972 (45th)	The Master and Margaret	Majstor i Margarita	Serbo-Croatian, Italian	Aleksandar Petrović	Not nominated
1973 (46th)	The Battle of Sutjeska	Sutjeska	Serbo-Croatian, English, German	Stipe Delić	Not nominated
1974 (47th)	The Dervish and Death	Derviš i smrt	Serbo-Croatian	Zdravko Velimirović	Not nominated
1975 (48th)	The Day That Shook the World	Sarajevski atentat	Serbo-Croatian, Czech, English, German	Veljko Bulajić	Not nominated
1976 (49th)	The Rat Savior	Izbavitelj	Serbo-Croatian	Krsto Papić	Not nominated
1978 (51st)	Occupation in 26 Pictures	Okupacija u 26 slika	Serbo-Croatian	Lordan Zafranović	Not nominated
1979 (52nd)	The Man to Destroy	Čovjek koga treba ubiti	Serbo-Croatian	Veljko Bulajić	Not nominated
1980 (53rd)	Special Treatment	Посебан третман	Serbo-Croatian	Goran Paskaljević	Not nominated
1981 (54th)	Do You Remember Dolly Bell?	Sjećaš li se Dolly Bell?	Serbo-Croatian	Emir Kusturica	Not nominated
1982 (55th)	The Smell of Quinces	Miris dunja	Serbo-Croatian	Mirza Idrizović	Not nominated
1983 (56th)	Great Transport	Veliki transport	Serbo-Croatian	Veljko Bulajić	Not nominated
1984 (57th)	The End of the War	Крај рата	Serbo-Croatian	Dragan Kresoja	Not nominated
1985 (58th)	When Father Was Away on Business	Otac na službenom putu	Serbo-Croatian	Emir Kusturica	Nominated
1986 (59th)	Happy New Year '49	Среќна Нова '49	Macedonian, Serbo-Croatian	Stole Popov	Not nominated
1987 (60th)	Reflections	Već viđeno	Serbo-Croatian, Esperanto	Goran Marković	Not nominated
1988 (61st)	My Uncle's Legacy	Život sa stricem	Serbo-Croatian	Krsto Papić	Not nominated
1989 (62nd)	Time of the Gypsies	Dom za vešanje	Serbo-Croatian, Romani, Italian	Emir Kusturica	Not nominated
1990 (63rd)	Time of Miracles	Vreme čuda	Serbo-Croatian	Goran Paskaljević	Not nominated
1991 (64th)	The Original of the Forgery	Original falsifikata	Serbo-Croatian	Dragan Kresoja	Not nominated

== See also ==
- List of Bosnian submissions for the Academy Award for Best International Feature Film
- List of Croatian submissions for the Academy Award for Best International Feature Film
- List of Kosovan submissions for the Academy Award for Best International Feature Film
- List of Montenegrin submissions for the Academy Award for Best International Feature Film
- List of Macedonian submissions for the Academy Award for Best International Feature Film
- List of Serbian submissions for the Academy Award for Best International Feature Film
- List of Slovenian submissions for the Academy Award for Best International Feature Film
