= Kozara (film) =

- Directed by: Veljko Bulajić
- Written by: Stevan Bulajić; Veljko Bulajić; Ratko Đurović; Skender Kulenović; Berislav Orlović; Vladimir Špindler
- Starring: Bert Sotlar; Bata Živojinović; Milena Dravić; Olivera Marković; Dragomir Felba; Ljubiša Samardžić; Mihajlo Kostić; Milan Milosevic; Abdurrahman Shala; Davor Antolić
- Cinematography: Aleksandar Sekulović
- Edited by: Katarina Stojanović
- Music by: Vladimir Kraus-Rajterić
- Release date: August 2, 1962
- Running time: 124 minutes
- Country: Yugoslavia
- Language: Serbo-Croatian

Kozara is a 1962 Yugoslav film directed by Veljko Bulajić. It is a well known film of the partisan film subgenre popular in Yugoslavia in the 1960s and 1970s and depicts events surrounding the Battle of Kozara.

It won the Big Golden Arena for Best Film at the 1962 Pula Film Festival, the Yugoslav national film awards, was entered into the 3rd Moscow International Film Festival where it won a Golden Prize, and was selected as the Yugoslav entry for the Best Foreign Language Film at the 32nd Academy Awards, but was not accepted as a nominee.

== Cast ==
- Bert Sotlar as Vukša
- Velimir 'Bata' Živojinović as Sorga (as Bata Živojinović)
- Milena Dravić as Milja
- Olivera Marković as Anđa
- Dragomir Felba as Obrad
- Ljubiša Samardžić as Mitar
- Mihajlo Kostić Pljaka as Ahmet (as Mihajlo Kostić)
- Milan Milošević as Ivica
- Abdurrahman Shala as Jakov (as Abdurahman Šalja)
- Davor Antolić as Joja
- Tana Mascarelli as Marinko's mother (as Tana Maskareli)
- Tamara Miletić as Zlata
- Adam Vedernjak as Marinko

== See also ==
- List of submissions to the 36th Academy Awards for Best Foreign Language Film
- List of Yugoslav submissions for the Academy Award for Best Foreign Language Film
