= Battle of Neretva (film) =

1969 film directed by Veljko Bulajić

- US film poster
- Directed by: Veljko Bulajić
- Screenplay by: Ratko Djurović; Stevan Bulajić; Veljko Bulajić; Ugo Pirro; English Version: Alfred Hayes
- Story by: Stevan Bulajic; Ratko Djurovic
- Produced by: Steve Previn
- Starring: Yul Brynner; Sergei Bondarchuk; Curd Jürgens; Sylva Koscina; Hardy Krüger; Franco Nero; Orson Welles
- Cinematography: Tomislav Pinter
- Edited by: Vojislav Bjenjas
- Music by: Vladimir Kraus-Rajteric; English Version: Bernard Herrmann
- Color process: Eastmancolor
- Production companies: Beograd Film; Jadran Film; Kinema Sarajevo; Radna Zajednica Filma; Igor Film; Eichberg-Film; Commonwealth United Entertainment
- Distributed by: Beograd Film (Yugoslavia); International Film Company (Italy); Columbia Film-Verleih (West Germany); American International Pictures (US)
- Release date: 29 November 1969
- Running time: 175 minutes 126 minutes (English Version)
- Countries: Yugoslavia; Italy; West Germany; United States
- Languages: Serbo-Croatian; Italian; German; English
- Budget: $12 million

Battle of Neretva (Serbo-Croatian: Bitka na Neretvi, Битка на Неретви) is a 1969 Yugoslavian epic partisan film. Written by Stevan Bulajić and Veljko Bulajić, and directed by Veljko Bulajić, it is based on the true events of World War II. The Battle of the Neretva was due to a strategic plan for a combined Axis powers attack in 1943 against the Yugoslav Partisans. The plan was also known as the Fourth Enemy Offensive and occurred in the area of the Neretva river in Bosnia and Herzegovina.

Battle of Neretva is the most expensive motion picture made in the SFR Yugoslavia. It was nominated for the Academy Award for Best Foreign Language Film, the year after Sergei Bondarchuk (playing the role of Martin in Neretva) won the honour for War and Peace. The score for the English-speaking versions was composed by Bernard Herrmann. Its soundtrack was released by Entr'acte Recording Society in 1974. It was later re-released by Southern Cross Records on CD.

One of the original posters for the English version of the movie was made by Pablo Picasso, which, according to Bulajić, the famous painter agreed to do without monetary payment, only requesting a case of the best Yugoslav wines.

== Plot ==
The narrative unfolds against the backdrop of World War II in Yugoslavia, depicting the dynamics between German forces, Italian units, Chetniks (supporters of the Royal Yugoslav government), and Partisans (supporters of the People's Republic of Yugoslavia led by Tito).

The story begins with a German tank column advancing into Yugoslavia, while Partisan supporters march through the streets. Three siblings, Danica, Novak, and Vuko, are caught in the midst of the conflict. General Lohring briefs his commanders on battle plans, emphasizing the importance of attacking from the north.

The Partisans face fierce resistance, leading to retreat plans. They aim to cross the Neretva river to the east while rescuing the wounded and sick. Meanwhile, German and Italian forces intensify their attacks, leading to civilian casualties and refugee crises.

The narrative highlights the moral conflict within the Italian army, as Capitano Rossi questions their role as aggressors. Eventually, he defects to the Partisans. Battles ensue in Prozor and Jablanica, with successes and losses on both sides.

General Lohring seeks to annihilate the Partisans quickly, but they continue to evade capture. The destruction of the Neretva bridge bewilders the Germans, and they realise the Partisans are advancing north. Colonel Krenzer's division faces intense combat, while the Partisans prepare to encircle the Chetniks.

In a decisive battle at the old cemetery, many Partisans, including Danica and Novak, sacrifice their lives to encircle and force the surrender of the Chetniks. The Partisans retreat eastward, leaving heavy equipment behind. The journey is arduous, with many succumbing to exhaustion and illness along the way.

== Cast ==
- Sergei Bondarchuk as Martin
- Yul Brynner as Vlado (Vladimir Smirnov)
- Curt Jürgens as Gen. Lohring
- Bata Živojinović as Stole
- Sylva Koscina as Danica
- Boris Dvornik as Stipe
- Hardy Krüger as Col. Kranzer
- Franco Nero as Capt. Michele Riva
- Lojze Rozman as Ivan
- Ljubiša Samardžić as Novak
- Orson Welles as Chetnik senator
- Milena Dravić as Nada
- Špela Rozin as Vlado's aide
- Pavle Vuisić as Jordan
- Fabijan Šovagović as Mad Boško
- Anthony Dawson as Gen. Morelli
- Dušan Bulajić as Chetnik Commander
- Renato Rossini as Sgt. Mario
- Oleg Vidov as Nikola
- Kole Angelovski as Žika
- Stole Aranđelović as Šumadinac
- Demeter Bitenc as Capt. Schröder
- Ralph Persson as Lt. Horst
- Radko Polič as Vuko
- Miha Baloh as Ustasha Commander
- Faruk Begolli as Stevo
- Zaim Muzaferija as tall peasant in the Partisans column
- Hajrudin Hadžikarić as Vladimir Nazor

== Production ==
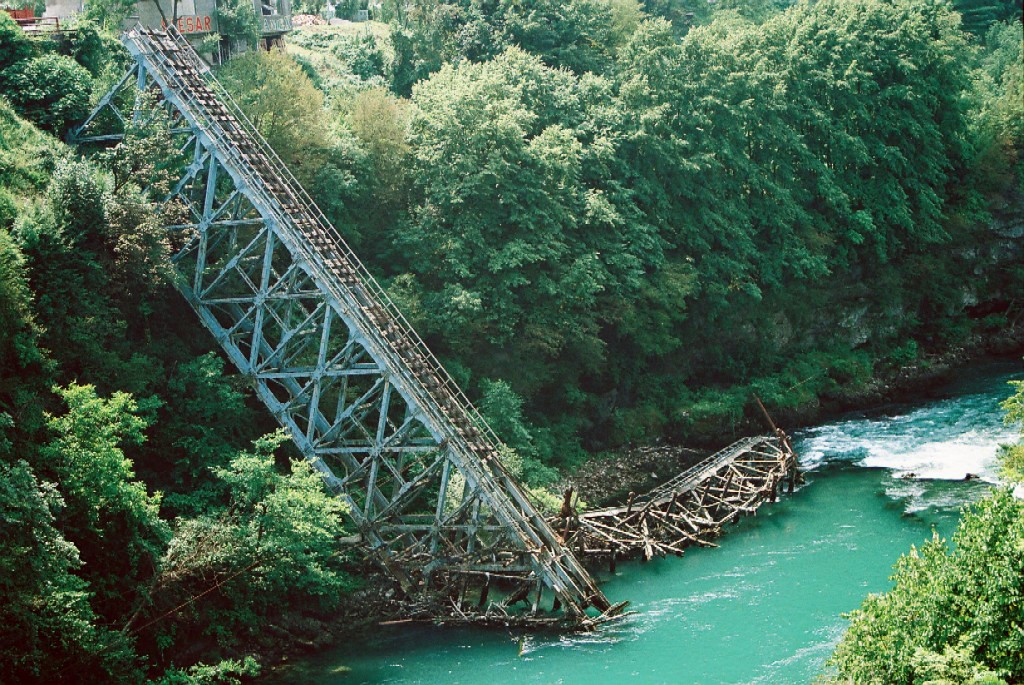
Bridge on the Neretva river, built and twice-destroyed during the shooting of the film.

Battle of Neretva was the first of a series of huge state-sponsored World War II film productions. It had a staggering budget approved by Yugoslav leader Josip Broz Tito. Different sources put it anywhere between $4.5 million and $12 million (equivalent to approximately $40.5 million and $109.5 million in 2026). Global stars such as Sergei Bondarchuk, Yul Brynner, Franco Nero, Orson Welles, etc. flocked to communist Yugoslavia attracted by the huge sums of money being offered.

Shot over 16 months with funds put up in largest part by over 58 self-managed companies in Yugoslavia, the movie featured a combined battalion of 10,000 Yugoslav People's Army (JNA) soldiers. Four villages and a fortress were constructed for the film and destroyed. Several JNA-inventory Soviet T-34 tanks, touched up to look like German Panzers, met the same fate. Even several Yugoslavian Soko 522 planes were used to represent german luftwaffe planes with Balkenkreuz painted on the wings.

A railway bridge over the Neretva in Jablanica was destroyed. However, the footage was not usable due to billowing smoke obscuring the scene. The bridge was repaired and destroyed for a second time, however the footage was again useless due to the smoke. Director Bulajić's had originally justified destroying the bridge rather than faking it on a studio set by saying the real location would become a tourist attraction; however, due to the problems with the smoke, the shot was ultimately achieved on a soundstage in Prague using a model. The Yugoslav public was updated on the shooting progress via pieces in the country's print media.

== Release ==
The film has been edited in to numerous versions. Runtimes vary by location, the regional prints also change the story due to edits that add or remove scenes:

- North America: 106 minutes
- Spanish: 113 minutes
- European: 127 minutes
- UK/Australia: 127 minutes
- Germany and Croatia: 142 minutes each, although they are not the same print.
- Serbia: 160 minutes

Most of the actors spoke their native language and subtitled in the original release. Afterwards the film was dubbed in English and distributed world-wide with subtitles for some scenes. The English dubbed versions, running between 106 and 127 minutes, were rescored by Bernard Hermann as the original film score by Vladmir Kraus Rajteric had been damaged in the redubbing process. However, the German and Croat-language releases contain the original score.

== Reception ==
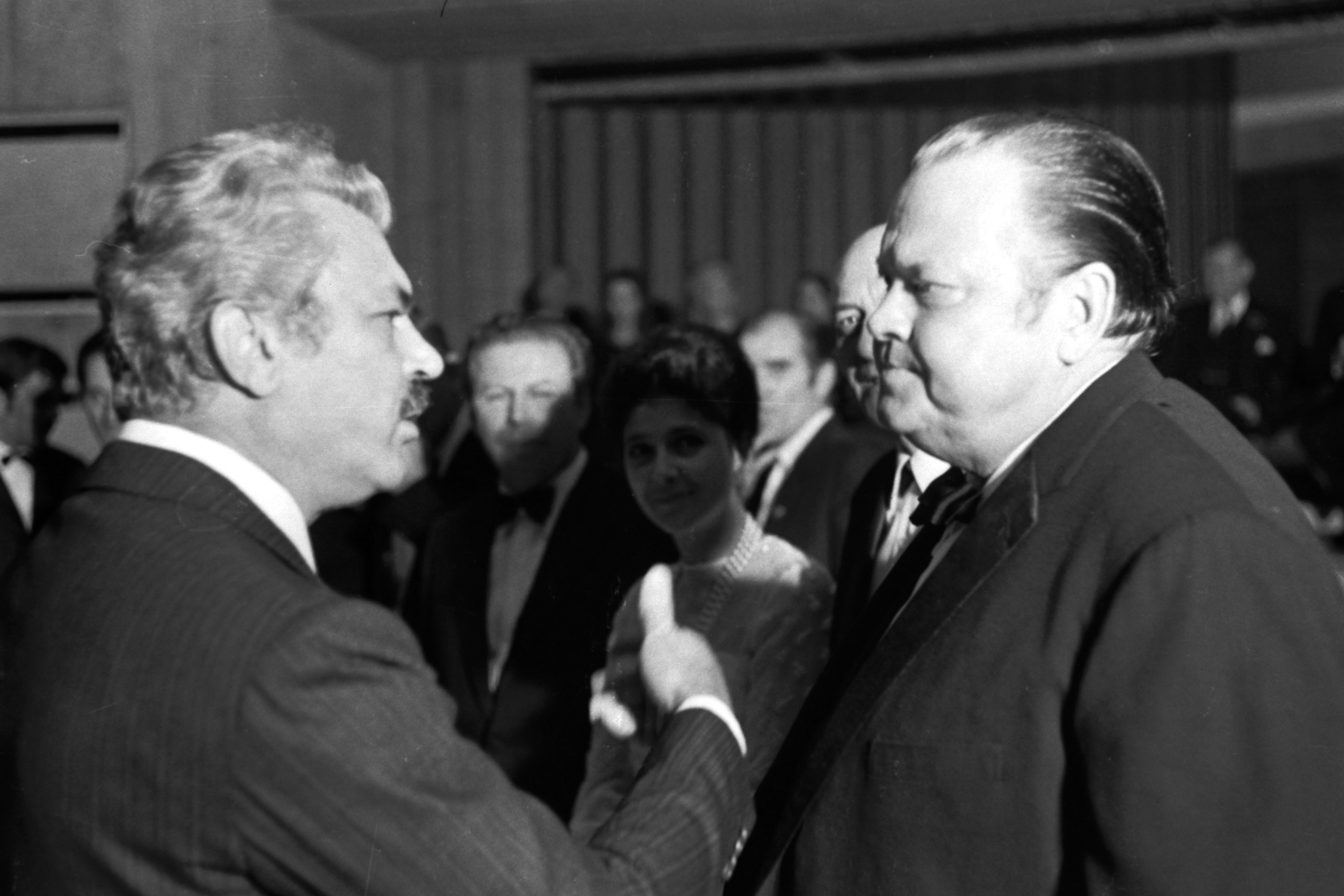
Sergei Bondarchuk and Orson Welles at the premiere in Sarajevo on 29 November 1969.

In 1999, a poll of Croatian film fans found it to be one of the best Yugoslavian films ever made.

== See also ==
- Force 10 from Navarone, a fictional account of part of the battle
- List of Yugoslav films
- List of most expensive non-English language films
- List of submissions to the 42nd Academy Awards for Best Foreign Language Film
- List of Yugoslav submissions for the Academy Award for Best Foreign Language Film
