= Oktoberfest (1987 film) =

1987 film

- Directed by: Dragan Kresoja
- Written by: Branko Dimitrijevic; Dragan Kresoja
- Produced by: Stevan Petrovic
- Starring: Svetislav Goncić
- Cinematography: Predrag Popovic
- Release date: July 1987
- Running time: 101 minutes
- Country: Yugoslavia
- Language: Serbo-Croatian

Oktoberfest is a 1987 Yugoslav drama film directed by Dragan Kresoja. It was entered into the 15th Moscow International Film Festival.

== Cast ==
- Svetislav Goncić as Luka Banjanin
- Zoran Cvijanović as Bane
- Žarko Laušević as Skobi
- Vladislava Milosavljević as Jasna
- Bata Živojinović as Skoblar
- Zeljka Cvjetan as Svetlana
- Goran Radaković as Dule
- Tatjana Pujin as Mala Irena
- Đurđija Cvetić as Skoblarova zena (as Djurdjija Cvijetic)
- Ružica Sokić as Luletova majka
- Petar Kralj as Luletov otac
- Bogdan Diklić as Vanja
- Vesna Trivalić as Buca
- Branislav Lečić as Lepi
- Srđan Todorović as Goran

== See also ==
- Yugoslav films of the 1980s
