= Doctor Homer's Brother =

- Serbo-Croatian: Brat doktora Homera
- Directed by: Živorad Mitrović
- Written by: Živorad Mitrović
- Produced by: Boško Mitrović
- Starring: Velimir Bata Živojinović; Voja Mirić; Jovan Milićević; Ljuba Tadić; Pavle Vuisić
- Cinematography: Branko Ivatović
- Edited by: Vojislav Bjenjaš
- Music by: Bojan Adamič
- Production company: FRZ Beograd
- Release date: 1968
- Running time: 84 min
- Country: Yugoslavia
- Language: Serbo-Croatian

Doctor Homer's Brother (Serbo-Croatian: Brat doktora Homera / Брат доктора Хомера) is a 1968 Yugoslav feature film written and directed by Živorad "Žika" Mitrović.

The film, which resembles some of Mitrović's earlier Partisan films, was strongly influenced by Hollywood westerns, as well as the then-popular Yugoslav Black Wave, as evident in its depiction of corrupt government officials in post-war Yugoslavia. The film's title song is performed by Arsen Dedić.

== Plot ==
The films takes place in 1945 in Kosovo, a few months after the end of the Second World War, the consequences of which are still evident in general poverty, typhus epidemics, but also the activities of the remnants of defeated Ballists who are hiding in the mountains. The protagonist Simon Petrović is a young man who returns to his hometown after spending four years in a German prison camp and is faced with the fact that his fiancée Vera has left him and married his brother Homer. Simon is even more affected by the fact that his father, a respected judge, was killed in suspicious circumstances, and although the culprit was found and caught for the crime, he decides to reveal the truth and finally take revenge on the perpetrators.

== Cast ==
- Velimir "Bata" Živojinović as Simon Petrović
- Voja Mirić as Doctor Homer
- Jovan Milićević as Captain Vuk
- Ljuba Tadić as monk
- Pavle Vuisić as Atanas
- Zdravka Krstulović as Ana
- Jelena Žigon as Vera
- Petre Prličko as doctor
- Stole Aranđelović as Kurteš
- Boris Beginov
- Faruk Begolli as peasant
- Istref Begoli
- Milan Bosiljčić Beli
- Darko Damevski as bandit
- Vukan Dinevski
- Panče Kamdžik
- Dragi Kostovski
- Todor Nikolovski
- Abdurahman Šalja as Major Fadilj
- Zlatibor Stoimirov
- Minja Vojvodić
- Janez Vrhovec as Pera Špricer
