= Zvonimir Črnko =

Croatian actor

- Born: 1 August 1936; Buševec, Yugoslavia
- Died: 25 January 2008 (aged 71); Zagreb, Croatia
- Occupation: Actor
- Years active: 1963-1985

Zvonimir Črnko (1 August 1936 – 25 January 2008) was a Croatian actor. He appeared in more than thirty films from 1963 to 1985.

== Filmography ==
Year	Title	Role	Notes
1965	The Oil Prince	Billy Forner	
1967	Crne ptice		
1968	Isadora	Essenin	
1970	The Fed One	Pjesnik	
1971	Makedonski del od pekolot	Sismanov	
1975	Doktor Mladen	Omer	
1975	Anno Domini 1573	Van Hovig	
1976	Private Vices, Public Pleasures		
1976	Attempted Flight	Borsalino	
1977	Operation Stadium	Lujo Verdar	
1978	Mannen i skuggan	Ramon	
1979	The Man to Destroy	Farfa odnosno Scepan Mali / car Petar III	
1980	Lost Homeland	Povratnik	
1982	Kiklop		
1985	The Red and the Black	Porucnik Garijo	
