= Dragan Kresoja =

- Born: 23 March 1946; Zagreb, SFR Yugoslavia
- Died: 6 November 1996 (aged 50); Belgrade, FR Yugoslavia
- Years active: 1983–1995

Dragan Kresoja (23 March 1946 – 6 November 1996) was a Serbian film director.

== Career ==
After working as an assistant director on a number of Yugoslav television and feature film productions throughout the 1970s he began directing in the early 1980s. Two of his films were Yugoslav submissions for the Academy Award for Best Foreign Language Film - The End of the War (1984) and The Original of the Forgery (1991). His 1987 film Oktoberfest was entered into the 15th Moscow International Film Festival.

== Filmography ==
- Još ovaj put (1983)
- The End of the War (Kraj rata, 1984)
- Oktoberfest (1987)
- The Original of the Forgery (Original falsifikata, 1991)
- Full Moon Over Belgrade (Pun mesec nad Beogradom, 1993)
- Tamna je noć (1995)
