= The Day That Shook the World =

- American poster of the movie
- Directed by: Veljko Bulajić
- Written by: Screenplay: Stevan Bulajić; Vladimír Bor; Paul Jarrico; Veljko Bulajić
- Produced by: Vlado Brankovic; Bohumil Pokorný
- Starring: Christopher Plummer; Florinda Bolkan; Maximilian Schell
- Cinematography: Jan Čuřík
- Edited by: Roger Dwyre
- Music by: Juan Carlos Calderón; Luboš Fišer
- Production companies: Jadran Film; Barrandov Studios; Kinema Sarajevo
- Distributed by: American International Pictures (USA)
- Release date: 31 October 1975
- Running time: 122 minutes
- Countries: Czechoslovakia; Yugoslavia; Germany
- Languages: Czech; Serbo-Croatian; English; German

The Day That Shook the World (Serbo-Croatian: Sarajevski atentat, lit. The Sarajevo Assassination) is a 1975 Czechoslovak-Yugoslav-German co-production film directed by Veljko Bulajić, starring Christopher Plummer and Florinda Bolkan. The film is about the assassination of Archduke Franz Ferdinand and his wife Sophie in Sarajevo in 1914 and the immediate aftermath that led to the outbreak of World War I.

When the only surviving heir to Emperor Franz Joseph of Austria-Hungary, Archduke Franz Ferdinand, was killed by Gavrilo Princip, a Yugoslav nationalist, on 28 June 1914, his death set in motion a chain of events that resulted in the First World War. The movie chronicles the events surrounding that death and its aftermath. The assassination gave the Germans and Austrians reason to fear that the Russian Empire was actively fomenting unrest in the Balkans, since Serbia was a bone of contention throughout the region.

== Cast ==
- Christopher Plummer as Archduke Franz Ferdinand
- Florinda Bolkan as Sophie, Duchess of Hohenberg
- Maximilian Schell as Đuro Šarac
- Irfan Mensur as Gavrilo Princip
- Radoš Bajić as Nedeljko Čabrinović
- Ivan Vyskočil as Mehmed Mehmedbašić
- Libuše Šafránková as Yelena
- Otomar Korbelář as Franz Joseph I of Austria
- Wilhelm Koch-Hooge as Franz Conrad
- Jiří Holý as Erich von Merizzi
- Nelly Gaierová as Countess Langus
- Jiří Kodet as Morsley

== Release ==
The film was released to cinemas on October 31, 1975. In addition to Yugoslavia, it was released to Bulgaria, West Germany, Hungary, Poland, Romania, USSR, Algeria, Lebanon, India, Nepal, Albania, and China. It was released to the United States two years later.

On January 6, 2011, it was released on DVD.

== Awards ==
The film won one award at the 1976 San Sebastián International Film Festival in the Special Mention category. The film was also selected as the Yugoslav entry for the Best Foreign Language Film at the 48th Academy Awards, but was not accepted as a nominee. The film also earned director Veljko Bulajic a Silver Arena award at the 1976 Yugoslav National Film Awards (today known as the Pula Film Festival).

== See also ==
- List of submissions to the 48th Academy Awards for Best Foreign Language Film
- List of Yugoslav submissions for the Academy Award for Best Foreign Language Film
