= The End of the War =

1984 film

The End of War
- Directed by: Dragan Kresoja
- Written by: Gordan Mihić
- Starring: Velimir 'Bata' Zivojinovic
- Cinematography: Predrag Popovic
- Release date: 9 July 1984
- Running time: 93 minutes
- Country: Yugoslavia
- Language: Serbian

The End of War (Serbian: Kraj rata, Крај рата) is a 1984 Yugoslav war film directed by Dragan Kresoja. The film was selected as the Yugoslav entry for the Best Foreign Language Film at the 57th Academy Awards, but was not accepted as a nominee.

== Plot ==
At the end of World War II, a Serbian man takes his son to find and kill five members of the Croatian Ustaše militia who tortured and killed his wife and mother.

== Cast ==
- Bata Živojinović as Bajo Lazarević
- Marko Ratić as Vukole Lazarević
- Gorica Popović as Milka Lazarević
- Neda Arnerić as Nadica Vukelić
- Aleksandar Berček as Bora Živaljević
- Radko Polič as Kristijan
- Miroljub Lešo as Jozo
- Bogdan Diklić as Alojzije Zadro
- Josif Tatić as Hasko
- Miloš Kandić as Vijuk
- Milivoje Tomić as Old Man

== See also ==
- List of submissions to the 57th Academy Awards for Best Foreign Language Film
- List of Yugoslav submissions for the Academy Award for Best Foreign Language Film
