= The Original of the Forgery =

1991 film

- Directed by: Dragan Kresoja
- Written by: Rade Radovanovic
- Starring: Lazar Ristovski
- Edited by: Andrija Zafranovic
- Release date: 1991
- Running time: 117 minutes
- Country: Yugoslavia
- Language: Serbia

The Original of the Forgery (Serbian: Original falsifikata) is a 1991 Yugoslav drama film directed by Dragan Kresoja. The film was selected as the final Yugoslav entry for the Best Foreign Language Film at the 64th Academy Awards, but was not accepted as a nominee.

== Cast ==
- Lazar Ristovski as Pavle
- Dragan Nikolic as Pavlovic
- Velimir 'Bata' Zivojinovic as Vujic (as Bata Zivojinovic)
- Snezana Bogdanovic as Lena
- Zarko Lausevic as Stojan
- Dusan Jakisic as Dragisa
- Ruzica Sokic as Mileva
- Nebojsa Bakocevic as Pavle Pavlovic

== See also ==
- List of submissions to the 64th Academy Awards for Best Foreign Language Film
- List of Yugoslav submissions for the Academy Award for Best Foreign Language Film
