= Žarko Laušević =

Serbian actor (1960–2023)

- Жарко Лаушевић
- Born: 19 January 1960; Cetinje, PR Montenegro, FPR Yugoslavia
- Died: 15 November 2023 (aged 63); Belgrade, Serbia
- Occupation: Actor
- Years active: 1978–2023

Žarko Laušević (Serbian Cyrillic: Жарко Лаушевић; Serbian pronunciation: [ʒǎːrkɔ lâuʃɛʋitɕ]; 19 January 1960 – 15 November 2023) was a Serbian actor. He became a leading actor early in his career. By the age of 33, he was a major star across the former Yugoslavia on both stage and screen.

== Early years ==
Žarko Laušević was born on 19 January 1960, in Cetinje, PR Montenegro, FPR Yugoslavia. He got his first TV role at the age of eighteen. In 1982, immediately upon graduating from the University of Belgrade’s Academy of Theatrical Arts, he was cast in his first lead film role. Throughout the 1980s and 1990s, he received mostly lead roles in 25 movies, 17 TV shows and numerous theatrical productions across Yugoslavia. During this period, he became one of Yugoslavia's most popular movie and theatrical actors. He won the 1987 Golden Arena award for the film Oficir s ružom (The Officer with a Rose).

== Shooting incident and legal troubles ==
In July 1993, Laušević entered into a quarrel with a group of local youths, together with his brother. This escalated into a fist fight, culminating in Laušević firing multiple rounds from his handgun, killing two of the youths and seriously wounding one. Sentenced by a Montenegrin (republic) court to prison initially, his conviction was overturned by the Yugoslav (appellate) court on the grounds that the first-instance court had improperly dismissed Laušević's self-defense argument, and the punishment was drastically reduced. Laušević served 4 years and 7 months in prison before his release. But he faced further legal battles. There were appeals by the Montenegrin prosecution, numerous retrials and inconsistent, ad hoc rulings by the Montenegrin court system. In 2001, the prison sentence was reinstated to 13 years by the Montenegrin courts.

In the late 1990s, Laušević left Yugoslavia for the United States. It is speculated that the move was made due to possible revenge by families of the deceased. He lived in the United States for two decades, returning to Serbia in 2014.

On 29 December 2011, Serbian president Boris Tadić gave Laušević amnesty from further charges regarding the 1993 double murder.

On 1 February 2012, Serbian deputy Prime Minister Ivica Dačić granted Laušević Serbian citizenship and passport.

== Death ==
Žarko Laušević died in hospital on 15 November 2023, at the age of 63.

== Filmography ==
- Volja sinovljeva (2024) as Nikola
- Ruski konzul (2024) as Ljuba Božović
- Vreme smrti (2024) as Živojin Mišić
- Heroji Hilijarda (2023) as Kosta Jović
- How I Learned to Fly (2022) as Nikola
- Princ Rastko Srpski (2018) as Stefan Nemanja
- Volja sinovljeva (2018) as Nikola
- Smrdljiva bajka (2015) as Moma
- The Dagger (1999) as Alija Osmanović / Ilija Jugović
- Ranjena zemlja (1999)
- Rođen kao ratnik (1994) as Gibon
- Kaži zašto me ostavi (1993) as Peđa
- Better Than Escape (Bolje od bekstva) (1993)
- The Black Bomber (1992) as Šmajser
- The Original of the Forgery (1991) as Stojan
- Stela (1990) as Mato Herceg
- Početni udarac (1990)
- Atoski vrtovi - preobraženje (1989) as Sava slikar
- Battle of Kosovo (1989) as Miloš Obilić
- Braća po materi (1988) as Braco Gavran
- El Camino del sur (1988) as Moritz
- Oktoberfest (1987) as Skobi
- Dogodilo se na današnji dan (1987) as Bajra
- Oficir s ružom (1987) as Petar Horvat
- The Beauty of Vice (1986) as young man with a cigarette
- Sivi Dom (1986) as Šilja
- Dobrovoljci (1986) as Sportista
- Šmeker (1986) as Šmeker
- Jagode u grlu (1985) as Lale
- Lazar (1984) as Lazar
- Igmanski marš (1983) as Miljan
- Savamala (1982) as Vinko Sarić
- 13. jul (1982) as Janko 'Kvisling'
- Progon (1982) as Mirko
- Direktan prenos (1982) as Fantom
