= Train Without a Timetable =

1959 film

- Directed by: Veljko Bulajić
- Written by: Ivo Braut; Veljko Bulajić
- Starring: Stole Aranđelović
- Cinematography: Kreso Grcevic
- Edited by: Blazenka Jencik
- Release date: 14 March 1959
- Running time: 121 minutes
- Country: FPR Yugoslavia
- Language: Serbo-Croatian

Train Without a Timetable (Serbo-Croatian: Vlak bez voznog reda) is a 1959 Yugoslav film directed by Veljko Bulajić. It was entered into the 1959 Cannes Film Festival. The film was also selected as the Yugoslav entry for the Best Foreign Language Film at the 32nd Academy Awards, but was not accepted as a nominee.

The film was a complex drama dealing with the interactions among people who were forcefully leaving their ancestral homes in order to move to new, yet undeveloped farmland. His debut was a major success earning him four awards at the Yugoslav National Film Awards (now known as the Pula Film Festival), an award from the city of Zagreb and the best debut film award at the Cannes Film Festival.

== Cast ==
- Stole Aranđelović as Lovre
- Inge Ilin
- Olivera Marković as Ike
- Tana Mascarelli as Jole's wife
- Milan Milosevic
- Ivica Pajer
- Lia Rho-Barbieri
- Vjera Simić (as Vera Simić)
- Teddy Stotsek (as Tedy Sotosek)
- Zdenka Trach (as Zdenka Trah)
- Ljiljana Vajler
- Kruno Valentić as policeman
- Krešimir Zidarić
- Velimir Živojinović as Duje

== See also ==
- List of submissions to the 32nd Academy Awards for Best Foreign Language Film
- List of Yugoslav submissions for the Academy Award for Best Foreign Language Film
