= High Voltage (1981 film) =

1981 Croatian film by Veljko Bulajić

- Directed by: Veljko Bulajić
- Release date: 1981
- Running time: 103 minutes
- Country: Croatia

High Voltage (Visoki napon) is a Croatian film directed by Veljko Bulajić. It was released in 1981.

== Cast ==
- Bozidarka Frajt as Sonja Kacar
- Vanja Drach as Direktor
- Milan Strljic as Stjepan
- Ljubisa Samardzic as Ivo Goreta
