= Jadran Film =

Croatian film production and distribution company

Jadran Film d.d.
- Company type: Public company
- Industry: Film production
- Founded: September 10, 1946; 79 years ago
- Founder: Government of the Republic of Croatia
- Headquarters: Zagreb, Croatia
- Key people: Vinko Grubišić (President of the Management Board)
- Products: Feature films, television productions, film production services
- Services: Film production, co-production, studio facilities, post-production
- Owner: Private shareholders
- Website: www.jadran-film.com

Jadran Film is a film production studio and distribution company founded in 1946 in Zagreb, Croatia. In the period between the early 1960s and late 1980s Jadran Film was one of the biggest and most notable film studios in Central Europe, with some 145 international and around 120 Yugoslav productions filmed at the studio during those three decades, including Oscar-winning films; Orson Welles' 1962 screen adaptation of Franz Kafka's novel The Trial and Sophie's Choice (1982) starring Meryl Streep. The word Jadran refers to the Adriatic Sea in Croatian.

During most of its existence it was one of the two main film studios in Yugoslav cinema (along with Avala Film of Belgrade) and was one of the few film companies which played a major role in the post-World War II history of Croatian cinema, along with Croatia Film and Zagreb Film (which is mainly known for animated films).

In the 1990s the company experienced a sharp downturn amid the breakup of Yugoslavia and most of the company's property was either sold or fell into disrepair in the ensuing privatization. The company still continues to produce films, although Jadran Film's once voluminous output has since dwindled to only a handful of films produced every year, mainly Croatian and regional co-productions.

== History ==
Jadran Film was founded in 1946 and produced their first film the following year, Nikola Popović's 1947 Yugoslav feature This People Must Live (Serbo-Croatian: Živjeće ovaj narod). The film set owned by Jadran Film located in the Dubrava neighborhood of Zagreb was soon separated into an independent company named Dubrava Film (which was later re-incorporated into Jadran Film in 1962). Jadran Film's most successful period came during the directorship of Sulejman Kapić, whose long-time assistant was producer Branko Lustig.

Between the 1960s and 1990s Jadran Film was one of the biggest and well-known film studios in Central Europe, and some 124 Yugoslav feature films and 145 international co-productions were filmed at the studio during those three decades. The first international productions filmed at the studio were Italian-produced Biblical B movies in the late 1950s, most notably the 1960 release David and Goliath which starred Orson Welles as King Saul and Ivica Pajer as David.

Jadran Film benefited from these early co-productions as Italian producers helped the company establish a number of auxiliary departments which provided stunts, horses, set construction and extras for large-scale historical films which were popular at the time, so Jadran Film studios soon began to be used routinely for filming scenes depicting Ancient Rome, Viking villages, Jerusalem or Wild West. Another advantage which Jadran Film had been that local hotels were considerably cheaper compared to elsewhere in Europe, so Zagreb became a preferred choice for foreign productions employing large film crews.

The Yugoslav-German-produced screen adaptations of the Winnetou book series set in the Wild West were one of the most well-known productions made at Jadran Film. The series, consisting of 11 films shot between 1962 and 1968 on locations in the Paklenica river canyon and at Grobnik near Rijeka, were very popular in Germany at the time and are considered predecessors of the Spaghetti Western genre. Episodes of several 1980s American TV series were also filmed in Zagreb by Jadran Film crews, including Winds of War, The Dirty Dozen and War and Remembrance.

Jadran Film also had a hand in two Oscar-winning films - Alan J. Pakula's 1982 drama Sophie's Choice (starring Meryl Streep) and the German film The Tin Drum (directed by Volker Schlöndorff, winner of the 1979 Academy Award for Best Foreign Language Film) were both in part filmed in Zagreb. Another notable film co-produced by Jadran Film was Orson Welles' 1962 screen adaptation of Franz Kafka's novel The Trial which was shot on location in Zagreb and starred Anthony Perkins, Jeanne Moreau and Romy Schneider. Then, in 1983, British Producer Fuad Kavur brought to Jadran Memed, My Hawk, because the filming of it had been banned in Turkey where the original novel takes place. Memed My Hawk starred Peter Ustinov who also directed the film.

In the early 1990s, amid the fall of communism, breakup of Yugoslavia, and the ensuing Croatian War of Independence, Jadran Film lost most of the advantages it offered, and foreign film productions began to shift towards other post-communist countries which could offer experienced film technicians and comparatively cheaper locations to Western productions. Jadran Film experienced a downfall, the number of employees shrank from 300 to 80 and film equipment and sets owned by the company fell into disrepair as maintenance work effectively ceased. In addition, the privatization of the once state-owned company also contributed to Jadran Film's problems.

The huge plot of land in Dubrava in the eastern part of Zagreb which was once used to build film sets was sold in the 1990s and turned into a shopping mall. The circumstances of the deal were described by the media as shady. In the late 1990s and well into the 2000s, Jadran Film continued to disintegrate, and it effectively lost the ability to support large co-productions which were once the staple of their film-making business. However, the company survived and continued to produce films, although their output had dwindled to only a handful of Croatian films every year with limited international appeal.

== Notable films ==
=== International co-productions ===
- The Trial (1962, directed by Orson Welles)
- The Ravine (1968, directed by Paolo Cavara)
- The Day That Shook the World (1975, directed by Veljko Bulajić)
- The Tin Drum (1979, directed by Volker Schlöndorff)
- Sophie's Choice (1982, directed by Alan J. Pakula)
- Memed, My Hawk (1983, directed by Peter Ustinov)
- Armour of God (1986, directed by Jackie Chan)
- The Pope Must Die (1991, directed by Peter Richardson)
- Death Train (1993, TV movie, directed by David Jackson)
- Grbavica (2006, directed by Jasmila Žbanić)
- The Hunting Party (2007, directed by Richard Shepard)

=== Big Golden Arena winners ===
Below is the complete list of films produced by Jadran Film which won the Golden Arena for Best Film, the main award at the Pula Film Festival. The festival served as the Yugoslav national film awards (i.e. the local equivalent of the Academy Award) since its establishment in 1955 until 1990. Due to the breakup of Yugoslavia in the early 1990s, the festival was re-branded as the Croatian film awards in 1992. A total of 11 Jadran Film films won the award in Yugoslav competition, and another two won the award since 1992.

Year	Film	Director	Notes
1958	H-8	Nikola Tanhofer	
1959	Train Without a Timetable	Veljko Bulajić	Yugoslav submission for the 32nd Academy Awards
1960	The Ninth Circle	France Štiglic	Yugoslav submission for the 33rd Academy Awards
1963	Face to Face	Branko Bauer	
1965	Prometheus of the Island	Vatroslav Mimica	
1966	Monday or Tuesday	Vatroslav Mimica	
1970	Handcuffs	Krsto Papić	
1975	The House	Bogdan Žižić	
1977	Don't Lean Out the Window	Bogdan Žižić	
1978	Occupation in 26 Pictures	Lordan Zafranović	Yugoslav submission for the 51st Academy Awards
1981	The Fall of Italy	Lordan Zafranović	
1995	Washed Out	Zrinko Ogresta	Croatian submission for the 68th Academy Awards
1999	When the Dead Start Singing	Krsto Papić	

== See also ==
- Cinema of Croatia
- Cinema of Yugoslavia
