= The Man to Destroy =

- Directed by: Veljko Bulajić
- Written by: Veljko Bulajić
- Starring: Zvonimir Črnko
- Release date: 29 March 1979
- Running time: 105 minutes
- Country: Yugoslavia
- Language: Serbo-Croatian

The Man to Destroy (Serbo-Croatian: Čovjek koga treba ubiti) is a 1979 Yugoslav historical-fantasy film directed by Veljko Bulajić, made in Croatian-Montenegrin coproduction. The film was selected as the Yugoslav entry for the Best Foreign Language Film at the 52nd Academy Awards, but was not accepted as a nominee.

The film won grand prix at the Sitges Film Festival in 1980, while Bulajić was awarded for best direction at the Paris International Festival of Fantastic and Science-Fiction Film. It also won ESFS Award, and was awarded by European Science Fiction Society at Eurocon 1980, as best film of the year (tie-in with Luigi Cozzi's Starcrash).

== Cast ==
- Zvonimir Črnko as Farfa odnosno Scepan Mali / car Petar III
- Vladimir Popović as Kapetan Tanovic
- Charles Millot as Agent prvog reda
- Ranko Kovačević as Djakon
- Tanja Bošković as Elfa
- Dušica Žegarac as Justina
- Tanasije Uzunović as Vrhovni sotona
- Mate Ergović as Stanko Palikarda, Elfin otac
- Zuzana Kocúriková as Zefira, bludnica
- Danilo Radulović
- Antun Nalis
- Ivica Pajer as Ruski Knez
- Ivo Vukcevic
- Veljko Mandic as Crnogorac

== See also ==
- List of submissions to the 52nd Academy Awards for Best Foreign Language Film
- List of Yugoslav submissions for the Academy Award for Best Foreign Language Film
