= The Promised Land (1986 film) =

Yugoslav film by Veljko Bulajić

The Promised Land (Serbo-Croatian: Obećana zemlja / Обећана земља) is a Yugoslav film directed by Veljko Bulajić. It was released in 1986.
