= Veljko Bulajić =

Croatian film director (1928–2024)

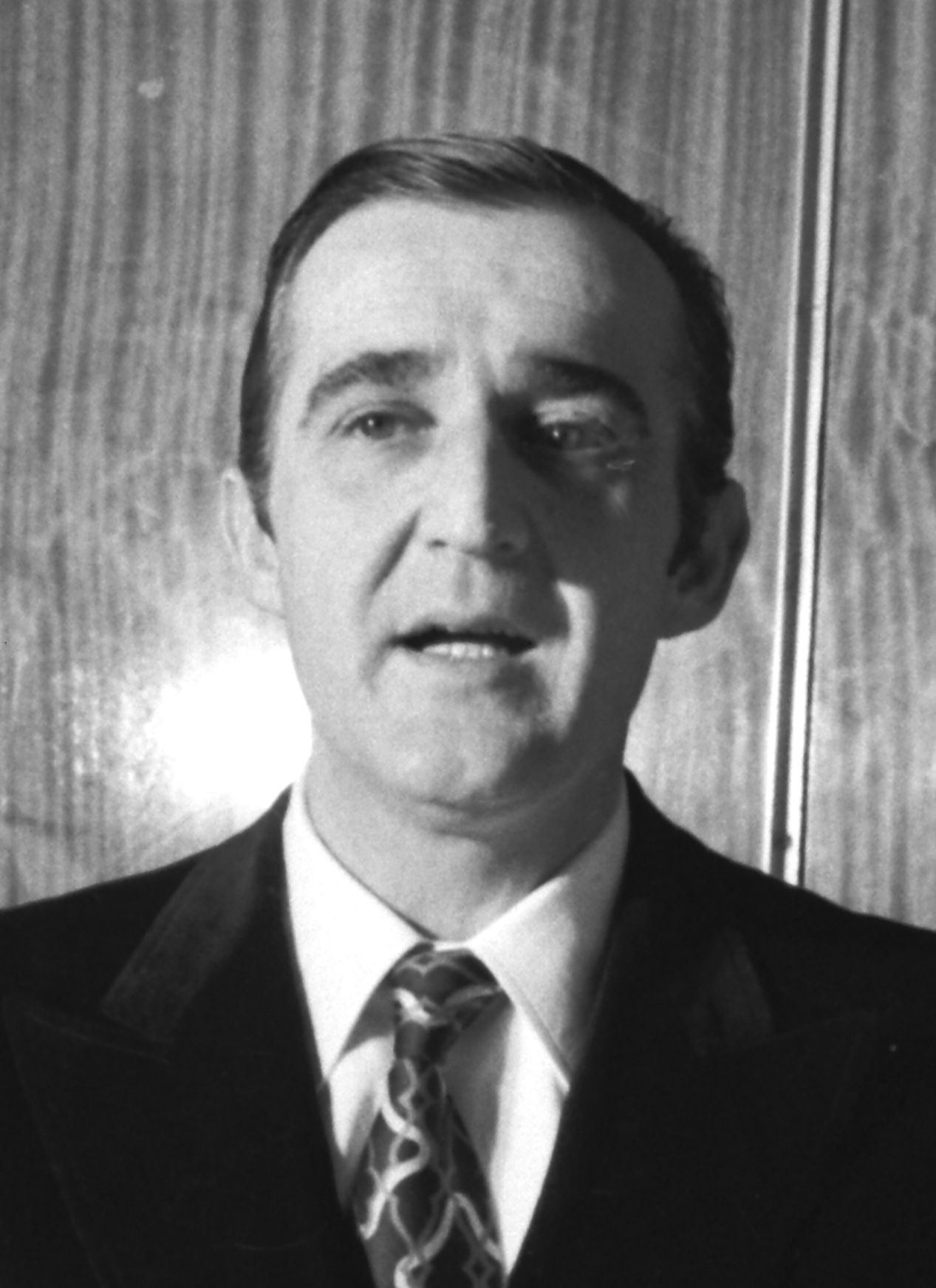
- Bulajić in 1969
- Born: 22 March 1928; Vilusi, Kingdom of Serbs, Croats and Slovenes
- Died: 2 April 2024 (aged 96); Zagreb, Croatia
- Education: Centro Sperimentale di Cinematografia
- Occupation: Film director
- Years active: 1953–2024
- Notable work: Vlak bez voznog reda Kozara; Bitka na Neretvi; Veliki transport
- Spouse: Vlasta Bulajić
- Awards: Order of Danica Hrvatska

Veljko Bulajić (22 March 1928 – 2 April 2024) was a Montenegrin and Croatian film director. Bulajić is a UNESCO Kalinga Prize recipient. He spent the majority of his life working in Croatia and is primarily known for directing World War II-themed movies from the Partisan film genre. According to the Croatian Public Broadcasting Company, his films have reached an audience of over 500 million viewers worldwide. The top four most viewed Yugoslav films of all time were all directed by Bulajić. MUBI streaming service describes Bulajić as "a creator of made-to-order epic blockbusters".

== Early life ==
Bulajić was born in the village of Vilusi near Nikšić, Kingdom of Serbs, Croats and Slovenes. He was a resistance fighter in World War II having joined the Yugoslav Partisans group at the age of 15. Bulajić and his two older brothers were all wounded in battle and at one point his entire family was imprisoned in an Italian fascist concentration camp. In a 2015 interview for a Chinese news website, Bulajić shared a story of how his "older brother was at the railway station in Montenegro when the allies of Italy-fascism switched trains to the Neretva River. My brother called them traitors and one of them shot him, severely wounding him and he died later".

The two surviving brothers, Veljko and Stevan, would later co-write the movies Kozara and Battle of Neretva.

After World War II, Bulajić was stationed at the Yugoslav People's Army base in Zagreb. This is where Bulajić found his passion for film which led him to pursue studies at the Italian Centro Sperimentale di Cinematografia under the tutelage of Cesare Zavattini. He then worked as an assistant to Italian film legends Federico Fellini, Giuseppe de Santis, Mario Soldati, Luigi Zampa and Vittorio De Sica before returning to Yugoslavia. It was during his time in Rome that Veljko befriended Sophia Loren and Carlo Ponti, both of whom would visit him many years later for holidays in both Croatia and Montenegro.

== Career ==
Bulajić first produced two short films, before making his debut feature film Train Without a Timetable. The film was a complex drama dealing with the interactions among people who were forcefully leaving their ancestral homes to move to new, yet undeveloped farmland. His debut was a major success earning him entry into the Cannes Film Festival and consideration for one of the world's most prestigious film prizes, the Palme d'Or. The film also earned him four awards at the Yugoslav National Film Awards (now known as the Pula Film Festival) and an award from the city of Zagreb. His next two films, Atomic War Bride and Boom Town were also awarded several Gold and Silver awards in various categories at the Yugoslav National Film Awards. Atomic War Bride was also nominated for a Golden Lion at the 1960 Venice Film Festival, making it Bulajic's second nomination for one of the "Big Three" international film festival prizes (Venice Golden Lion, Cannes Palme d'Or and Berlin Golden Bear).

In 1962 his film Kozara brought him international attention as he again won a Big Golden Arena for Best Film at the Yugoslav National Film Awards and the film premiered in the world's largest museum, the French Louvre. It was entered into the 3rd Moscow International Film Festival where it won the Golden Prize. Bulajić was a member of the jury at the 4th Moscow International Film Festival. The film was also shown at the San Francisco International Film Festival.

In 1969 he wrote and directed the legendary war film Battle of Neretva starring Orson Welles and Yul Brynner. The film has been viewed by more than 350 million people worldwide and is on the List of most expensive non-English language films. Pablo Picasso created one of the promotional posters for the film, one of only two movie posters that the Spanish artist ever created. Instead of a payment, Picasso and Bulajić agreed that Bulajić would provide Picasso with a case of Yugoslav wine. The two had met at the Monte Carlo Television Festival several years before Neretva when, as described below, Bulajic took home the Golden Nymph Award for his Skoplje '63 documentary about the devastating earthquake in the Macedonian capital. Picasso had decided to attend the festival after being shown a sneak preview of the film by Marcel Achard. The soundtrack for Neretva was created by Oscar-winning composer Bernard Herrmann and the film was nominated for the Academy Award for Best Foreign Language Film. President Josip Broz Tito and First Lady Jovanka Broz, Omar Sharif and Sophia Loren attended the premiere of the film in Sarajevo. Then-Governor of California and future U.S. President Ronald Reagan attended the U.S. premiere. In a 2020 interview, Bulajic stated that Reagan told him in private at a Beverly Hills gathering that he (Reagan) can't stand Orson Welles but that he agrees that Welles is a very good actor.

On 16 January 2018 the government of the Republic of Slovenia made a formal request to the Republic of Serbia requesting that the original copies of the film be delivered to Slovenia and officially recognized as part of its national cultural heritage. Bulajic responded through the Croatian media that neither the Slovenes nor the Serbs have a right to the film as it was a Croatian production. At the time that the film was released, all three countries were part of Yugoslavia.

In a 2014 interview, Bulajić attributed Neretva's success to its unconventional plot which only includes 15 minutes of shooting and battles while the rest is dedicated to the story of how the wounded were saved and cared for.

The premiere of Bulajić's film The Day That Shook the World was personally organized by Italy's First Lady, Vittoria Leone. The movie starred Hollywood actors Christopher Plummer, Maximillian Schell and Florinda Bolkan.

In 2017, Bulajić began filming what is believed to be his last feature-length film. The movie, Escape to the Sea, stars Game of Thrones actor Tom Wlaschiha as a German soldier lost behind enemy lines in World War II.

In November 2020, Bulajić's film Skoplje '63 was included on a list of the Top 10 Croatian documentary films of all time, according to a group of 38 film critics.

== Monograph ==
A 435 page monograph of Bulajić's career was published in 2015. The monograph was compiled by Božo Rudez (father of former NBA player Damjan Rudež) and it was presented to the public by the Croatian Minister of Culture Berislav Šipuš. 35 Croatian and 48 international authors contributed to the monograph, which includes pictures of all of Bulajic's actors and descriptions of Bulajic's artistic skills written by Orson Welles, François Truffaut, Andrzej Wajda, Carlo Ponti, Sergei Bondarchuk, Miroslav Krleža, Alberto Moravia and many others. The monograph also includes reviews of Bulajic's films by The New York Times, Le Monde, The Times, Cinema, La Voz de España and other newspapers.

== Humanitarian activities ==
Bulajić was one of 141 prominent Croatians who participated in the Libertas convoy grassroots humanitarian action aimed at breaking the naval blockade imposed by the Yugoslav Navy on the Croatian city of Dubrovnik in 1991. The naval blockade had led to a massive shortage of food, medicines and other necessities in the city. Stjepan Mesić who was the former Secretary-General of the Non-Aligned Movement and who at the time held the title of President of the Presidency of Yugoslavia was also aboard the ship. Mesic would later go on to serve two terms as President of Croatia. Also aboard was Croatian Prime Minister Franjo Gregurić. After an hours-long standoff with the navy, their ship, Slavija, successfully broke the blockade in late November 1991 and delivered the desperately needed supplies to the city's residents as well as refugees from surrounding areas.

At a 2010 remembrance meeting organized by Croatian Prime Minister Jadranka Kosor, Bulajić stated that the convoy was, at the time, one of the most positive global initiatives.

== Politics ==
Although often regarded as the go-to director of SFRY President Josip Broz Tito, Bulajić has been quoted as having mixed views on Tito's legacy both praising his anti-fascist leadership during World War II and his ability to stand up to Joseph Stalin in the Tito–Stalin split of 1948, but also criticizing him for his collectivist policies and the use of political prisons. Bulajić's older brother Stevan Bulajić, who was also a prominent screenwriter and intellectual, was imprisoned at the Goli Otok detention facility after publishing an opinion-editorial criticizing the ruling communist elite for shopping at the diplomatic stores which carried products that were off-limits to the overwhelming majority of the population.

In the late 1990s Bulajić demanded a government inquiry into the misuse of funds allocated to support a film he was writing and directing on the topic of the siege of Sarajevo. Bulajic initially voiced concerns about missing funds directly to the production company and only went public after he did not receive a response. Bulajic alluded to the fact that the son of NATO Supreme Allied Commander Europe and U.S. four-star General Wesley Clark, Wesley Clark Jr., was potentially involved in the misappropriation of the funds. Clarke had been appointed executive co-producer despite having no film credentials. After he went public with his accusations, Bulajic was fired. A local magazine later claimed to be in possession of documents showing suspicious bank transfers to Clarke's account.

In 2018, Bulajić spoke at the official launch of Milo Đukanović's presidential election campaign. At the event, Bulajić was seated next to Montenegrin Prime Minister Duško Marković who also voiced his strong support for Đukanović. Đukanović went on to win the election on 15 April 2018. It was Đukanović's second win as he had already served as President of Montenegro in the late 1990s.

Eighteen years earlier, Bulajić had accompanied then-Croatian President Stjepan Mesić on his historic visit to meet then-President Đukanović (who was at the time serving his first term in office). The meeting of the presidents was seen as a turning point in the bilateral relations between the two neighboring nations. Bulajić was an active supporter of Croatia's quest for independence, and later for Montenegro's quest for independence and NATO membership. In a 2019 interview, he was quoted as saying that Montenegro's entry into NATO was "the most important date in Montenegro's history".

In another 2019 interview, Bulajić stated that anti-fascism is under threat in Europe, and that the nationalist movements across the continent are reminiscent of the 1930s.

Also in 2019, Bulajić was a signatory to a public appeal urging the international community to condemn the Serbian "political, religious and media campaign" aimed at destabilizing peace and stability in neighboring Montenegro. Other signatories included former Croatian President Stjepan Mesić, former Yugoslav Foreign Minister and ambassador to the U.S., Germany and Indonesia Budimir Lončar, former President of Slovenia Milan Kučan, former Secretary of the Central Committee of the League of Communists of Serbia Latinka Perovic, former Member of the Presidency of Yugoslavia for SR Bosnia and Herzegovina Bogić Bogićević, Croatian Ambassador to UNESCO & Bet Israel founder Ivo Goldstein, and others.

== Death ==
Bulajić died on 2 April 2024, at the age of 96. His funeral was attended by hundreds of mourners including the former President of Montenegro Milo Dukanovic, the former President of the Croatian Parliament Luka Bebic, the former President of Croatia Stipe Mesic, the Mayor of Zagreb Tomislav Tomasevic and many other notable individuals from Croatia and the broader Balkan region. Bulajić's final resting place is in the Alley of the Greats at Mirogoj Cemetery where he is buried across from former NBA star Drazen Petrovic and next to Croatia's former football coach Ciro Blazevic.

== Awards and recognition ==
Arguably Bulajić's greatest recognition came when the Director-General of the United Nations Educational, Scientific and Cultural Organization (UNESCO) awarded him the prestigious Kalinga Prize for the most meaningful global artistic film contribution of the year. The award was in recognition of his documentary film Skoplje '63 about the massive earthquake that destroyed the city in 1963. The film also earned Bulajić his third nomination (and only win) at one of the "Big Three" film festivals. He took home the Golden Lion at the 25th Venice International Film Festival. In addition, the film earned Bulajić various other awards including the Cannes Film Festival film critics award, the Golden Spike at the Seminci Film Festival (also known as the Valladolid International Film Festival), an award at the Edinburgh International Film Festival., the Golden Nymph at the Monte Carlo Television Festival, and the CIDALC award from the International Committee for the Diffusion of Artistic and Literary Works by the Cinematograph. The Swedish Film Institute listed it as one of the 15 best films made between 1920 and 1964.

In 2012, the International League of Humanists recognized Bulajić as the humanists film director of the 20th century. The recognition was bestowed on Bulajic during Elizabeth Rehn's presidency of the international league.

Bulajić earned best director or best film awards at the Sitges Film Festival in Catalonia, Cairo Film Festival, Vancouver Film Festival, Saint Petersburg International Film Festival, Florence Film Festival, Avelin Film Festival, Cuneu Film Festival, Dok Leipzig film festival, San Sebastian International Film Festival and the International Film Festival of India (formerly known as the New Delhi Film Festival).

In 2008, the Manaki brothers International Film Festival awarded him a Special Award Golden Camera 300 for his contributions to world cinema.

In 2010, the Commission of the 32nd Moscow International Film Festival included Battle of Neretva in its list of the 10 most important films ever made about World War II. This put the film in the company of masterpieces such as The Bridge on the River Kwai by David Lean and Empire of the Sun by Steven Spielberg.

Throughout his career, Bulajić worked with a number of Hollywood stars including Orson Welles, Hardy Krüger, Sergei Bondarchuk, Franco Nero, Christopher Plummer and Yul Brynner.

Bulajić's other notable awards include ten golden arena awards at the Pula Film Festival, the audience award at the Cannes Film Festival, a lifetime achievement award at the MedFilm Festival and Europe's oldest film prize – the Nastro d'Argento awarded by the Italian National Syndicate of Film Journalists.

Bulajić served on the Cannes Film Festival jury in 1968, 1969 and 1980. He is one of only 15 people all-time to have served on the jury three or more times. Bulajic has also served on the juries of the Venice Film Festival, San Sebastian Film Festival and Delhi International Film Festival. In a 2011 article the American political-journalism organization Politico referred to Bulajic as "one of the most successful director's of his day".

In 2016 he was recognized with a SEE Film Legend Award by the International Committee of the South East European Film Festival.

Bulajić was recognized with several state awards and medals. These include the city of Berlin award, The Award of the Anti-Fascist Council for the National Liberation of Yugoslavia (which was the highest state award given to civilians in the Socialist Federal Republic of Yugoslavia) the "Sacred Ground of Stalingrad" award of the Soviet Union, the 13 July Lifetime Achievement award (the highest civilian honor in Montenegro), the City of Skopje (Macedonia) Award, the City of Zagreb (Croatia) Award, and the Vladimir Nazor Award for Life Achievement in Film awarded by the Republic of Croatia for outstanding contributions to the arts and culture.

In 2022, the President of Montenegro awarded the Order of the Montenegrin flag of the First Class to Bulajić in recognition of his film achievements and for his promotion of human and civilizational values, including raising his voice for a multi-ethnic, modern and anti-fascist Montenegro during the breakup of Yugoslavia.

== Selected filmography ==
- Train Without a Timetable (1959)
- Atomic War Bride (1960)
- Kozara (1962)
- Skoplje '63 (1964)
- Looking Into the Eyes of the Sun (1966)
- Battle of Neretva (1969)
- The Day That Shook the World (1975)
- The Man to Destroy (1979)
- High Voltage (1981)
- Great Transport (1983)
- The Promised Land (1986)
- Donator (1989)
- Libertas (2006)
