= Slobodan Pavićević =

Serbian production designer

- Born: 28 August 1945; Belgrade, Socialist Federal Republic of Yugoslavia
- Occupation(s): Production manager Film producer
- Years active: 1976-present
- Children: 2

Slobodan "Pava" Pavićević (Serbian Cyrillic: Слободан Павићевић; 28 August 1945), is a Serbian production manager and producer. He graduated from Faculty of Dramatic Arts, University of Arts in Belgrade. Pavićević worked with renown film directors such as Theo Angelopoulos, Ermanno Olmi, Goran Marković and he also served as the director of FEST.

== Selected filmography ==
- Lokalni vampir (2011)
- Kako su me ukrali Nemci (2011)
- Turneja (2008)
- Četvrti čovek (2007)
- Lavirint (2002)
- Belo odelo (1999)
- Cabaret Balkan (1998)
- Tri letnja dana (1997)
- Do koske (1997)
- Ulysses' Gaze (1995)
- Urnebesna tragedija (1995)
- Vizantijsko plavo (1993)
- Tito i ja (1992)
- Tajvanska kanasta (1985)
- Kamiondžije opet voze (1984)
- Balkan Express (1983)
- Variola Vera (1982)
- Sok od šljiva (1981)
- Srećna porodica (1979)
- Usijanje (1979)
- National Class Category Up to 785 ccm (1979)
- Miris poljskog cveća (1977)
- Special Education (1977)

=== TV series ===
- Dug moru (2019)
- Otvorena vrata 2 (2013-2014)
- Bolji život (1987-1991)
- Kamiondžije 2 (1984)
- Duvanski put (1981)
