= Majstori, majstori =

- Directed by: Goran Marković
- Written by: Goran Marković; Miroslav Simić
- Produced by: Aleksandar Stojanović
- Starring: Semka Sokolović-Bertok; Bogdan Diklić; Pavle Vuisić; Ljuba Moljac; Aleksandar Berček; Tanja Bošković; Zoran Radmilović
- Cinematography: Marina Milin
- Edited by: Olga Obradov; Vuksan Lukovac
- Music by: Zoran Simjanović
- Production companies: Art film 80; Zvezda film Ineks film - Beograd; Union film Kinema Sarajevo
- Release date: October 27, 1980
- Running time: 83 min
- Country: Yugoslavia
- Language: Serbo-Croatian

Majstori, majstori (lit. 'Handymen, Handymen', translated as All That Jack's) is a 1980 Yugoslav comedy film directed by Goran Marković. It has since become a classic of Serbian cinema. It was digitally restored for its 40th anniversary in a joint effort by the Yugoslav Film Archive and Vip mobile.

The film is named after the first verse of the poem Handymen in the House by writer Aleksandar Sekulić, which is recited in one of the final scenes by a drunken teacher played by Aleksandar Berček.

== Plot ==
The film follows the events and complicated relationships amongst the faculty of an elementary public school in Belgrade, against the backdrop of the retirement ceremony for the school's long-time cleaning lady (janitor) Keva.

On the day of the janitor's retirement, a school board inspector turns up at the school to investigate a complaint against the school's vice principal. Although conceived as an opportunity to relax, the farewell party goes in a completely different direction. The cleaning lady's departure is an ideal opportunity for a party paid covered by the publicly-funded education budget. While the festivities are being prepared, an inspector discovers how bigotry reigns in a school. The cleaning lady, dressed and made up, and the young inspector, driven by the fervor of the investigation, arrive at the same place - a banquet, which becomes the furthest thing from a farewell.

== Cast ==
- Semka Sokolović-Bertok as School principal
- Bogdan Diklić as Miroslav Simić, inspector
- Predrag Laković as Bogdan, vice principal
- Snežana Nikšić as Gordana „Goca“, English teacher
- Milivoje Tomić as Vuksan, treasurer
- Tanja Bošković as Bosa, secretary
- Zoran Radmilović as Sava, technical education teacher
- Aleksandar Berček as Đoka „Viski“, Serbian teacher
- Pavle Vuisić as Stole, janitor
- Olivera Marković as Kristina, biology teacher
- Miodrag Andrić as Šilja, PE teacher
- Stojan Dečermić as Ćira „Emanuela“, art teacher
- Mirjana Karanović as Dunja, math teacher
- Rade Marković as Miloje
- Branko Cvejić as Kole
- Mira Banjac as Ljiljana Grbić, server
- Dobrila Ćirković as Dobrila Stojanović, server
- Smilja Zdravković as Keva, cleaner
- Ratko Tankosić as Keva's son

== Production ==
The film was shot at the "Đorđe Krstić" elementary school in Žarkovo. It was shot in 18 days, without a budget, and the government immediately censored it. Bogdan Diklić's costume consisted of his own prom suit.

In the Hall of the Cultural Center Belgrade, at the celebration of the 40th anniversary of the premiere of the film, Goran Marković said that the actress Rahela Ferari did not forgive him for hiring a real cleaner from the National Theater, Smilja Zdravković, for the role of the cleaner Keva instead of her, for whom it was the first and only film appearance.

== Legacy ==
The Yugoslav Film Archive, in accordance with its authorities based on the Law on Cultural Heritage, declared one hundred Serbian feature films (1911-1999) as cultural heritage of great importance on December 28, 2016. Majstori, majstori is also on that list.
