= National Class Category Up to 785 ccm =

- Directed by: Goran Marković
- Screenplay by: Goran Marković
- Produced by: Milan Žmukić
- Starring: Dragan Nikolić; Bogdan Diklić; Rade Marković; Olivera Marković; Rade Marković; Vojislav Brajović
- Cinematography: Miodrag Mirić
- Edited by: Vuksan Lukovac
- Music by: Zoran Simjanović
- Production company: Centar film
- Release date: 9 January 1979
- Running time: 105 min
- Country: Yugoslavia
- Language: Serbo-Croatian

National Class Category Up to 785 ccm (Serbo-Croatian: Nacionalna klasa do 785 ccm, Serbian Cyrillic: Национална класа до 785 ccm) is a 1979 Yugoslav comedy film directed by Goran Marković.

== Plot ==
A young man from the suburbs of Belgrade, Floyd, a car racer in the national class, in accordance with his passion, is also considered a great lover. But it is not in line with his ambitions to continue racing in the national class. In order to move to a higher class, he must win an important race, and to succeed in this he must postpone his military service. Mile, a kidney patient, who goes to check-ups instead of him, serves him for that. However, it fails, as does avoiding marriage with his "official" girlfriend Šilja, who has become pregnant. In the end, he loses the race, loses his freedom, but gains a friend: only Mile comes to see him off to the army.

== Cast ==
- Dragan Nikolić as Branimir Mitrović "Floyd"
- Gorica Popović as Vukosava Lazarević "Šilja"
- Bogdan Diklić as Mile
- Vojislav Brajović as Papi
- Bora Todorović as Žika "Žilijen"
- Aleksandar Berček as Miki "Bunjuel"
- Maja Lalević as Senka
- Irfan Mensur as Simke Di Džej
- Milivoje Mića Tomić as Strahinja Mitrović, Floyd's Father
- Olivera Marković as Smilja Mitrović, Floyd's Mother
- Rade Marković as Cika Moma Lazarević, Šilja's Father
- Ana Krasojević as Tetka Milica Lazarević, Šilja's Mother
- Danilo Bata Stojković as Drug Čabor
- Dragomir Felba as Cika Rade
- Rahela Ferari as Tetka Nata
- Jelica Sretenović as Jasna (Surovi Pank)
- Alenka Ranchich as Emilija Tsukon
- Slobodan Aligrudić as Vidoje
- Toni Laurencich as Slavoljub Dušanović "Slave"
- Gordana Stojanović as Slavica (Surovi Pank)
- Predrag Milinković as Đole, Car Shop Salesman
- Dragan Kresoja as Car Shop Customer
- Đorđe Nenadović as "Ragacioni"
- Ljubomir Ćipranić as Damage Assessor
- Branimir Petrić Džo as Race Starter
- Dušan Tešić Meca as Race Commentator

== Production ==
The film was shot during the spring and summer of 1978 in Belgrade. It was the first screenplay in the film career of Goran Marković. It came after "Specijalno vaspitanje" (Special Education). In real life, there was no Floyd, but there was a Foyt. That was the nickname of director Branko Baletić, Goran Marković's best friend, who himself participated in rallies before the filming of the movie. Through his character, the fate of the generation to which both of them belong is depicted. To achieve authenticity and credibility in the racing environment, the film actively involved prominent figures from the world of racing.

Dušan Tešić, a journalist who chronicled events on the racetracks and around them for many years, had a dual role. The first was to evoke memories of various racing anecdotes to assist in writing the screenplay, and the second was, as in real races, to play the role of the announcer in the film, who announces in the end that the main character, after all, is not the champion.

The attention to accurately depicting racing experiences during filming is evident in the fact that two racing icons, Branimir Perić Đo and Marjan Kulunđić, were engaged as advisors to the director. Kulunđić, in particular, made sure that expressions in racing jargon, such as "the junta with small nuts" and the like, were authentic. He ensured that Bora Todorović, in the role of Floyd's mechanic, always reached for the tools actually used to fix the "Fićo" in the appropriate scenes.

His role as the race starter in the film is memorable for his harsh decision: "The race is canceled." Interestingly, there was no intention for Đo to try his hand at acting. Đorđe Nenadović was supposed to play that role, but fate had it that he arrived late on the day when that scene was scheduled. At that moment, Goran Marković got frustrated and told Perić, "You're a real starter; you'll play the part." This happened during the most exciting moments of filming the race, on an autocross track next to an old brick factory in Zvezdara, specially constructed for the needs of the film.

Following the example of major international films in this genre where famous racers also appeared as drivers, an important detail for the overall image of the film was that the top Serbian racing ace of that time, Pavle Komnenović, acted as a stuntman for Dragan Nikolić. He was already racing in Formula at the time, so he lent his equipment to the actors for filming, including an attractive helmet, fire-resistant gloves, and two protective suits that other racers did not have at that time. Komnenović was also the stuntman for Floyd's fiercest rival, who at one point veers off the track. Since the rival had better equipment than Floyd, including nicer cars, his car was borrowed from a well-known Partizan hockey player, Bojan Bertuš, and Komnenović's role was not only to drive attractively but also to impressively veer off the track into a nearby field without damaging one of the most beautiful "Fićos" prepared for the National Class racing season, which was about to start.

In the famous fight scene in the film, another Serbian auto-moto sport ace, Momir Filipović, who brought Crvena Zvezda their first championship title in circuit racing, participated.

Apart from the race on the improvised track, which was the work of set designer Miljen Kljaković, driving scenes appear twice more in the film. Both times, the other stuntman for Dragan Nikolić, Milorad Jakšić Fanđo, was behind the wheel. Jakšić was a combination of the racing and acting worlds because, as a cameraman, he also raced. He was behind the wheel of a BMW, which did a "handbrake turn" of 180 degrees to avoid Floyd's "Fićo" in the scene in front of Šumatovac. However, he also drove a Fiat 132 borrowed from his girlfriend's father to impress his second girlfriend.

The Yugoslav Film Archive, in collaboration with Vip Mobile and the film's producer, Center Film, restored this film classic.

== Soundtrack ==
The music release with nine songs came out in 1979, alongside an announcement for the film's release. The album was released in LP format, and the publisher was PGP-RTB. The music was composed by Zoran Simjanović, the lyrics were written by Marina Tucaković, and the singers featured on the album include Dado Topić, Slađana Milošević, Laboratorija Zvuka (Vranešević), Oliver Mandić, Oliver Dragojević, and Zumreta Midžić-Zuzi.

Song list:

- А1. Floyd – Dado Topić
- А2. Imam sve – Slađana Milošević
- А3. Zašto – instrumental
- А4. Mirišem – Laboratorija Zvuka (Vranešević)
- B1. Nacionalna klasa – instrumental
- B2. Cvećke i zloćke – Oliver Mandić
- B3. Zašto – Oliver Dragojević
- B4. Hoby – Zumreta Midžić-Zuzi
- B5. Floyd – instrumental

== Awards ==
At the Filmski susreti Festival in Niš in 1979, Dragan Nikolić received the Tsar Konstantin Award for Best Male Actor.

== Legacy ==
The Yugoslav Film Archive, in accordance with its authorities under the Law on Cultural Heritage, declared one hundred Serbian feature films (1911-1999) as cultural heritage of great importance on December 28, 2016. National Class Category Up to 785 ccm is also included in this list.
