= Loving Glances =

- Directed by: Srđan Karanović
- Produced by: Mike Downey; Sam Taylor; Zoran Cvijanović; Milko Josifov; Bijana Prvanovic
- Starring: Senad Alihodzic, Ivana Bolanca
- Cinematography: Radan Popovic
- Edited by: Branka Ceperac, Branka Pavlovic
- Music by: Zoran Simjanović
- Distributed by: Film and Music Entertainment; Yodi Movie Craftsman
- Release date: 2003
- Running time: 97 minutes
- Countries: Serbia and Montenegro; UK
- Language: Serbian

Loving Glances (Serbian: Sjaj u očima) is a 2003 Serbian language romantic comedy directed by Srđan Karanović.

== Cast ==
- Senad Alihodžić as Labud
- Ivana Bolanča as Romana
- Jelena Đokić as Vida
- Milena Dravić as Vlasnica agencije
- Gorica Popović as Majka
- Boris Komnenić as Professor Jablan
- Matija Prskalo as Agnes
- Lotos Šparovec as Igor
- Branko Cvejić as Otac
- Bisera Veletanlić as Ljubiteljka muzike
- Predrag Danilović as NBA kosarkas
- Mirjana Djurdjevic as Maskirna
- Andrew Greenwood as Michael
- Steve Agnew as Konzularni Sluzbenik
- Danijel Nikolic as Policajac
- Bojana Bambic as Ruskinja
- Goran Danicic as Gangster
- Marija Opsenica as Intelektualka
- Stevan Jovanovic as Odzacar
- Laza Jovanovic as Covek u vozu (as Lazar Jovanovic)
- Petar Cirica as Mladic iz parka
- Zoran Cvijanovic – Covek u kolima (uncredited)

== Release ==
Loving Glances was released on 24 September 2003.

== Awards ==
- Loving Glances was nominated for a Golden Lion at the 2003 Venice Film Festival.
- It was nominated for a Gold Hugo Award for 'Best Feature' at the Chicago International Film Festival in 2003.
