= Miljen Kljaković =

Serbian production designer

- Born: 22 November 1950 (age 74); Osijek, Yugoslavia
- Occupation(s): Production designer Art director
- Years active: 1977–present

Miljen "Kreka" Kljaković (Serbian Cyrillic: Миљен Кљаковић; born 22 November 1950), is a Serbian production designer and art director. He was awarded César Award and European Film Award for Best Production Design for his work in Delicatessen. Kljaković is a full member of Art Directors Guild. He is considered to be Serbia's best-known film production designer.

== Filmography ==
- Martin Scorsese Presents: The Saints (2024)
- The Survivor (2021)
- Intrigo: Samaria (2019)
- Intrigo: Dear Agnes (2019)
- Intrigo: Death of an Author (2019)
- Tau (2018)
- An Ordinary Man (2017)
- Mohammad Rasoolollah (2015)
- The Pillars of the Earth (TV Mini-Series) (2010)
- St. George Shoots the Dragon (2009)
- War, Inc. (2008)
- Köshpendiler (2005)
- Secret Passage (2004)
- The Order (2003)
- Helen of Troy (2003)
- Dune (TV Mini-Series) (2000)
- I Love You, Baby (2000)
- Species II (1998)
- The Brave (1997)
- Rasputin: Dark Servant of Destiny (1996)
- Bila jednom jedna zemlja (TV Mini-Series) (1995)
- Underground (1995)
- Arizona Dream (1993)
- Dom za vesanje (1988)
- The Bulldance (1988)
- Jagode u grlu (1985)
- Tajvanska kanasta (1985)
- Nema problema (1984)
- Jaguarov skok (1984)
- The Elusive Summer of '68 (1984)
- How I Was Systematically Destroyed by an Idiot (1983)
- Nesto izmedju (1982)
- Sok od sljiva (1981)
- Prestop (1980)
- Petria's Wreath (1980)
- Kur pranvera vonohet (1979)
- Miris poljskog cveca (1977)
- Specijalno vaspitanje (1977)
