= Zoran Simjanović =

Serbian composer (1946–2021)

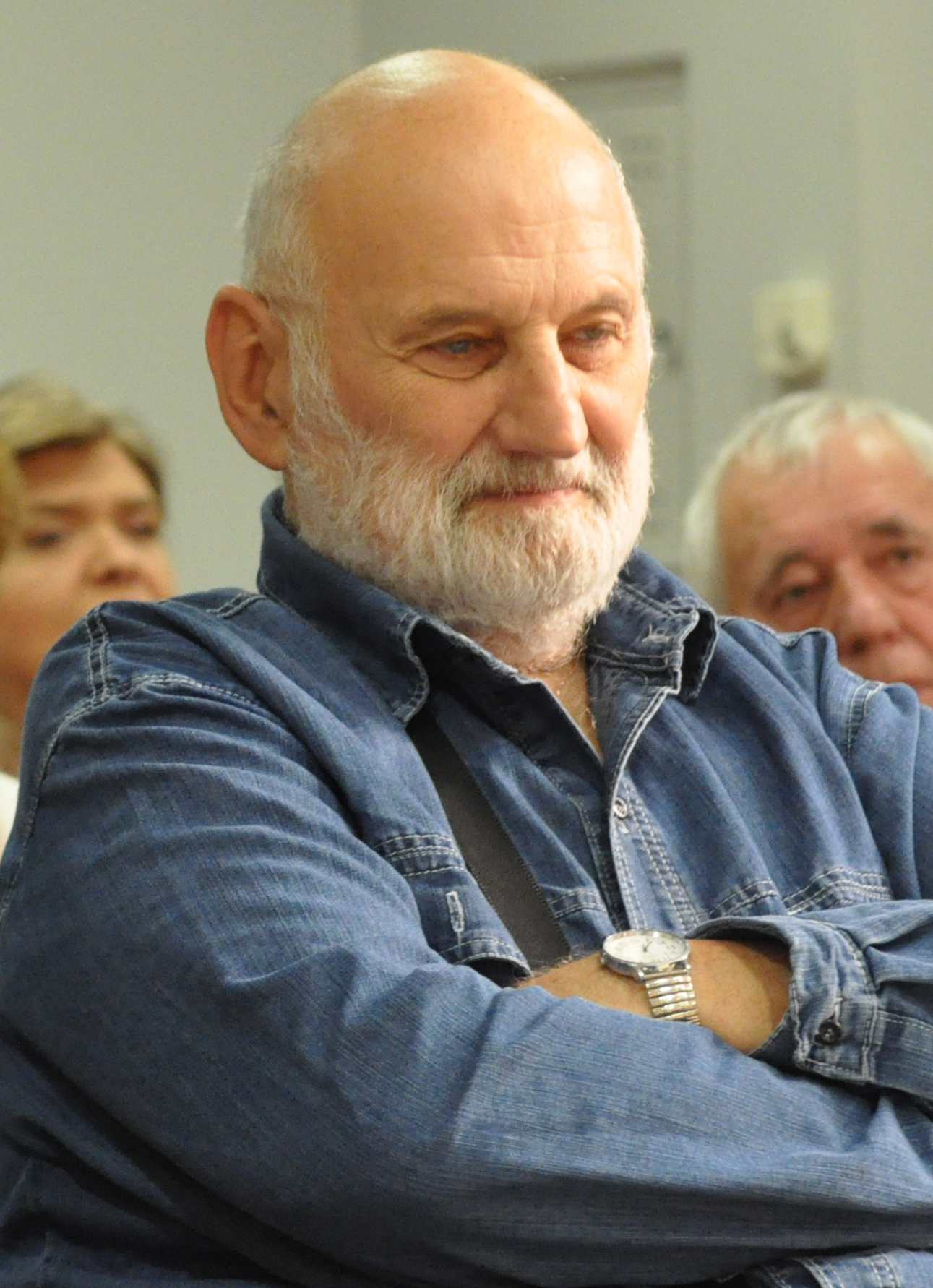
- Zoran Simjanović in 2018

Background information
- Born: 11 May 1946; Belgrade, PR Serbia, FPR Yugoslavia
- Origin: Belgrade, Serbia
- Died: 11 April 2021 (aged 74) Belgrade, Serbia
- Occupations: Musician, composer
- Instrument: Keyboards
- Years active: 1961–2021

Zoran Simjanović (pronounced [zǒran simjǎːnoʋitɕ]; 11 May 1946 – 11 April 2021) was a Serbian and Yugoslav musician, composer and music educator.

Simjanović started his career in 1961, as the keyboardist for the rock band Siluete. In 1962, he moved to the band Elipse, achieving nationwide popularity with the group. After Elipse disbanded in 1968, Simjanović graduated at the Belgrade Music Academy and dedicated himself to composing. He wrote songs for popular Yugoslav singers, and, since 1973, composed scores for cinema, television and theatre in Yugoslavia and abroad, spawning many different genres. He wrote music for 65 feature films, winning numerous awards for his scores. He was a professor at the Belgrade Faculty of Drama Arts, the Belgrade Faculty of Music Arts and the Cetinje Music Academy. He was a member of the European Film Academy, International Animated Film Association and the French Society of Authors, Composers and Music Editors.

== Early life ==
Zoran Simjanović was born in Belgrade on 11 May 1946. At the age of six he began playing the piano, and later he attended the Mokranjac Music School.

== Career ==
=== Rock musician (1961–1968) ===
In 1961, Simjanović was among the forming members of the beat band Siluete, in which he played the keyboards. In 1963, he moved to the band Elipse. With Elipse Simjanović achieved nationwide popularity. The band's live performances and releases were praised by the Yugoslav music press, and Yugoslav media promoted rivalry between Elipse and Siluete, comparing it to the one between The Rolling Stones and The Beatles. Elipse initially performed beat and rhythm and blues, and in 1968, with the arrival of African vocalist Edi Dekeng, added a brass section and moved towards soul music. During their six-year career, Elipse held hundreds of concerts and performed as an opening band on The Searchers and The Hollies concerts in Yugoslavia.

In 1967, Elipse appeared in the movies The Naughty Ones, directed by Kokan Rakonjac, and The Rats Woke Up, directed by Živojin Pavlović. The Naughty Ones were the first Yugoslav and Balkan film to feature a performance of a rock band. The music for the film was written by composer Zoran Hristić. As he lacked experience in composing popular music, he cooperated with Simjanović on the film score. After this cooperation, Hristić persuaded Simjanović to quit his studies of law and to study music.

With Elipse Simjanović released three EPs. The band disbanded in 1968, when the band members decided to dedicate themselves to their studies. Elipse songs released on the EPs, along with the unreleased material, appeared on the compilation album Elipse za prijatelje (1963–1968) (Elipse for Friends), released by Simjanović through his own independent record label Simke Music in 1999.

=== Popular music composer (1968–1979) ===
After Elipse disbanded, Simjanović composed music for various popular music artists, including Seka Kojadinović, Dušan Prelević, Zdravo, and Zafir Hadžimanov and Senka Veletanlić. In 1976, Simjanović wrote music for songs "Dalje, dalje" ("Further, Further") and "Gde je kraj snovima mojim" ("Where Do My Dreams End") on the lyrics of writers Milovan Vitezović and Ljubivoje Ršumović respectively; the songs were recorded by the long jumper Nenad Stekić. He also wrote arrangements for songs recorded by Olivera Katarina, Zafir Hadžimanov, Vlastimir Đuza Stojiljković and Senka Veletanlić. At the end of 1970s, he stopped composing songs for popular music artists and dedicated himself to film, theatre and television music.

=== Film, theatre and television composer (1973–2021) ===
After he graduated at the Belgrade Music Academy, Simjanović turned towards music for film, theatre and television. He debuted in this field in 1973, with music for children's television series Slike bez rama – iz dečijih knjiga (Frameless Pictures – From Children's Books). In 1975, he wrote music for Srđan Karanović's TV series The Unpicked Strawberries, and in 1977, he wrote music for his first feature film, Goran Marković's Special Education. His cooperation with Karanović and Marković would continue during the following decades. The most notable films for which he wrote music were Special Education (1977), Fragrance of Wild Flowers (1977), National Class Category Up to 785 ccm (1979), Petria's Wreath (1980), May 8 1980 (1980), All That Jack's (1980), Do You Remember Dolly Bell? (1981), The Marathon Family (1982), Variola Vera (1982), Something in Between (1983), Balkan Express (1983), Taiwan Canasta (1985), Hard to Swallow (1985), When Father Was Away on Business (1985), Hey Babu Riba (1986), The Beauty of Vice (1986), Reflections (1987), Guardian Angel (1987), A Film with No Name (1988), Cognac (1988), Balkan Express 2 (1988), Time of Miracles (1989), The Meeting Point (1989), Virgina (1991), Tango Argentino (1992), Tito and Me (1992), Say Why Have You Left Me (1993), The Tragic Burlesque (1995), Cabaret Balkan (1998), Serbia, Year Zero (2001), Loving Glances (2003), Midwinter Night's Dream (2004), The Tour (2008), Solemn Promise (2009), Falsifier (2013). Until his death in 2021, he has written music scores for 65 feature films. On the Pula Film Festival he was awarded the Golden Arena for Best Film Music twice, for The Fragrance of Wild Flowers in 1978 and for Balkan Express in 1983. In 1983, he shared the Special Award of the City of Valencia with Yves Montand. For that occasion he wrote music for the opening of that year's Festival in Valencia. Simjanović also wrote music for over 40 short films and for over 30 short animated films.

Music composed for the films Special Education, Fragrance of Wild Flowers, National Class Category Up to 785 ccm, Sok od šljiva, Balkan Express, When Father Was Away on Business, Hard to Swallow, Guardian Angel, Balkan Express 2 and Cabaret Balkan were released on soundtrack albums. For the recording of the soundtrack album for the film National Class Category Up to 785 ccm, a supergroup Mag (Wizard) was formed, consisting of former Korni Grupa member Josip Boček (guitar), former Elipse and Korni Grupa members Bojan Hreljac (bass guitar) and Vladimir "Furda" Furduj (drums), composer and former San member Sanja Ilić (keyboards) and composer and musician Sloba Marković (keyboards). Mag played the songs composed by Zoran Simjanović, with lyrics written by lyricist Marina Tucaković, and the vocals were recorded by popular Yugoslav singers Dado Topić, Oliver Dragojević, Slađana Milošević, Oliver Mandić, Zumreta Midžić "Zuzi" and the members of the band Laboratorija Zvuka. Two of the songs written for the film, "Floyd", performed by Dado Topić, and "Zašto" ("Why"), performed by Oliver Dragojević, became nationwide hits. For the film Hard to Swallow, Simjanović wrote new arrangements for the well-known themes like "My Bonnie", "El Cóndor Pasa", "Banana Boat Song", "Love Me Tender", "'O sole mio" and "O mladosti", and they were performed in the film by Romani orchestra Orkestar Lepog Jovice. On the recording of Cabaret Balkan soundtrack, Simjanović played the keyboards, Zlatko Manojlović played the guitar, Bora Dugić played the flute, Branko Kamenković played the bouzouki, and Vlada Korać played the percussion. The theme "Srbijanče" ("Little Serbian") was played by a Romani orchestra, and the song "Close Your Eyes to Pain" featured Israeli singer David D'Or as the vocalist and the author of the lyrics. The soundtrack album opens with a narration by actor Ljuba Tadić. In 1999, Simjanović released the compilation album Slike iz Sarajeva koje sam voleo (Images from Sarajevo which I Loved), featuring his compositions written for films shot in Sarajevo. He released two box sets featuring his film music, Jedna tema jedan film / One Theme One Film (2002), and Pesme iz filmova (Songs from the Movies, 2006), the latter featuring four discs, each consisting of songs fitting in one of four genres – rock, pop, jazz and ethnic music. Serbian jazz quartet NaissBlue recorded an album featuring covers of Simjanović's film themes, entitled The Art of Mr. Simjanović and released in 2017.

During his career, Simjanović composed scores for over 20 theatre plays in various Belgrade theatres, as well as for the musicals Beogradosti (the title being a word play which could be translated as Joys of Belgrade), Ribe u moru (The Fish in the Sea), Male tajne (Little Secrets) and several cabarets. Simjanovć wrote music for Beogradosti on the lyrics of writer Milovan Vitezović. It was released in 1980 on the album of the same title. With Italian director Paolo Magelli he worked on the Paris version of Machiavelli's The Mandrake, and after its success he cooperated with Magelli again, on the play The Straitjacket. In 2010, Simjanović released the five-piece box set entitled Moje drage (My Darling Ones), featuring his music composed for theatre, accompanied by essays written by Vida Ognjenović, Paolo Magelli and Goran Marković.

=== Academic career (1993–2021) ===
From 1993 until his death, Simjanović was a professor of applied music at the Faculty of Drama Arts in Belgrade. From 1999 to 2002, he was giving lectures in the same field at the Belgrade Faculty of Music Arts and from 2000 to 2002, at the University of Montenegro Music Academy in Cetinje, Montenegro. He also lectured at Dunav Film School, Post-Secondary School of Electrical Engineering and Braća Karić Academy of Fine Arts.

In 1996, he published the book Primenjena muzika (Applied Music). He wrote articles for Leksikon filmskih i televizijskih pojmova (Lexicon of Film and TV terms). He collaborated in making of pedagogical music books for children with Lela Aleksić, Branka Cvejić and Zora Vasiljević.

=== Other activities ===
In 2004, Simjanović published an autobiographical book entitled Kako sam postao (i prestao da budem) roker (How I Started (and Stopped) Being a Rocker).

Simjanović first symphony, The Symphony of New Ideas, had its premiere at Belgrade Fortress on 14 July 2006. It was the first Serbian symphony written in the 21st century.

During his career, Simjanović wrote music for over 500 television commercials. Another significant contribution as a composer in the field of television was the theme for the newscast Dnevnik in 1979, recorded with the participation of members from Korni Grupa.

In the films Special Education and National Class Category Up to 785 ccm he appeared in cameo roles.

== Death ==
Simjanović died on 11 April 2021 in Belgrade, aged 74, due to complications caused by COVID-19 during the COVID-19 pandemic in Serbia.

== Awards and honors ==
- Golden Arena for Best Film Music for the Fragrance of Wild Flowers music score at the Pula Film Festival (1978)
- Golden Arena for Best Film Music for the Balkan Express music score at the Pula Film Festival (1983)
- First Prize for Music for the When Father Was Away on Business music score at the Mladenovac Festival of Film Music, Costumes and Scenography.
- First Prize for Music for Jat Airways promotional campaign at the Yugoslav Radio Television Festival of Audio and Video Clips in Budva (1988)
- Award for the Tito and Me music score at the Herceg Novi Festival of Film Direction (1992)
- Crystal Prism for the Tango Argentino music score at the Yugoslav Film Academy Award (1993)
- First Prize for the Kazimir Malyevic’s Cross, Square and Circle music score at the Belgrade Festival of Short and Documentary Film (1993)
- Annual Work Award at the Belgrade Festival of Short and Documentary Film (1994)
- Best Music Score at the Čačak Festival of Animated Film (1995)
- Award for the Belgrade Follies music score at the Belgrade Festival of Short and Documentary Film (1998)
- Boro Tamindžić Award for the In the Name of the Father and the Son music score at the Mojkovac Film Festival (1999)
- Best Music Score Award for the Cabaret Balkan music score at Sunčane Skale festival (2000)
- Award of the City of Belgrade for Radio, Television and Film Making for The Cordon music score and Jedna tema jedan film / One Theme One Film album (2002)
- Platinum Award for Best Music for the Loving Glances music score at Monte Carlo Film Festival (2003)
- Shield of the Festival at the Belgrade Festival of Short and Documentary Film 50th anniversary (2003)
- Award for the Loving Glances music score at the Herceg Novi Festival of Film Direction (2004)
- FIPRESCI Best Music Award for The Tour music score (2009)
- Lifka Award for Exceptional Contribution to Cinematography at the Palić Festival of European Film (2012)
- Award for Lifetime Achievement and Contribution to Serbian Cinema by the Association of Film Artists of Serbia (2012)
- FIPRESCI Best Music Award for the Falsifier music score (2013)
- Award for Contribution to Film Art at the Novi Sad Cinema City Festival (2014).
- The Golden Antenna at the Festival of Domestic TV Series (2014).
- Golden Medal for Merits by the President of Serbia Tomislav Nikolić (2015)
- The Golden Ring by the Cultural and Educational Association of Belgrade (2015)
- Darko Kraljić Lifetime Achievement Award by the Association of Composers of Serbia (2018)

== Discography ==
=== With Elipse ===
==== Extended plays ====
- Sentimental Baby / Plaža (split EP with Perica Stojančić; 1965)
- Pogledaj kroz prozor (1966)
- Le Telelphone (1967)

==== Compilation albums ====
- Elipse za prijatelje (1963–1968) (1999)

=== Solo ===
==== Studio albums ====
- Beogradosti (with Milovan Vitezović; 1980)

==== Soundtrack albums ====
- Originalna muzika iz filma Nacionalna klasa (1979)
- Sok od šljiva – Muzika iz filma (1981)
- Muzika iz filma Balkan ekspres (1983)
- Papa Est En Voyage D' Affaires – Bande Original Du Film (1985)
- Jagode u grlu – Muzika iz filma (1985)
- Anđeo čuvar - Originalna muzika iz filma Gorana Paskaljevića (1987)
- Balkan Express 2 – Muzika iz filma i TV serije (1989)
- Bure baruta – Originalna muzika iz filma (1998)

==== Soundtrack EPs ====
- Specijalno vaspitanje (1977)
- Miris poljskog cveća – Originalna muzika iz filma (1978)

==== Singles ====
- Finale Evrope (with Boris Bizetić; 1976)

==== Compilations ====
- Jedna tema - jedan film (1982)
- Balkan eskpres – Originalna muzika iz filmova (1999)
- Slike iz Sarajeva koje sam voleo (1999)

==== Box sets ====
- Jedna tema jedan film / One Theme One Film (2002)
- Pesme iz filmova (2006)
- Moje drage (2010)
- Radio i TV trezor Zorana Simjanovića (2015)

== Filmography ==
=== Cinema ===
- Special Education (1977)
- Fragrance of Wild Flowers (1977)
- Boško Buha (1978)
- National Class Category Up to 785 ccm (1979)
- The Days on Earth Are Flowing (1979)
- Draga moja Iza (1979)
- Petria's Wreath (1980)
- All That Jack's (1980)
- Gazija (1981)
- Some Other Woman (1981)
- Sok od šljiva (1981)
- Do You Remember Dolly Bell? (1981)
- The Marathon Family (1982)
- Dvije polovine srca (1982)
- Variola Vera (1982)
- Something in Between (1983)
- Three Contributions to the Slovenian Madness (1983)
- Balkan Express (1983)
- Idi mi, dođi mi (1983)
- Opasni trag (1984)
- Moljac (1984)
- Maturanti (Pazi šta radiš) (1984)
- Šta se zgodi kad se ljubav rodi (1984)
- Šta je s tobom, Nina (1984)
- Žikina dinastija (1985)
- Taiwan Canasta (1985)
- I to će proći (1985)
- Hard to Swallow (1985)
- When Father Was Away on Business (1985)
- Hey Babu Riba (1986)
- The Beauty of Vice (1986)
- Reflections (1987)
- Uvek spremne žene (1987)
- Lager Niš (1987)
- Život radnika (1987)
- Guardian Angel (1987)
- A Film with No Name (1988)
- Journey to the South (1988)
- Cognac (1988)
- Drugi čovek (1988)
- Balkan Express 2 (1988)
- Time of Miracles (1989)
- Uroš blesavi (1989)
- Švedski aranžman (1989)
- Masmediologija na Balkanu (1989)
- The Meeting Point (1989)
- Balkanska perestrojka (1990)
- Stanica običnih vozova (1990)
- Virgina (1991)
- Tango Argentino (1992)
- Tito and Me (1992)
- Say Why Have You Left Me (1993)
- Terrace on the Roof (1995)
- The Tragic Burlesque (1995)
- Belgrade Follies (1997)
- Cabaret Balkan (1998)
- In the name of the Father and Son (1999)
- Serbia, Year Zero (2001)
- The Cordon (2002)
- Loving Glances (2003)
- Falling in the Paradise (2004)
- Midwinter Night's Dream (2004)
- Balkan Brothers (2005)
- The Tour (2008)
- Solemn Promise (2009)
- Falsifier (2013)
- Delirijum tremens (2019)

=== TV films ===
- Ljubičice (1975)
- Sve što je bilo lepo (1976)
- Noć od paučine (1978)
- The Brides Are Coming (1978)
- Pucanj u šljiviku preko reke (1979)
- Mostarske kiše (1979)
- Buffet Titanic (1979)
- Boško Buha (1980)
- Samo za dvoje (1980)
- Ćorkan i Švabica (1980)
- Čeličenje Pavla Pletikose (1981)
- Četvrtak umesto petka (1982)
- Don Žuan se vraća iz rata (1982)
- Jelena Gavanski (1982)
- Malograđani (1983)
- Kaleidoskop dvadesetog veka (1984)
- Dvostruki udar (1985)
- Budite isti za 20 godina (1985)
- Griffon u Beogradu (1986)
- Apstinenti (1989)
- Hole in the Soul (1984)
- Prolece u Limasolu(1999)
- Harold i Mod (2001)
- Osma sednica ili Život je san (2007)
- Zlatno tele (2010)
- Equals (2014)
- A Stowaway on the Ship of Fools (2016)

=== TV series ===
- Slike bez rama – iz dečijih knjiga (1973)
- The Unpicked Strawberries (1975)
- Junaci (1976)
- Gledajući televiziju (1977)
- RTB Dnevnik (1979)
- Ne tako davno (1984)
- Jadranski otoci (1985)
- Thune (2008)
- Tajne vinove loze (2021)

== Bibliography ==
- Primenjena muzika (1996)
- Kako sam postao (i prestao da budem) roker (2004)
