= A Stowaway on the Ship of Fools =

2016 Serbian film

- Official movie poster
- Directed by: Goran Marković
- Written by: Vule Žurić
- Produced by: Marija Bereta; Dragana Bogdanović; Biljana Carević; Milorad Konrad; Miloš M. Radović
- Starring: Igor Đorđević; Tihomir Stanić; Aleksandar Đurica; Maša Dakić
- Cinematography: Đorđe Arambašić
- Edited by: Tihomir Dukić
- Music by: Zoran Simjanović
- Production company: RTS
- Distributed by: RTS
- Release date: 27 December 2016
- Running time: 102 minutes
- Country: Serbia
- Language: Serbian

A Stowaway on the Ship of Fools (Serbian: Слепи путник на броду лудака) is a 2016 Serbian historical drama film directed by Goran Marković.

== Plot ==
The story takes place in the Belgrade mental hospital on Guberevac during World War I, where notable Serbian writer Petar Kočić spends his last years of life. The safety of mental hospital in a war-torn Belgrade is disrupted when Kosta Herman, the deputy military governor in occupied Belgrade, finds out that Kočić is in the hospital and decides to settle old scores with him.

== Cast ==
- Igor Đorđević as Petar Kočić
- Aleksandar Đurica as Kosta Herman
- Tihomir Stanić as Dr. Stojimirović
- Maša Dakić as Elena
- Radoje Čupić as Dr. Subotić
- Jelena Đokić as Dr. Slavka
- Andrijana Oliverić as Bošnjakovićka
- Goran Šušljik as Burbon
- Nemanja Oliverić as Bertold
- Aleksandar Srećković as Arsa Lord
- Srđan Timarov as Dušan Srezojević
- Zinaida Dedakin as tetka Mara
- Radovan Miljanić as Poslanik Dimitrijević
- Miroljub Lešo as otac prota
- Branko Jerinić as Tutunović
- Jovan Jovanović as Jovan

== Production ==
RTS joined the commemoration of 100 years of death of Petar Kočić.

The movie was released as a two-part TV movie and as a theatre release.

Igor Đorđević was awarded the best male role award at SOFEST.
