= A Film with No Name =

- Serbian: Za Sada Bez Dobrog Naslova
- Directed by: Srđan Karanović
- Starring: Meto Jovanovski; Mira Furlan
- Cinematography: Bozidar 'Bota' Nikolic
- Edited by: Branka Ceperac
- Music by: Zoran Simjanović
- Production companies: Beograd Film; Centar Film
- Release date: January 12, 1988 (Yugoslavia)
- Running time: 89 minutes
- Country: Yugoslavia
- Languages: Serbo-Croatian; Albanian

A Film with No Name (Serbo-Croatian: Za sada bez dobrog naslova, Serbian Cyrillic: За сада без доброг наслова) is a 1988 Yugoslav drama film directed by Srđan Karanović. It won Golden Tulip Award at the International Istanbul Film Festival in 1989.

In terms of genre, it is a blend of drama, mockumentary and dark comedy, and it was inspired by the escalation of the Serbian-Albanian conflict, specifically the dramatic deterioration of relations between the majority Albanian population and the minority Serbs in the then Socialist Autonomous Province of Kosovo.

The story simultaneously depicts the brutally interrupted love story between a Kosovo Serb and an Albanian girl, as well as attempts to make a feature film about it. A Film with No Name has been characterized by an unusual style and a large dose of irony, but it quickly fell into oblivion, which is attributed to the escalation of the political crisis in Yugoslavia and the anti-bureaucratic revolution, after which Karanović fell out of favor with Milošević's regime.

== Plot ==
In a town in Kosovo, a Serbian-Albanian love story is brutally interrupted. A director from the capital city goes with a video camera to record the participants in the events, the work of investigative authorities, and the families of the lovers. The story unfolds through the interweaving of multiple layers: official television footage, personal video recordings of the director and his attempt to turn the material into a feature film. Everyone has their own perspective on this event, their own interpretation, and offers their advice for the best solution.

== Cast ==
- Meto Jovanovski as film director
- Mira Furlan as actress
- Čedomir Orobabić as Miroljub
- Sonja Jačevska as Nadira
- Eva Ras as Ruža
- Jelica Sretenović as secretary
- Mladen Andrejević as dramaturge
- Đuza Stojiljković as DP officer
- Nada Gešovska as mother
- Kiro Ćortošev as father
- Branko Cvejić as friend 1
- Josif Tatić as friend 2
- Abdurahman Šalja as producer
- Enver Petrovci as inspector
- Ljubomir Ćipranić as nurse
- Mira Banjac as cashier
- Milivoje Tomić as critic
- Ratko Tankosić
- Boro Begović as principal
- Mustafa Preševa as doctor
- Ned Vidaković
