= Bogdan Diklić =

Serbian actor

- Богдан Диклић
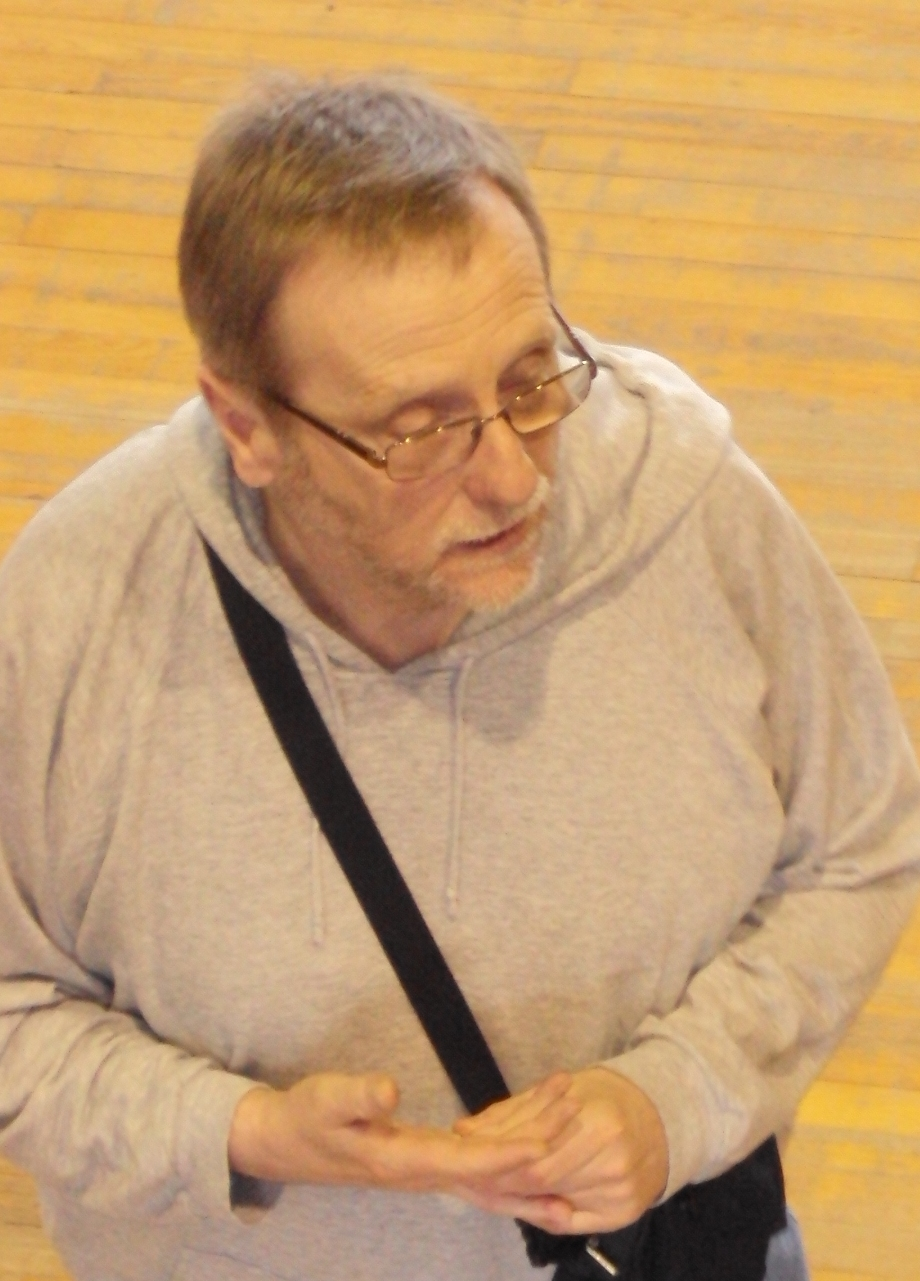
- Born: 1 August 1953 (age 72); Bjelovar, PR Croatia, FPR Yugoslavia
- Occupation: Actor
- Years active: 1976–present

Bogdan Diklić (Serbian Cyrillic: Богдан Диклић; [bǒɡdan dǐklitɕ]; born 1 August 1953) is a Serbian actor. He has been active since the late 1970s and starred in over one hundred Yugoslav films and television series. Diklić made ten films with director Goran Marković. In August 2009, he received the Lifetime Achievement Award "Pavle Vujisić" for his body of work in Yugoslav cinematography.

== Early life ==
He finished primary and secondary school in Bjelovar. In 1972, he enrolled in acting at the Faculty of Dramatic Arts in Belgrade in the class of Ognjenka Milićević.

== Career ==
He became popular after his notable role in the film National Class Category Up to 785 ccm (1979). His notable film roles include All That Jack's (1980), Variola vera (1982), The Marathon Family (1982), Unseen Wonder (1984), Oktoberfest (1987), The Meeting Point (1989), Three Tickets to Hollywood (1993), Barking at the Stars (1998), Cabaret Balkan (1999) and Small World (2003).

On television, he acted in the series The Unpicked Strawberries (1976), The Siamese (1981), Truckers 2 (1983), Erased space (1985), Balkan Express 2 (1989), Open Doors (1995).

From 1975 to 1995, he was a permanent member of the National Theater in Belgrade and acted in the plays Caligula, War and Peace, As You Like It, Trouble with the Mind, The Minister's Wife, Orestia, Tartuffe and A Swanky Pumpkin.

Since 1995, he has been a member of the JDP in Belgrade, where he acts in the plays Belgrade Trilogy, Moliere: Another Life, Italian Night, and in the play Pandora's Box at the Belgrade Drama Theater. He acted in Oxymoron at the Kult Theater in Belgrade. In the Zvezdara Theater, he acted in the plays The Professional, Kiss of the Spider Woman, The Funny Side of Music.

In 2011, he published the book About acting without acting. He lives and works in Belgrade.

== Filmography ==
=== Film ===
Year	Title	Role	Notes
1979	National Class Category Up to 785 ccm	Mile	
1980	All That Jack's	inspector Simić	
1982	The Marathon Family	Mirko Topalović	
1982	Variola Vera	Duško	
1983	Balkan Express	Žuti	
1984	In the Jaws of Life	Pipo	
1984	Unseen Wonder	engineer	
1984	The End of the War	Alojziije	
1985	Taiwan Canasta	Draženko	
1985	Three for Happiness	Jozo	
1987	Oktoberfest	Vanja	
1987	King's Endgame	Božo	
1989	The Fall of Rock and Roll	Slobodan	
1989	The Meeting Point	Petar	
1992	We Are Not Angels	Pavle	
1992	The Black Bomber	Glavonja	
1993	Three Tickets to Hollywood	Zivadin	
1998	Cabaret Balkan	Jovan, the VW Driver	
1998	Barking at the Stars	Đuro Dragićević	
1998	Wheels	Coric	
1999	The White Suit	Machine worker	
2001	No Man's Land	Serbian officer	
2001	Absolute 100	Raša Knežević	
2002	Headnoise	Teršič	
2003	The Cordon	Borko	
2003	Fuse	Zaim	
2004	The Robbery of the Third Reich	Doktor	
2004	Sex, Drink and Bloodshed	neighbour	
2004	Take a Deep Breath	Miloš	
2006	The Border Post	Col. Rade Orhideja	
2006	Grbavica	Šaran	
2007	The Trap	Doktor Lukić	
2007	The Fourth Man	Colonel	
2008	The Tour	Commander ZNG	
2010	72 Days	Joja	
2013	Falsifier	lawyer	
2013	Mamaroš	Pera Ilić	
2018	South Wind	Lazar Maraš	

=== Television ===
Year	Title	Role	Notes
1975	The Unpicked Strawberries	Bogdan Ž. Savić „Boca” („Čombe”)	
1978	The return of the Written Offs	Žule	
1994	Open Doors	Svetislav "Bata" Anđelić	
2017	Shadows over Balkan	Obrad Savković	
2020	South Wind	Lazar Maraš	
