= Small World (2003 film) =

2003 film

A Small World
- Directed by: Milos Radović
- Starring: Miki Manojlović; Lazar Ristovski
- Release date: 20 August 2003
- Running time: 90 min
- Countries: Serbia and Montenegro
- Language: Serbian

A Small World is a 2003 Serbian comedy film directed by Milos Radović.

== Cast ==
- Miki Manojlović - Dr. Filip Kostic
- Lazar Ristovski - Stariji vodnik Ras
- Branko Đurić - Osumnjiceni
- Bogdan Diklić - Mladji vodnik Kos
- Irena Micijevic - Marija Dekleva
- Ana Sofrenovic - Dr. Ana Kostic
- Milorad Mandić - Policajac na motoru
- Aleksa Bastovanovic - Filipov nerodjeni sin Ogi
- Rade Marković - Stari doktor
- Olivera Marković - Baba na groblju
- Milan Gutović - Svestenik
- Petar Kralj - Lekar hitne pomoci
