= The Cordon =

2003 Yugoslavian film directed by Goran Markovic

- Directed by: Goran Marković
- Written by: Goran Markovic; Nebojsa Romcevic
- Produced by: Jorge De Juan; Ljuba Djordjevic; Slobodan Jocic
- Cinematography: Predrag Popovic
- Release date: 2002
- Running time: 70 minute
- Country: FR Yugoslavia
- Language: Serbian

The Cordon (Serbian: Кордон; Croatian: Kordon;) is a 2002 Yugoslavian film directed by Goran Marković. It won Grand Prix des Amériques, the main prize at the Montreal World Film Festival. Marković's film focuses on one police “cordon” (patrol) against the 1996–1997 protests in Serbia that attempted to overthrow Slobodan Milošević.

== Cast ==
- Milutin Milosevic as Aca
- Marko Nikolic as Zmaj
- Dragan Petrovic-Pele as Crni (as Dragan Petrovic)
- Nenad Jezdic as Seljak
- Nikola Djuricko as Dusan
- Nebojsa Milovanovic as Kole
- Ratko Tankosic as Uros
- Masa Dakic as Zorica (as Marija Dakic)
- Bogdan Diklic as Borko
- Olivera Markovic as Baka na klupi
- Hristina Popovic as Jelena
- Radmila Tomovic as Bojana
- Bojana Tusup as Jelenina drugarica
- Nebojsa Ilic as Covek na portirnici
- Marko Bacovic as Hirurg
- Milica Zaric as Medicinska sestra 1
- Miomira Dragicevic as Medicinska sestra 2 (as Miomira C...)
- Marija Jaksic as Medicinska sestra 3
