= Kljaković =

Kljaković is a surname. Notable people with the surname include:

- Ivan Kljaković Gašpić (born 1984), Croatian sailor
- Jozo Kljaković (1889–1969), Croatian painter
- Miljen Kljaković (born 1950), Serbian production designer and art director
