= Tanja Bošković =

Yugoslavian and Serbian actress

- Тања Бошковић
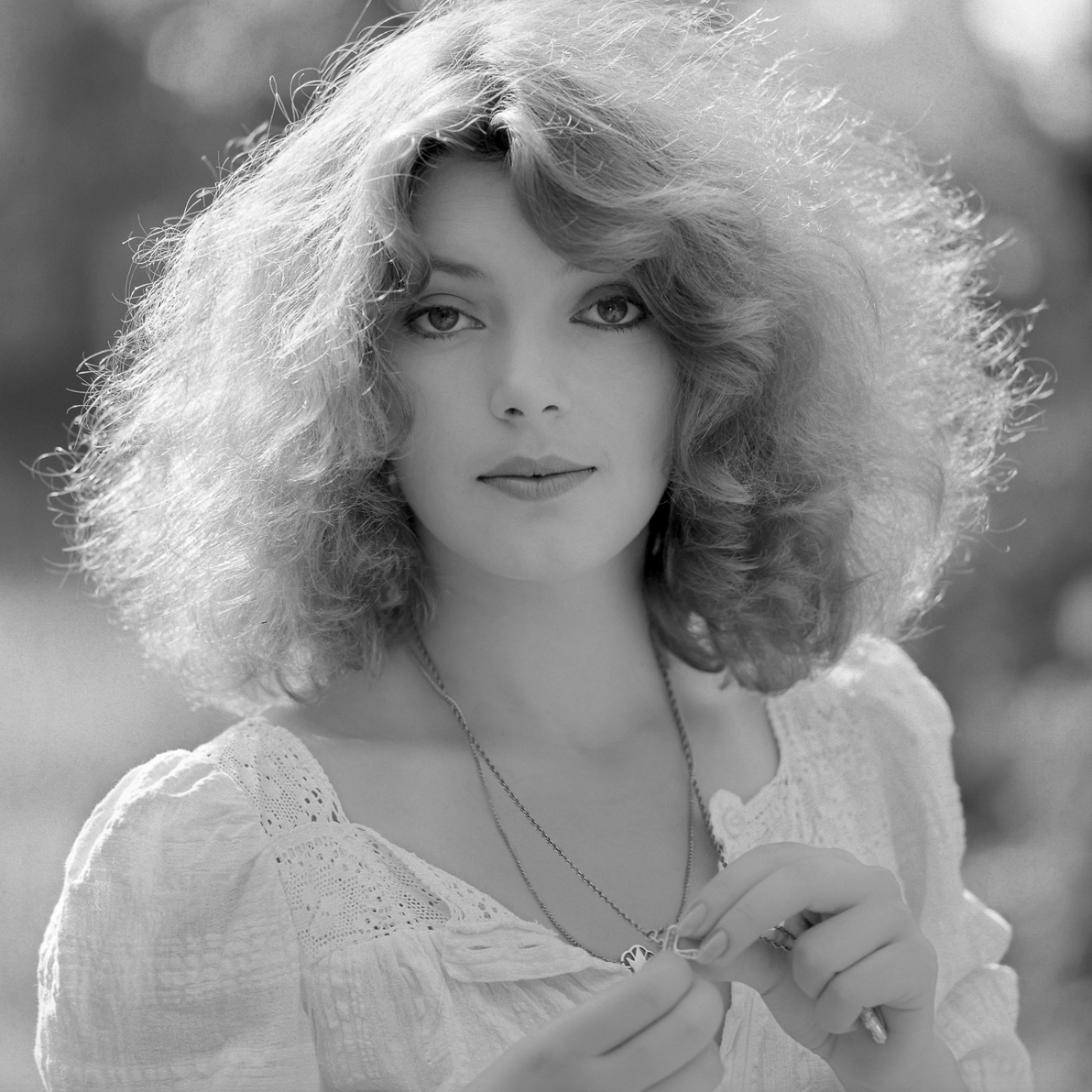
- Bošković in 1975
- Born: 27 June 1953 (age 72); Aranđelovac, PR Serbia, FPR Yugoslavia
- Occupation: Actress
- Years active: 1974–present

Tanja Bošković (Serbian Cyrillic: Тања Бошковић; born 27 June 1953) is a Serbian actress. She has performed in more than forty films since 1974.

== Selected filmography ==
Film
Year	Title	Role	Notes
2000	War Live		
1988	Manifesto	Olympia	
1983	Balkan Express	Lili	
1980	All That Jack's	Bosa	
1978	Occupation in 26 Pictures	Pina	

=== Television ===
Year	Title	Role	Notes
1993–1994	Srećni ljudi	Lola Golubović	25 episodes
2005–2008	Viza za budućnost	Sofija Jović	106 episodes
2007	Pozorište u kući	Snežana Nikolajević	26 episodes
2014	Otvorena vrata	Jadranka	1 episode
