= Zuzi Zu =

Background information
- Also known as: Zuzi Zu
- Born: Zumreta Midžić; Velika Kladuša, PR Bosnia and Herzegovina, FPR Yugoslavia
- Genres: Pop, Rock, Gypsy music, Sevdalinke
- Occupation: Musician
- Instruments: Vocals
- Years active: 1978–present
- Website: http://zuzizu.ba

Zumreta Midžić, known by her stage name Zuzi Zu, is a popular Bosnian singer, musician and songwriter. She performs various music genres from pop-rock to Bosnian folk - sevdalinka and Gypsy music. She was born in Velika Kladuša, Bosnia and Herzegovina and for many years she was living and working in Sarajevo and Zagreb.

== Biography ==
Zuzi Zu developed two parallel and separated : one was in economics and the other was in music. She graduated with Bachelor of Economics, from University of Sarajevo's Faculty of Economics. After the graduation she found employment in Government of Socialistic Republic of Bosnia and Herzegovina – Department for planning of economic development as an adviser for tourism and trade. She is continued her academic career and she granted at The Institute of Social Studies in The Hague, Netherlands.

At the same time she was studying economics, she also attended Sarajevo's Secondary Music School – Department of solo singing. She was also a member of the Choir of Radio Television of Sarajevo. Maestro Julio Marić, conductor of the Choir, selected her to sing backing vocals for the Festival "Vaš Šlager Sezone" in 1976 when songwriter Kemal Monteno won it with the famous song "Sarajevo, ljubavi moja". After that she participated as a backing vocalist, alongside young singer Gordana Ivandić in the Great Yugoslav Tour of "Indexi" and Zdravko Čolić. Later these two ladies formed disco duo "Rock Hotel" and released single "Disco/Blue jeans". After disintegration of "Rok Hotel" this duo joined male singer Mirza Alijagić and formed disco group "Mirzino jato". The period from 1979 to 1982, while she was a member of the group, was marked with some of the greatest Yugoslav disco hits such as "Apsolutno tvoj", "Normalna stvar", "Charter Flight" etc. In the midst of eighties she's began cooperation with "Bijelo dugme", the greatest rock group of former Yugoslavia. She sang backing vocals on the album "Pljuni i zapjevaj moja Jugoslavijo" and participated on subsequently eponymous Yugoslav Tour of the group.

During all these years Zuzi Zu's also performed old Bosnian folk songs called sevdalinka. Famous interpreter of sevdalinka Himzo Polovina supported her to record the first sevdalinka song "Moj beharu ko li mi te bere" for the Musical Production of Sarajevo's Radio and Television. Aftar that she recorded about 20 of sevdalinka with National and Tamburitza Orchestra RTV Sarajevo. With one of the most prominent and popular performers of the Bosnian traditional music sevdalinka Safet Isović and his Omer Pobrić Orchestra in the late '80s and early '90s she sang at concerts and parties in Bosnia, Germany and Austria.-

In the year 1991 she recorded her first solo album "Noćas ja ludujem". The author of all songs was Milić Vukašinović Mića famous composer of rock and folk songs.

Zuzi Zu and Željko Bebek during tour "Kad bi' bio Bijelo Dugme" 2008.

2005 in Zagreb she joined the band formed by Željko Bebek, Mladen Vojičić Tifa and Alen Islamović, the three former singers of "Bijelo dugme". Next four years under the name "Kad sam bio bijelo dugme" band was touring all-around Europe and countries of Balkan region.

Zuzi Zu was preparing nearly 5 years her second solo album. So far she recorded 18 songs: "Vatra", "Trepavica", "Čičak", "Plava banana", "San o ljubavi", "Ederlezi", "Ružica si bila", "Žena istoka", "Reanimacija", "Morska pjena", "Where Love Has Gone", "Dove l'amore", "Trag ljubavi", "Waar ben je gebleven", "Delija", "Lutka od gume", "Imal jada k'o kad akšam pada" and "Uspavanka".

The producer and executive producer of all audio recordings is Aleksandar Kobac. All songs were recorded, mixed and mastered in "Studio Kobac" in Belgrade in the period from 2009 to 2017.

The videos were directed and recorded by Dejan Miličević and "Invenio Films" by Dalibor Mrdić. The video animation for "Blue Banana" was created by animator Berin Tuzlić.

On the "Made in Sarajevo" CD, Zuzi Zu appears on most of the songs as a complete artist: performer, author of music and lyrics, and in videos as a stylist-costume designer.

She participated in the TV Pink reality of Farma 5 in 2013.

Zuzi Zu was also announced as part of the supporting stage team for Bosnia and Herzegovina in the performance at Eurovision 2016, but later withdrew her participation in the project.

== Filmography ==
Zuzi Zu sang in several Yugoslav films. The most important are these: The first one is the film "Nacionalna klasa" (National Class Category Up to 785 cm^{3}) by director Goran Marković. She performed back vocals in a main musical theme of the film named "Floyd" and she also sang a song named "Hoby" where punk for the first time was introduced in Yugoslav music. The author of all music was Zoran Simjanović.

The second one is the movie "Dom za vešanje"(Time of the Gypsies) by director Emir Kusturica. There she sings the backing vocals for the famous song "Ederlezi"(St. George's Day) that later became the trademark of the whole film.

== Discography ==
=== Solo albums ===
- 1991 Noćas ja ludujem (Sarajevo Disk)

=== As a member of a group Rock Hotel ===
- 1978 Disco/Blue Jeans (Jugoton)

=== As a member of a group Mirzino Jato ===
- 1979 Šećer i med (PGP RTB)
- 1979 Apsolutno tvoj, Pada sneg (Single) (PGP RTB)
- 1979 Normalna stvar (PGP RTB)
- 1980 Ja bih da me druga mazi / Zvezda i alkohol (Single) (PGP RTB)

=== As a backing vocalist ===
- 1984 Zašto tako strasno (Frano Lasić) (Jugodisk)
- 1986 Pljuni i zapjevaj moja Jugoslavijo (Bijelo Dugme) (Diskoton, Kamarad)
- 1987 Mramor, kamen i željezo (Bijelo Dugme) (Diskoton)
- 1987 Legija (Legija) (PGP RTB)
- 1990 Nakon svih ovih godina (Bijelo Dugme) (Diskoton)
- 1991 Rođena si samo za mene (Hari Mata Hari) (Diskoton)
- 2000 U ime ljubavi (Halid Bešlić) (In Takt records)
- 2000 Uzmi 1 Ili 2 (Fistik) (Song Zelex)
- 2004 Pljuni i zapjevaj moja Jugoslavijo (Bijelo Dugme) (Music Star Production)
- 2004 Mramor, kamen i željezo (Bijelo Dugme) (Music Star Production)
- 2005 Antologija 2 ('84 – '89) (Bijelo Dugme) (Not on Label)
- 2010 Mijenjam (Boban Rajović) (City records)

== Soundtrack movie albums ==
- 1979 Originalna muzika iz filma "Nacionalna klasa" (PGP RTB)
- 1988 Goran Bregović, Dom Za Vešanje (Muzika Iz Filma Emira Kusturice) (Diskoton, Kamarad)
- 1988 Goran Bregović, Dom Za Vešanje (Muzika Iz Filma Emira Kusturice) (Diskoton)
- 1994 Hoby (as Zumreta Midžić-Zuzi) Original Music Score From The Motion Picture National Class (Up To 785 CCM) (C&H Records)

== Videography ==
- 1992 Noćas ja ludujem (Tonight I'm fooling around), (director Milan Bilbija)
- 2010 Delija (The Hunk), (director Dejan Miličević)
- 2011 Ružica si bila (The Rose You Were), (director Dejan Miličević)
- 2012 Reanimacija (Reanimation), (director Dejan Miličević)
- 2012 Žena istoka (Oriental Woman), (director Dejan Miličević)
- 2012 Morska pjena (The Sea Foam), (director Dejan Miličević)
- 2013 Vatra (The Fire), (Invenio films)
- 2013 Where love has gone, (Invenio films)
- 2013 Trag ljubavi (The Trail of Love), (Invenio films)
- 2013 Dove l'Amore (Where is love?), (Invenio films)
- 2013 Waar ben je gebleven (Where are You?), (Invenio films)
- 2014 Ederlezi, (Invenio films)
- 2014 San o ljubavi, (Invenio films)
