= The Promising Boy =

- Serbo-Croatian: Dečko koji obećava
- Directed by: Miša Radivojević
- Written by: Nebojša Pajkić; Miša Radivojević; Bogdan Tirnanić
- Produced by: Ilija Milutinović; Mirjana Mijojlić
- Starring: Aleksandar Berček; Dara Džokić; Rade Marković; Bata Živojinović; Dušica Žegarac; Éva Darlan
- Cinematography: Božidar Nikolić
- Edited by: Vuksan Lukovac
- Music by: Koja
- Release date: 1981
- Running time: 106 minutes
- Country: SFR Yugoslavia
- Language: Serbo-Croatian

The Promising Boy (Serbo-Croatian: Dečko koji obećava) is a 1981 Yugoslav youth genre film. Overlapping with the emerging new wave scene that seemingly challenged many of the established social norms in communist Yugoslavia, the movie tells the story of a young man who goes from being a good son to rebellious misfit and back again.

It also served as showcase of sorts for various bands of Yugoslav new wave and punk music scenes.

== Plot ==
Twenty-four-year-old Slobodan Milošević (Aleksandar Berček) seemingly has the world by the tail. Growing up during the early 1980s in an upscale part of Belgrade as the only child in nomenklatura family—his father's a Yugoslav People's Army officer, mother a university professor—Slobodan is a young man. Studying at the University of Belgrade's Faculty of Medicine while dating Maša (Dara Džokić), daughter of a communist Serbian politician father (Bata Živojinović) and Slovenian mother (Milena Zupančič), Slobodan's a boyfriend and son to boot.

The opening scene has Slobodan listening to Russian bards and chansons on his stereo while respecting his parents' orders as Maša and her parents are coming over for a visit.

The two young lovebirds are having a traditional courtship, frequently socializing with the two sets of parents. Even when it comes to the young pair's sexual activity, Slobodan exercises restraint, insisting that the best place for sex is—a married couple's bed; Maša on the other hand is occasionally feeling adventurous, suggesting one night they do it in his yellow Volkswagen, the high school graduation gift from his parents. During the said sexual encounter, which Slobodan agrees to somewhat reluctantly, Maša informs him that on advice from her mother she has placed an intrauterine device in her genitalia as a contraceptive.

Driving around Belgrade in his car one morning, Slobodan picks up a female hitchhiker (Éva Darlan) who turns out to be a foreigner. Her name is Clavis and she's a French-speaking Swiss national from Zurich who's visiting Yugoslavia for a tour of Serbian medieval monasteries and frescoes. They hit it off in a playfully flirty conversation and arrange to meet again as he drops her off at Hotel Slavija where she's staying. Satisfied with the turn of events, Slobodan drives off listening to Paraf's "Perspektiva". Another day he takes her to various museums; they discuss art, history, Leni Riefenstahl, Jean-Luc Godard, avant-garde, etc. followed by going up to her hotel room where she fellates him to Azra's "Iggy Pop".

Out for a day at the Lido beach one afternoon with Maša and both their respective sets of parents, Slobodan has some tough explaining to do because Maša's friend saw him go in the hotel with the Swiss girl. Discovering a hickey on his neck serves as the ultimate proof of his infidelity for Maša and in a fit of anger she hits him on the head with a paddle. He losses consciousness momentarily, but when he comes to, with blood streaming down his face, dazed yet determined, he gets into Danube and swims across. Barefoot and disheveled with wet clothing, he impulsively runs all the way to Hotel Slavija in downtown Belgrade looking for Clavis, but is stopped and thrown out by the hotel security. Exhilarated rather than disappointed, Slobodan seems determined and ready for a major lifestyle change and marks this by going to the barber to get a haircut and shave off his bushy beard as Pekinška Patka's "Bolje da nosim kratku kosu" is playing in the shop.

This is just the beginning of Slobodan's extreme behavioural turnaround as the blow to his head seems to have caused a major change inside it. He stops coming home in favour of hanging out and crashing at other people's dorm rooms at Studentski Grad student residence, all of which alarms his parents and Maša who report him missing to the police. Following a fight at the dorm he's reduced to spending the night in a sleeping bag on benches at the train station. The police picks him up there, mistaking him for a vagrant or petty criminal; the inspector at the station calls his mother who comes to take him home. Once there, more antagonism awaits as his already agitated father completely loses it and gets physical upon seeing aloof Slobodan relieve himself in the bathroom sink with a devil-may-care attitude. Slobodan slaps him back with a stern and sarcastic: "Don't you ever do that again, daddy". The father throws him out of the house and on the way out Slobodan takes his own Volkswagen and drives off.

The young man's reckless behaviour continues as he shows up to Maša's apartment late one night, but gets informed by her mother that she had gone to Greece with her father for a holiday. Without missing a beat Slobodan puts the moves on his girlfriend's mother and soon ends up sleeping with her. The mature woman initially somewhat objects, but eventually submits herself gladly to the young man's physical advances. The next morning she makes him breakfast-in-bed, puts on a Bulat Okudzhava record, and initiates the "this can't continue" talk in motherly and patronizing tone to which he starts laughing hysterically before calling her a "menopausal whore whose daughter isn't much better" and leaving her angry and in tears. As he drives away, he pops in a tape in his car stereo with Šarlo Akrobata's "Niko kao ja" and starts masturbating before pulling over as he's about to climax. He soon sells the car in order to buy a motor bike.

Slobodan is also getting into the new wave music scene, watching bands at SKC. At the Igra staklenih perli gig, he picks up Ljubica who takes him back to her place where he forces her into giving him fellatio by slapping her face several times as Prljavo kazalište's "Neka te ništa ne brine" is blasting on her stereo. After sex she makes a suggestion that he form a band and promises to put him in touch with some people. To that end she takes him to a hipster party—as they enter the private apartment where the party takes place, the live band VIS Idoli are playing "Schwüle über Europa"—and introduces him to Pit who likes Slobodan's lyrics.
