= Otvorena vrata =

- Also known as: Open Doors
- Created by: Miloš Radović
- Starring: Vesna Trivalić; Bogdan Diklić; Milan Gutović; Bojana Maljević; Nikola Đuričko; Sofija Jović; Zoran Cvijanović; Anica Dobra (Seasons 3 and 4); Olivera Marković (Seasons 1 and 2)
- Opening theme: "Bez nas" by Momčilo Bajagić
- Countries of origin: FR Yugoslavia (Seasons 1 and 2); Serbia (Seasons 3 and 4)
- No. of seasons: 4
- No. of episodes: 60 (list of episodes)

Production
- Running time: 30 minutes

Original release
- Network: Radio Televizija Srbije (1994-1995); Prva Srpska Televizija (2013-2014)
- Release: November 25, 1994 – June 4, 2014

Otvorena vrata (Serbian Cyrillic: Отворена врата, lit. 'Open Doors'), is a Serbian comedy television series filmed in 1994-1995. Broadcast on state television RTS, it ran for 2 seasons (34 episodes in total) featuring a regular family living in Belgrade during the 1990s.

The show was created by Biljana Srbljanović and Miloš Radović and Jelena Brkic and Zika Mustikla, starring Vesna Trivalić, Milan Gutović, Bogdan Diklić, Nikola Đuričko, Sofija Jović, Bojana Maljević, Olivera Marković and Zoran Cvijanović, with guest stars such as: Mirjana Karanović, Nikola Simić, Seka Sablić, Branka Katić, Mira Stupica.

The show had many reruns over the following years, and acquired a cult following.

In spring of 2012, after the Serbian presidential election results were announced, Bojana Maljević announced on her Twitter account that she and Biljana Srbljanović were thinking about doing another season of the show. In the following days the idea of the third season was officially confirmed and members of the original cast started announcing that they would take part in the project.

== Plot ==
Katarina Anđelić, nicknamed "Cakana", lives in an apartment with her two children, her brother Bata, and his daughter. She is a sculptor and painter, but there are not many people who see her potential. Her ex-husband, Dragoslav, is trying to win her back after cheating on her earlier, which led to the breakup of the marriage.

== Cast ==
=== Main ===
- Vesna Trivalić as Katarina "Cakana" Anđelić
- Bogdan Diklić as Svetislav "Bata" Anđelić, Cakana's brother
- Milan Gutović as Dragoslav Jakovljević, Cakana's ex-husband
- Bojana Maljević as Ana Anđelić, Bata's daughter
- Nikola Đuričko as Vojislav "Vojkan/Voja" Jakovljević, Cakana and Dragoslav's older son
- Sofija Jović as Milica Jakovljević, Cakana and Dragoslav's younger daughter
- Olivera Marković as Angelina Savić, neighbour (Season 1 and 2)
- Zoran Cvijanović as Milorad Ugrinović, neighbour
- Teodora Jelisavčić as Keti, Milica's daughter (Season 3)
- Anica Dobra as Leta (Season 3)

=== Supporting/Recurring ===
- Vlasta Velisavljević as Tomislav Pavlović, Cakana and Bata's uncle
- Branimir Brstina as Konstantin de Sisti, Dragoslav's cousin
- Mira Stupica as Kristina Trobožić, Dragoslav's mother
- Branka Katić as Sandra "Ćora", Ana's friend
- Rastko Lupulović as Milan "Milanče" Jovanović, Ana's ex-boyfriend
- Branislav Lečić as Dr. Gazivoda, psychiatrist
- Milica Mihajlović as Anka Crnotravka, folk singer and neighbour

== Revival ==
In 2012, seventeen years after the show's original run, Bojana Maljević announced her interest in reviving the series. Later on, it was officially confirmed that a third season was in the making with all of the original cast reuniting.

In November 2012, it was announced that the original creators of the show, Biljana Srbljanović and Miloš Radović, will not take part in writing or production for the upcoming series. After the press started speculating for their reasons for leaving the show, Biljana said "Money is not a problem, the fee I was offered was more than enough." and added that she didn't want to get involved unless she could have complete creative control. Miloš decided not to comment on the issue, only saying "We didn't reach an agreement with the producers.".

== List of episodes ==
=== Season 1 ===
#	title	original air date	title translation
1.	"Moja porodica"	November 25, 1994	"My family"
2.	"Ja imam dete"	December 2, 1994	"I have a child"
3.	"Mama ima dečka"	December 9, 1994	"Mom has a boyfriend"
4.	"Nedelja je mamin 8. mart"	December 16, 1994	"Sunday is mom's 8th of March"
5.	"Psiho-drama"	December 23, 1994	"Psychodrama"
6.	"Slučaj misterioznog D"	December 30, 1994	"Case of mysterious D"
7.	"Konstantin de Sisti"	January 6, 1995	"Konstantin de Sisti"
8.	"Ja bih da se malo izblaziram do sutra"	January 13, 1995	"Etiquette in a day"
9.	"Ka Barbadosu punim jedrima"	January 20, 1995	"Barbados, full sail ahead"
10.	"Trinsi sistem"	January 27, 1995	"The TRINSI system"
11.	"Rtaći iz kićblona"	February 3, 1995	"The gang from the block"
12.	"Otac Teodor"	February 10, 1995	"Father Theodor"
13.	"Tajna crne ruke"	February 17, 1995	"The secret of the Black hand"
14.	"Bonjour, Madamme"	February 14, 1995	"Bonjour, Madamme"
15.	"Čekajući Batu"	March 3, 1995	"Waiting for Bata"
16.	"Vova"	March 10, 1995	"Vova"
17.	"Amnezija"	March 17, 1995	"Amnesia"
18.	"All You Need Is Love"	March 24, 1995	"All You Need Is Love"
19.	"Ujka Toma"	March 31, 1995	"Uncle Toma"
20.	"Tiha noć"	April 7, 1995	"Silent night"
21.	"Princ Aleksa"	April 14, 1995	"Aleksa, Prince Charming"
22.	"Čiji si ti, mali?"	April 21, 1995	"Who's your daddy?"
23.	"Teatromanija"	April 28, 1995	"Theatremania"

Original name for episode 22 is "Tri sudbonosna dana u životu Dragoslava Jakovljevića, zvanog Draganče, koji započinju mirno i naivno da bi zadobili iznenadan i neočekivan obrt ili Čiji si ti, mali?".

=== Season 2 ===
#	title	original air date	title translation
1.	"Mašina dvaesprvog veka"	May 5, 1995	"21st Century machine"
2.	"Tajni agent 007"	May 12, 1995	"Secret agent 007"
3.	"Antoan"	May 19, 1995	"Antoan"
4.	"Deda"	May 26, 1995	"Granddad"
5.	"Veterinar"	June 2, 1995	"The Vet"
6.	"Lovac"	June 9, 1995	"The hunter"
7.	"Orkestar"	June 16, 1995	"The Orchestra"
8.	"Muva za Tokio"	June 23, 1995	"A Fly for Tokyo"
9.	"Bebe"	June 30, 1995	"Babies"
10.	"Kristijan Žu protiv Tanaska Rajića"	July 7, 1995	"Chrisian zu VS Tanasko Rajić"
11.	"Slava"	July 14, 1995	"Slava"

=== Season 3 ===
Actress Bojana Maljević revealed some details of the third season saying that the series will feature all of the original cast and that the storyline will skip ahead from where they left at the end of the second season.

#	title	original air date	title translation
1.	"Rođendan"	April 22, 2013	"The Birthday"
2.	"Ne čuje baba, sine"	April 29, 2013	"Grandmother Can't Hear You, Darling"
3.	"Diploma"	May 6, 2013	"Diploma"
4.	"Izbori"	May 13, 2013	"Elections"
5.	"Obuka"	May 20, 2013	"Training"
6.	"Kuća zatvorenih vrata"	May 27, 2013	"Closed Door House"
7.	"NGOizacija"	September 25, 2013	"NGOisation"
8.	"Žurka"	October 2, 2013	"Party"
9.	"Grešne duše"	October 9, 2013	"Sinful Souls"
10.	"Elita"	September 16, 2013	"Elite"
11.	"Žitije Ankino"	October 23, 2013	"Anka's Hagiography"
12.	"Keva"	October 30, 2013	"Mamma"
13.	"Feng šui"	November 6, 2013	"Feng Shui"
14.	"Nema nama spasa"	November 13, 2013	"No Hope for Us"
15.	"Potvrda"	November 20, 2013	"Confirmation"
16.	"Pobuna"	November 27, 2013	"Rebels"

=== Season 4 ===
#	title	original air date	title translation
1.	"Idoli"	March 26, 2014	"Idols"
2.	"Subverzija"	April 2, 2014	"Subversion"
3.	"Majka Hrabrost"	April 9, 2014	"Mother Courage"
4.	"Intervju"	April 16, 2014	"Interview"
5.	"Parakulturne formacije"	April 23, 2014	"Paracultural Formations"
6.	"Komandante Drag-Če"	April 30, 2014	"Commander Drag-Che"
7.	"Halo beba"	May 7, 2014	"Hello Baby"
8.	"Dvojke"	May 14, 2014	"Twins"
9.	"Krivosuđe"	May 21, 2014	"Miscarriage of Justice"
10.	"Pravda za Voju"	June 4, 2014	"Justice for Voja"
