= Variola Vera =

1982 Yugoslav film

- Directed by: Goran Marković
- Written by: Goran Marković; Milan Nikolić
- Produced by: Aleksandar Stojanović
- Starring: Rade Šerbedžija, Erland Josephson, Rade Marković
- Music by: Zoran Simjanović
- Distributed by: Art Film 80; Croatia Film
- Release date: 9 July 1982 (Yugoslavia)
- Running time: 110 minutes
- Country: Yugoslavia
- Language: Serbo-Croatian

Variola Vera (Cyrillic: Вариола вера) is a 1982 Yugoslav film directed by Goran Marković. Due to its subject matter and tone, the film is often described as horror.

The film is a satirical dramatization of the 1972 Yugoslav smallpox outbreak, which was the last outbreak on European territory. It comments on the corruption of medical professionals and government officials.

== Plot ==
An Albanian Muslim pilgrim returns to Yugoslavia from Saudi Arabia infected with an unknown disease. He is moved from Kosovo to a hospital in Belgrade, where his symptoms worsen and eventually lead to his death. By the time hospital officials realize he was infected with smallpox, which they had trouble identifying due to the belief that the disease had been eradicated, it is already too late.

The disease spreads as the disorganised staff attempt to isolate the infected. An epidemiologist arrives to assist doctors and function as a means of communication between the now quarantined hospital and the outside world.

The film follows the behaviour of numerous groups of people, including patients at the hospital, medical staff, ordinary citizens and government officials, commenting largely on the corruption and cowardice of politicians and high-ranking medical staff (such as Superintendent Čole, who locks himself in his office and steals medicine), but also displaying the humanity and self-sacrifice of the medical staff in times of crisis.

Twenty-one days pass after the final case is documented, and the hospital is officially declared smallpox-free. The quarantine is lifted and government officials announce that the disease has once again been eradicated.

== Cast ==
- Rade Šerbedžija as Dr. Grujić
- Erland Josephson as Dr. Dragutin Majcan Kenigsmark (Dubbed by Petar Kralj)
- Dušica Žegarac as Dr. Marković
- Varja Đukić as Dr. Danka Uskoković
- Rade Marković as Superintendent Čole
- Vladislava Milosavljević as Nurse Slavica
- Peter Carsten as UN Epidemiologist (Dubbed by Mihajlo Viktorović)
- Aleksandar Berček as Magistar Jovanović
- Radmila Živković as Nurse Zaga
- Semka Sokolović-Bertok as Dr. Ćirić
- Bogdan Diklić as Duško
- Velimir Životić as Government Minister
- Milo Miranović as Stoker Mile
- Džemail Makšut as Halil Redžepi
- Katica Želi as Cleaner
- Bogosava Nikšić as Employee at Reception Desk
- Ratko Tankosić as Bora
- Slobodan Aligrudić as Vlada
- Svetolik Nikačević as Academic Kostić
- Dušan Bulajić as Serviceman
- Toma Kuruzović as Hospital Chauffeur
- Minja Vojvodić as JAT Official
- Vladan Živković
- Strahinja Mojić

== Background and production ==
In a 2012 interview, director Goran Marković said about the film:

Even as a student, I was obsessed with the idea of making an adaptation of Albert Camus' The Plague. That novel left a strong impression on me in my early youth. Later, during my studies, I realized that the real theme of the novel is not the disease, but the moral discourse between the individual and the 'dark force'. When I experienced the arrival of Soviet tanks into Prague in 1968, which also meant the complete loss of illusions about the possibility of living in a just world, I decided to make a film that would somehow oppose that dark force. The plague seemed to me the best frame for the story. But at the time no one wanted to finance such a film, for understandable reasons, and since then we had a smallpox epidemic in 1972, after which I realized that it would be better to deal with our own reality, and not some kind of literary one. Variola Vera is absolutely the most difficult project I've ever filmed. There was always something standing in its way. I've spent months preparing to shoot in one hospital, only to be given another, completely different hospital some one-two days before the shooting. 'Take it or leave it', was the dilemma. Soon the set designer left me, and the shooting itself took place in complete poverty. We worked 14-16 hours a day. I was completely exhausted, both physically and morally.

Variola Vera was filmed at the Clinic for Plastic Surgery and Burns, near the Partizan Stadium in Belgrade. The music and sound effects, which are a prominent feature of the film, were composed by Zoran Simjanović.

== Accolades ==
The film garnered Marković the first prize for Best Director and the Best Screenplay at the 1982 Valencia Film Festival. It received the Golden Arena for Best Costume Design at the 1982 Pula Film Festival.

== Legacy ==
A poll of 30 Yugoslav critics and journalists conducted in the newspaper Oslobođenje named Variola Vera the best Yugoslav Film of 1982.

The Yugoslav Film Archive, in accordance with its authorities based on the Law on Cultural Heritage, declared one hundred Serbian feature films (1911–1999) as cultural heritage of great importance on December 28, 2016. Variola Vera is also on that list.
