= Falsifier =

- Film poster
- Фалсификатор
- Directed by: Goran Marković
- Starring: Tihomir Stanić; Branka Katić
- Music by: Zoran Simjanović
- Release date: 3 March 2013 (BFF)
- Running time: 90 minutes
- Country: Serbia
- Language: Serbian

Falsifier (Serbian: Фалсификатор; transliteration: Falsifikator) is a 2013 Serbian comedy film directed by Goran Marković. The film is produced by Drina, Balkan Film, Kozarske Dubice, and Radio-Television of the Republic of Srpska, and co-produced by Sarajevo

== Plot ==
The story of this movie began in 1968, at the end of the era of communism. Its main character, Junak Anjelko, is a firm believer in Yugoslavia and immeasurably obeys the will of its “owner”, Joseph Broz. And as a falsifier himself, Anjelko never knew from his own people the land that was rightly restored and touched upon by the wrong topics. Anjelka, however, cannot think or plan, nor can she commit any sin in that ideal light. He himself is well fed by that perfect light, he has a diploma. For this sake, without reward and from a pure heart, he must be resigned."

== Cast ==
- Tihomir Stanić as Andjelko
- Branka Katić as Mirjana
- Dušan Plavšić as Slobodan
- Sergej Trifunović as Enes
- Goran Navojec as Kangrga
- Emir Hadžihafizbegović as Suljo
