= Boris Komnenić =

Serbian actor (1957–2021)

- Борис Комненић
- Born: 29 March 1957; Pula, PR Croatia, FPR Yugoslavia
- Died: 6 March 2021 (aged 63); Belgrade, Serbia
- Education: Faculty of Dramatic Arts
- Alma mater: University of Arts in Belgrade
- Occupation: Actor
- Years active: 1980–2021

Boris Komnenić (Serbian Cyrillic: Борис Комненић; 29 March 1957 – 6 March 2021) was a Serbian actor. He appeared in more than sixty films from 1980 onwards and a number of theatre roles.

Komnenić died on 6 March 2021 in Belgrade, aged 63.

== Selected filmography ==
Year	Title	Role	Notes
1980	Days of Dreams		
1985	Taiwan Canasta	Saša Belopoljanski	
1986	Dancing in Water	Veslač Partizana I	
1987	The Misfit Brigade	Bauer	
2009	The Belgrade Phantom		
2006	Seven and a Half	Radoje	
2004	When I Grow Up, I'll Be a Kangaroo	The doctor	
2003	Loving Glances	Professor Jablan	
2002	Novogodišnje venčanje	Zoran (Nikola and Nada's brother)	
2002	T.T. Syndrome	Magistar Đorđević	
