= The Marathon Family =

The Marathon Family (Maratonci trče počasni krug)
- Directed by: Slobodan Šijan
- Written by: Dušan Kovačević (play and screenplay)
- Produced by: Milan Zmukić
- Starring: Bogdan Diklić; Bata Stojković; Pavle Vujisić; Mija Aleksić; Milivoje Tomić; Zoran Radmilović; Seka Sablić; Bora Todorović
- Cinematography: Božidar Nikolić
- Edited by: Lana Vukobratović
- Music by: Zoran Simjanović
- Distributed by: Centar Film
- Release date: March 4, 1982
- Running time: 92 minutes
- Country: Yugoslavia
- Language: Serbian

The Marathon Family (Serbian: Маратонци трче почасни круг / Maratonci trče počasni krug, lit. Marathon Runners Do a Lap of Honour, or often simply Maratonci, lit. The Marathon Runners) is a 1982 Yugoslav black comedy film written by Dušan Kovačević and directed by Serbian director Slobodan Šijan. It has become a cult film in Serbia and other countries from the territory of the former Yugoslavia and is regarded as one of the classics of Yugoslav Serbian cinematography.

The film depicts a family of undertakers with a dark secret. Instead of making coffins, they steal ones from graves in the cemetery. They are increasingly indebted to a local hoodlum for his services. Following the death of the head of the family, conflict begins between the family and the hoodlum. The youngest member of the family kills his cheating girlfriend in a jealous rage, and then claims the family's leadership for himself. His term in office starts with a brutal showdown with the hoodlum and a police chase.

== Plot ==
The story takes place in an unnamed small Serbian town in 1935, and focuses on the Topalović family, consisting of six generations of undertakers:

- gravely ill Pantelija, who founded the business a century ago,
- Maksimilijan who uses a wheelchair, is mute and nearly deaf,
- rheumatic Aksentije,
- sober-minded Milutin,
- impulsive and narcissistic Laki, and
- young and naive Mirko.

Constantly bickering, the latest family argument arises from the youngest son, Mirko, not wanting to continue the family business of coffin-making. Deeply in love with Kristina, the daughter of a local hoodlum, Bili Piton (Billy the Python), he's looking to avoid the career of his father, grandfather, great grandfather, etc.

Though operating out of a prominently located shop in the town, the Topalovićs' business is mostly based on illegal activities. Instead of making coffins, they recycle used ones with the help of Piton, whose men have been digging them out from the local cemetery during the night for 20 years. The Topalovićs refurbish them and sell them as new, making a large profit given the minimal overhead. Although based on mutual financial interest, the relationship between the Topalovićs and Bili is deteriorating as they owe him money for his services and show little intention of paying him. In parallel, the Topalovićs are in the finishing stages of building a modern crematorium on which they are placing high hopes as the future source of income.

One day, Pantelija dies and leaves the family inheritance to himself because he does not trust his successors. Piton demands his money and threatens to report them to the police for accidentally running down and killing a man, but Mirko has stolen the family funds. Kristina has been persuaded to act in an erotic movie made by Mirko's friend, Đenka, who she has a secret relationship with and who runs the local cinema where she worked as a piano accompanist for silent movies before the advent of sound. Mirko catches them naked together and chokes her in a jealous rage.

Mirko returns to his family and makes himself their leader by force, while Đenka is accidentally burned to death by the deaf Maksimilijan who turns on the crematorium while Đenka is repairing it. The Topalovićs and Piton's gang raid each other's houses simultaneously, with both being set on fire. The movie ends with a shootout between the Topalovićs and Piton's gang, in which Piton is killed, and then the Topalovićs breaking through a police cordon.

== Cast ==
- Bogdan Diklić as Mirko Topalović
- Bata Stojković as Laki Topalović
- Pavle Vujisić as Milutin Topalović
- Mija Aleksić as Aksentije Topalović
- Milivoje Tomić as Maksimilijan Topalović
- Radislav Lazarević as Pantelija Topalović
- Zoran Radmilović as Billy the Python (Bili Piton)
- Seka Sablić as Kristina
- Bora Todorović as Đenka
- Melita Bihali as Olja the maid
- Fahro Konjhodžić as Mr Rajković
- Veljko Mandić as Rajković's brother
- Bata Paskaljević as Older gendarme
- Dragoljub-Gula Milosavljević as Mourner (as Dragoljub Milosavljević)
- Miroslav Jovanović as 1st Twin
- Dragoslav Jovanović as 2nd Twin
- Milovan Tasić as The Giant
- Milan Janjić as Midget
- Ras Rastoder as Younger gendarme
- Stanojlo Milinković as Villager
- Vojislav Micović as Old man at cemetery
- Nebojša Terzić as Priest Đura
- Nikola Brodac as Deceased

== Awards ==
The Marathon Family won two awards in 1982, including the Jury Prize at the Montréal World Film Festival and the "Best Actress" award at the Pula Film Festival, which went to Seka Sablić for her portrayal of Kristina.

== See also ==
- List of Yugoslavian films
