= Midwinter Night's Dream =

2004 film

- Directed by: Goran Paskaljevic
- Written by: Filip David; Goran Paskaljevic
- Produced by: José María Morales; Goran Paskaljevic; Lazar Ristovski; Philip Zepter
- Cinematography: Milan Spasic
- Edited by: Petar Putnikovic
- Music by: Zoran Simjanović
- Production companies: Nova Film; Zepter International; Zillion Film; Wanda Visión S.A.
- Distributed by: Eurozoom; Filmoptimistene; IFA; Cameo Media; Yleisradio (YLE) (2007) (Finland) (TV)
- Release date: 2004
- Running time: 95 minutes
- Language: Serbian

Midwinter Night's Dream (Serbian: Сан зимске ноћи, romanized: San zimske noći) is a 2004 Serbian drama film directed by Goran Paskaljevic. It is an allegory of the Yugoslav wars, starring an autistic child as the main character.

When first released in Serbia, it caused some public outrage because of the sharp criticism of Serbia's role in the war.

It was selected as the Serbian entry for the Best Foreign Language Film at the 78th Academy Awards, but it was not nominated.

== Cast ==
- Lazar Ristovski as Lazar
- Jasna Žalica as Jasna
- Jovana Mitic as Jovana

== See also ==
- List of submissions to the 78th Academy Awards for Best Foreign Language Film
- List of Serbian submissions for the Academy Award for Best International Feature Film
