= Virdžina =

- Directed by: Srđan Karanović
- Written by: Srđan Karanović
- Produced by: Đorđe Milojević; Rajko Grlić; Mladen Koceić; Čedomir Kolar; Lodi Osard
- Starring: Marta Keler; Miodrag Krivokapić
- Edited by: Branka Čeperac
- Music by: Zoran Simjanović
- Production companies: Centar film Beograd; Maestro film Zagreb; RTS Beograd; Constellacion Productions; UGC Images
- Release date: 5 April 1991
- Running time: 101 min.
- Country: Yugoslavia
- Language: Serbo-Croatian

Virgina (Serbo-Croatian: Virdžina, Serbian Cyrillic: Вирџина) is a 1991 Yugoslav drama film directed by Srđan Karanović.

== Plot ==
The action of the film takes place at the end of the 19th century, in a remote village of Kninska Krajina. At that time, it was the province of Dalmatia in the Austro-Hungarian Empire.

Families without male offspring were considered cursed and doomed. In order to save from the curses, those families declared one of the female children a "virgin", i.e. man, hiding the truth as a family secret. The film follows the story of one such family. The film begins with the birth of another girl in a family that, as they say, was not lucky enough to have male children. The girl's father Timotije, who carries a gun almost the entire time in the film, takes his daughter to a field to kill her, but takes pity and decides to raise her as a boy. So Timotije, the head of his family, decided that his youngest daughter should become a virgin named Stevan. A girl grows up like a boy, accustomed from the first steps to nullify everything feminine in her. But when she enters her girlhood, she end up falling in love with a man.

"Stevan" shows his will to be something else when he avoids his fiancee, when he is attracted to Mijat, and when he wants to play with his sister's doll. The doll is the antithesis of the gun: although Stevan's mother keeps pushing the gun into Stevan's hands, she steals her sister's doll, hides it, and even lies that she didn't take it. In one scene Mijat suggests that he and "Stevan" pee together and measure whose penis is bigger. After "Stevan" refuses, his sister mocks him: "Piss if you're a man." After that, a scene is shown where "Stevan" runs out of the yard and urinates in a crouching position.

At the end of the film, Stevan breaks his vow and runs away with Mijat to the United States, daring to escape the patriarchal oppression to which sworn virgins are exposed.

== Cast ==
- Marta Keler as Stevan
- Miodrag Krivokapić as Timotije
- Ina Gogalova as Dostana
- Slobodan Milovanović as Paun
- Mirko Vlahović as Young Man
- Matija Prskalo as Oldest Sister
- Vjenceslav Kapural as Josip
- Nada Gačešić-Livaković as Ranka
- Andrijana Videnović as Laura

== Awards ==
- In 1991, the film received the award for the best screenplay at the Film Screenplay Festival in Vrnjačka Banja.
- For the role of Stevan, Marta Keler received the European Film Academy Award (Felix) for best supporting role.
- Niš 91'
1. Emperor Constantine, 1st prize for the leading male role to Miodrag Krivokapić
2. Award to Ina Gogalova for her debut role
- Bitolj 91' - Golden plaque for camerawork

== Legacy ==
The Yugoslav Film Archive, in accordance with its authorities based on the Law on Cultural Heritage, declared one hundred Serbian feature films (1911-1999) as cultural heritage of great importance on December 28, 2016. Virdžina is also on that list.
