= Balkan Ekspres =

- Directed by: Branko Baletić
- Written by: Gordan Mihić
- Produced by: Art film (Belgrade); Inex Film (Belgrade)
- Starring: Dragan Nikolić; Bora Todorović; Tanja Bošković; Bata Živojinović; Olivera Marković
- Cinematography: Vladislav Lašić
- Edited by: Vuksan Lukovac
- Music by: Zoran Simjanović
- Release date: 1983
- Running time: 102 minutes
- Language: Serbo-Croatian

Balkan Express (Serbian: Балкан експрес) is a 1983 Yugoslavian film by director Branko Baletić.

== Cast ==
- Dragan Nikolić as Popaj
- Bora Todorović as Pik
- Tanja Bošković as Lili
- Bata Živojinović as Stojčić
- Olivera Marković as Aunt
- Radko Polič as Captain Dietrich
- Toma Zdravković as the singer
- Branko Cvejić as Kostica
- Bogdan Diklić as Ernest
- Ratko Tankosić as the waiter
- Predrag Miletić as Gerd
- Milan Erak as Boško
- Gojko Baletić as kelner
- Hajdana Baletić as Lea
- Milo Miranović as Agent
- Bata Kameni as German soldier

== See also ==
- List of Yugoslavian films
