= Grlom u jagode =

- Created by: Srđan Karanović
- Starring: Branko Cvejić; Bata Stojković; Olivera Marković; Rahela Ferari; Gordana Marić; Miki Manojlović; Aleksandar Berček; Bogdan Diklić; Đurđija Cvetić
- Theme music composer: Zoran Simjanović
- Country of origin: SFR Yugoslavia
- Original language: Serbo-Croatian
- No. of seasons: 1
- No. of episodes: 10

Production
- Running time: 45-55 minutes

Original release
- Network: TV Belgrade
- Release: August 4 – October 6, 1976

Grlom u jagode (Cyrillic: Грлом у јагоде, "The Unpicked Strawberries") is a 1976 Yugoslavian television series directed by Srđan Karanović, and co-written by Karanović and Rajko Grlić. Depicting the life and times of a young man nicknamed Bane Bumbar, the series achieved huge popularity throughout SFR Yugoslavia.

Revolving around Bane, his family, and his circle of friends, the series also portrays 1960s Belgrade, Serbia and Yugoslavia.

== Overview ==
Bane Bumbar is growing up in Stara Karaburma neighbourhood with his parents Sreta and Olja, his half-sister Seka Štajn (his mother's child form a previous marriage) and his maternal grandmother Elvira.

His social circle includes Miki Rubiroza, Glupi Uške, Boca Čombe, as well as his off-and-on girlfriend Goca.

Occasionally narrated by Bane and other characters from a distance of ten to fifteen years, each one of Grlom u jagode's 10 episodes depicts a different year from 1960 to 1969, inclusive, with Bane's various endeavours, general concerns, academic issues, love life, etc. being the focus of each particular episode.

=== Main characters ===
- Bane Bumbar is a city kid growing up in post-war Belgrade, the capital of communist Yugoslavia. Born Branislav Živković to parents Sreta and Olja, both of whom fought in the World War II on the Partisan side, his birth date is in 1945, couple of days before the war officially ended.

== Episodes ==
| No. | Title | Directed by | Written by | Original release date |
|---|---|---|---|---|
| 1 | "Stav prema glavi" | Srđan Karanović | Rajko Grlić, Srđan Karanović | March 25, 1976 |
| 2 | "Život piše romane" | Srđan Karanović | Rajko Grlić | April 1, 1976 |
| 3 | "Put u Rio" | Srđan Karanović | Rajko Grlić, Srđan Karanović | April 8, 1976 |
| 4 | "Okretne igre" | Srđan Karanović | Rajko Grlić, Srđan Karanović | April 15, 1976 |
| 5 | "One stvari" | Srđan Karanović | Rajko Grlić, Srđan Karanović | April 22, 1976 |
| 6 | "Spoljni izgled" | Srđan Karanović | Rajko Grlić, Srđan Karanović | April 29, 1976 |
| 7 | "Nervoza srca" | Srđan Karanović | Rajko Grlić, Srđan Karanović | May 6, 1976 |
| 8 | "Časovi vožnje" | Srđan Karanović | Rajko Grlić, Srđan Karanović | May 13, 1976 |
| 9 | "Glava ili pismo" | Srđan Karanović | Rajko Grlić, Srđan Karanović | May 20, 1976 |
| 10 | "Dim iz dimnjaka" | Srđan Karanović | Rajko Grlić, Srđan Karanović | May 27, 1976 |
