= Tito and Me =

1992 Serbian film

Tito and me
- Тито и ја Tito i ja
- Directed by: Goran Marković
- Written by: Goran Marković
- Produced by: Goran Marković; Zoran Masirević; Michel Mavros; Zoran Tasić
- Starring: Dimitrije Vojnov; Lazar Ristovski; Miki Manojlović; Anica Dobra; Voja Brajović; Bogdan Diklić
- Cinematography: Radoslav Vladić
- Edited by: Snežana Ivanović
- Music by: Zoran Simjanović
- Distributed by: Kino International
- Release date: 1992
- Running time: 104 min. (United States); 118 min. (Canada)
- Countries: Serbia and Montenegro; France
- Language: Serbo-Croatian

Tito and Me (Serbo-Croatian: Tito i ja, Serbian Cyrillic: Тито и ја) is a 1992 comedy film by Serbian director Goran Marković.

== Plot ==
The movie is set in socialist Yugoslavia during the 1950s. Zoran is an overweight 10-year-old living in an overcrowded home that his parents share with his aunt, uncle and grandmother. In the early communist era of Yugoslavia, many homes were taken away from their owners in the Land Reform programs. Zoran's parents are both artists, a pianist and a ballerina, and they do not get along well with his aunt and uncle.

Zoran's parents are sceptical about Josip Broz Tito's rule, while little Zoran sees Tito as his personal hero. He's learned in school that Tito is the greatest man to have ever lived, and he daydreams about meeting him. Zoran's father expresses worry that Zoran loves Tito more than his own parents. One day, Zoran writes a poem titled "Why I Like the President", which is judged as the best of those submitted by Belgrade's schoolchildren to a writing contest. He wins a week's camping trip with other children from families favored by the regime, the trip's highlight being a reception at Tito's palace. His crush, an older orphan girl named Jasna, is also going on this trip.

The camping trip is led by a ruthless party member named Raja. From the very start, a rivalry evolves between Raja and Zoran. Raja and others often make fun of Zoran's weight and appearance, but Zoran remains unfazed. He still daydreams about meeting Tito, but is also preoccupied by his wish to make Jasna like him. During a break from the group's walk, Zoran sees one of the older boys, Kengur (kangaroo, a nickname given to him because of his height), kiss Jasna and he becomes upset. The trip becomes increasingly absurd and culminates in Raja and Kengur pretending to be ghosts and scaring the younger children while they spend the night at a historic castle.

Zoran is exposed by Raja for stealing a ring he wanted to give to Jasna. Raja orders for him to be sent home by train, and as Zoran waits, a girl walks over to his side. All of the students join him, leaving only Raja opposing them, and it is decided that Zoran will continue the trip. They finish the journey and arrive at Tito's childhood home, and Zoran is asked to give a speech. He corrects his poem by saying that he in fact does love his parents more than Tito, and finally states that he doesn't even like Tito that much.

The film ends with a banquet where all of the children get to meet Tito, but Zoran is disillusioned and doesn't really care to meet him anymore. While the other kids gather in the reception room, he sneaks over to a buffet and enjoys the food.

== Cast ==
- Dimitrije Vojnov as Zoran
- Anica Dobra as Zoran's mother
- Miki Manojlović as Zoran's father
- Olivera Marković as Zoran's grandmother
- Rade Marković as Zoran's grandfather
- Bogdan Diklić as Zoran's uncle
- Ljiljana Dragutinović as Zoran's aunt
- Voja Brajović as Josip Broz Tito
- Lazar Ristovski as Raja
- Branimir Brstina as Strahinja
- Milutin Dapčević as Kengur
- Milena Vukosav as Jasna
- Nebojša Dugalić as policeman
- Jelena Mrdak as Ljilja
- Dragan Nikolić as Gane's father
- Uroš Nikolić as Đura
- Olja Bećković as Đura's mother
- Milivoje Tomić as curator
- Miodrag Tomović as Tito's adjutant
- Vesna Trivalić as teacher
- Jelena Živković as Svetlana
- Žarko Laušević as Borko
- Ilija Bašić as agent no. 1
- Dušan Jakšić as agent no. 2
- Tamara Vučković as singer in bar

== Production ==
Scenes depicting Hrvatsko Zagorje were filmed on Fruška Gora, in Serbia, because the Croatian War of Independence had already started when the filming took place.

== Awards ==
- Silver Seashell for best director: Goran Marković (1992)
- Silver Seashell for juvenile acting: Dimitrije Vojnov (1992)

== Legacy ==
The Yugoslav Film Archive, in accordance with its authorities based on the Law on Cultural Heritage, declared one hundred Serbian feature films (1911–1999) as cultural heritage of great importance on December 28, 2016. Tito and Me is also on that list.

== See also ==
- Yugoslav films
