= The Tour (film) =

- Directed by: Goran Marković
- Starring: Tihomir Stanić; Jelena Đokić; Dragan Nikolić
- Music by: Zoran Simjanović
- Release dates: August 30, 2008 (Montréal World Film Festival); October 8, 2008 (Serbia)
- Running time: 114 minutes
- Country: Serbia
- Language: Serbian
- Box office: $104,256

The Tour (Serbian: Turneja, Турнеја) is a 2008 Serbian film directed by Goran Marković. It was Serbia's official submission for the 2009 Academy Award for Best Foreign Language Film, but was not nominated.

== Plot ==
In December 1993, as the Bosnian War rages, Stanislav, an actor living in Belgrade, convinces members of a theater troupe to perform with him at the front lines. Desperate for money, the troupe, consisting of Miško, Sonja, Zaki, Lale, and Jadranka, accept the offer.

The troupe arrives at Srbobran (before and after the war known as Donji Vakuf), a town close to the front lines and occupied by the Army of Republika Srpska. The troupe puts on a satirical comedy performance which is booed. The local commander pressures them to hand over their earnings to a local Serb charity, and to stage a Serbian nationalist performance at the forward front-line to boost morale. This performance ends disastrously when Lale is beaten up by drunken soldiers. Fed up with Stanislav over his false promises, the troupe decides to leave early but cannot locate their driver, Djuro. They trek through the surrounding combat zone looking for transportation, traversing a minefield in the process, but are captured by HVO militiamen. Sonja, a Croatian Serb, tries to fool the soldiers into thinking they are Croats by performing a scene from a Croatian nationalist piece, but their commander sees through their ruse. As the Croatian troops prepare to force them back across the minefield, a Serbian paramilitary unit (obvious reference to Arkan's Tigers) surrounds and captures the Croats. The troupe is forced to watch helplessly as the paramilitary commander (himself a devout fan of the actors) forces the captured soldiers to march to their deaths in the minefield. Back at the town, Misko encounters and old friend from Belgrade, Ljubić. Ljubić offers to bring them along with him back to Belgrade the following day, and even provides them with accommodation at the local hotel. They are unceremoniously thrown out after a drunken Zaki insults the wife of the hotelier, Danilo. The troupe spend the night in Djuro's bus. The next day, Ljubić, working as a propagandist, informs them that he must first deliver a speech to troops in Derventa. En route, Lale accosts Ljubić for espousing nationalist rhetoric, and tells him that the whole world recognizes the actions of the Serbs as evil. A scuffle ensues when Lale calls Ljubić a fascist, and Djuro loses control of the bus, which crashes in the middle of the forest. As they ponder their next move, they are surrounded by ARBiH soldiers. Ljubić is taken away to his presumed execution after the commander recognizes him from a nationalist speech he gave on television. After Jadranka performs a compelling monologue, the commander releases them. The troupe finally return to Belgrade. They try to relax and enjoy a group dinner in their theater, but the awkward and unpleasant atmosphere remains.

== Cast ==
- Tihomir Stanić - Stanislav
- Jelena Đokić - Jadranka
- Dragan Nikolić - Miško
- Mira Furlan - Sonja
- Josif Tatić - Zaki
- Gordan Kičić - Lale
- Slavko Štimac - Đuro
- Vojislav Brajović - Ljubić
- Sergej Trifunović - Leader of "Arkan's Tigers", a Serb paramilitary commander
- Emir Hadžihafizbegović - Danilo
- Svetozar Cvetković - Hirurg (surgeon)
- Branimir Popović - Bosniak commander
- Bogdan Diklić - ZNG commander
- Senad Bašić - General

== See also ==
- List of submissions to the 81st Academy Awards for Best Foreign Language Film
- List of Serbian submissions for the Academy Award for Best Foreign Language Film
