= Seka Sablić =

Serbian actress

- Сека Саблић
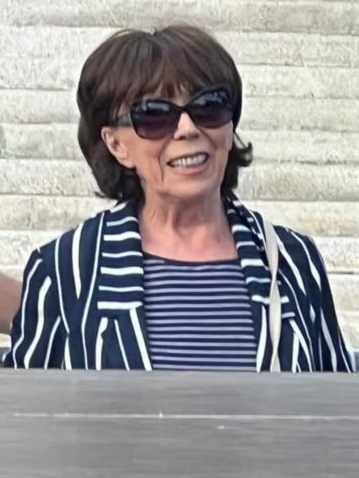
- Seka Sablić in 2023
- Born: Jelisaveta Sablić; 13 June 1942 (age 84); Belgrade, German-occupied Serbia
- Education: Faculty of Dramatic Arts
- Alma mater: University of Arts in Belgrade
- Occupation: Actress
- Children: 1
- Relatives: Ana Alexander (niece)
- Awards: Full list

Jelisaveta "Seka" Sablić (Serbian Cyrillic: Јелисавета "Сека" Саблић; born 13 June 1942) is a Serbian actress. She has performed in theatre houses in Belgrade and on TV and film. She is the winner of major theatre awards in Serbia and former Yugoslavia and Serbia and Montenegro.

== Personal life ==
She was born and grew up in Belgrade. Her father Stefan Sablić was a Croatian Serb from Mala Gradusa in Banija, Croatia-Slavonia, Austria-Hungary; her mother Ana Avramović was from Dorćol, Serbia, and was of Sephardi Jewish descent. She has one brother, Siniša Sablić. Her son Stefan Sablić is a theatre director. Her niece Ana Alexander is also an actress.

Sablić was a close friend of actors Dragan Nikolić and Milena Dravić and was also a maid of honour at their 1971 wedding.

== Filmography ==
=== Television ===
Year	Title	Role
1968	Ilustrovani život	
1968	Noćno dežurstvo sestre Grizelde	
1975	U registraturi	Justa Medonić
1987–1991	Bolji život	Seka Sekulović
1993–1996	Srećni ljudi	Marijana Kolaković
1998–1999	Porodično blago	nurse
2005–2007	Ljubav, navika, panika	Vera Milićević
2007–2009	Lud, zbunjen, normalan	Senka Vihorec
2010	Kuku Vasa	Natalija
2010	Miris kiše na Balkanu	Nona Salom
2016	Nemoj da zvocaš	Simka

=== Film ===
Year	Title	Role
1969	Vrane	Olja
1969	Silom otac	Zorica
1970	Biciklisti	
1970	Burdus	Rajka
1975	Kičma	herself
1976	Četiri dana do smrti	
1977	Leptirov oblak	
1980	Rad na neodređeno vreme	Seka
1980	The Woman from Sarajevo	
1981	Laf u srcu	Živka
1982	Moj tata na određeno vreme	Seka
1982	Maratonci trče počasni krug	Kristina
1983	How I Was Systematically Destroyed by an Idiot (Kako sam sistematski uništen od idiota)	Rita
1984	Davitelj protiv davitelja	Dobrila Skara
1985	Moljac	crazy director
2009	Technotise: Edit & I	Keva
2020	Hotel Belgrade	grandma

== Awards ==
- Montréal World Film Festival, Best Actress, 1982, for Maratonci trče počasni krug
- Pula Film Festival, Best Actress, 1982, for Maratonci trče počasni krug
- Days of Nušić Festival, Award for lifework of a Comedian, 2006
- Ljubinka Bobić Award, 2006
- Golden Turkey, Best Actress, 2006, for Svinjski otac
- Žanka Stokić Award, Best Actress, 2008
