= Nešto između =

1983 film

- Directed by: Srđan Karanović
- Written by: Srđan Karanović; Andrew Horton; Milosav Marinović
- Produced by: Milan Zmukic
- Starring: Caris Corfman; Miki Manojlović
- Cinematography: Živko Zalar
- Edited by: Branka Čeperac
- Music by: Zoran Simjanović
- Release date: 17 December 1982
- Running time: 105 minutes
- Country: Yugoslavia
- Language: English

Nešto između is a 1982 Yugoslavian drama film directed by Srdjan Karanovic. It was screened in the Un Certain Regard section at the 1983 Cannes Film Festival.

== Cast ==
- Caris Corfman - Eve (Eva)
- Miki Manojlović - Janko (as Predrag Manojlović)
- Dragan Nikolić - Marko
- Zorka Manojlović - Majka (as Zorka Doknić-Manojlović)
- Renata Ulmanski - Tetka
- Nina Kirsanova - Baba
- Petar Ilić - Sin (as Petar Ilić-Hajne)
- Gorica Popović - Dunja
- Sonja Savić - Tvigica
- Branko Cvejić - Barmen
- Zaba Madden - Konobarica
- Ljubisa Bacic - Laza
- Timothy John Byford - Peter
- Ljiljana Sljapic - Ženska
- Jelica Sretenović - Jelica
