= Rade Marković =

Serbian actor

- Раде Марковић
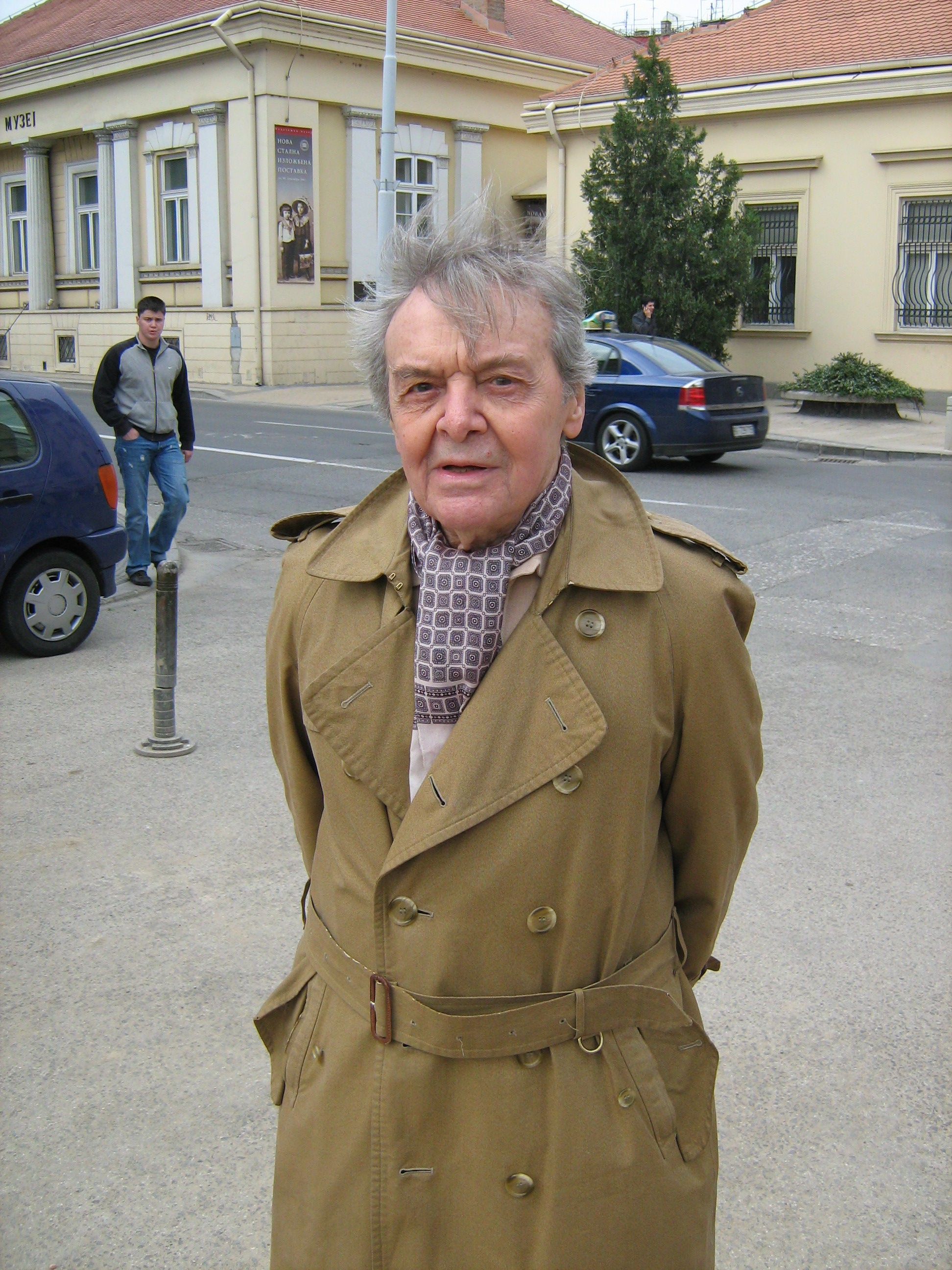
- Rade Marković in April 2009.
- Born: 14 October 1921; Belgrade, Kingdom of Serbs, Croats and Slovenes
- Died: 10 September 2010 (aged 88); Zabok, Croatia
- Occupation: Actor
- Years active: 1948–2005
- Spouse: Olivera Marković (m. 1945–1964)
- Children: 2, including a son Goran
- Awards: Dobričin prsten (1998); Statuette of Joakim Vujić (2005)

Radomir "Rade" Marković (Serbian Cyrillic: Радомир Раде Марковић; 14 October 1921 – 10 September 2010) was a Serbian actor. He performed in more than ninety films. He was married to actress Olivera Marković from 1945 until they divorced in 1964. After the divorce he had a long affair with the Bulgarian actress Nevena Kokanova, whom he met during the filming of The Peach Thief.

== Selected filmography ==
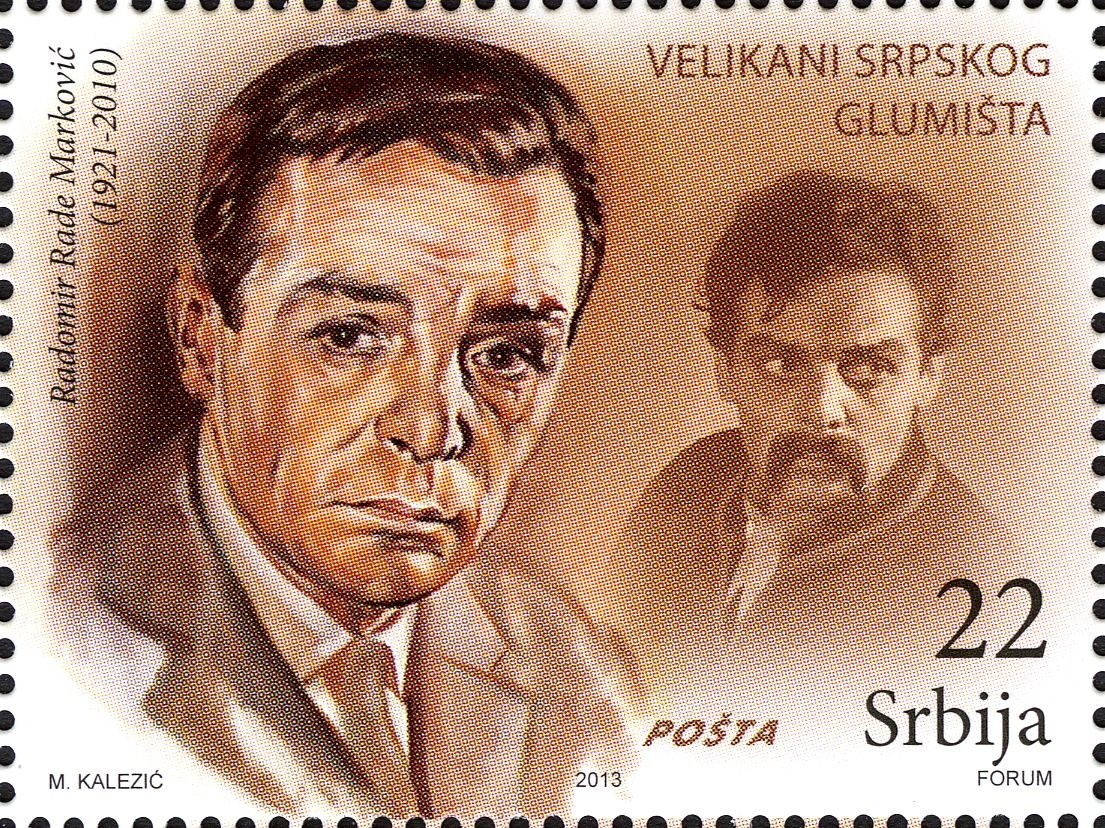
Rade Marković on a 2013 Serbian stamp

Film
Year	Title	Role	Notes
1950	The Magic Sword		
1964	The Peach Thief		
1967	Hasanaginica		
1967	The Knife	Kosta Petrov	
1968	The Demolition Squad		
1971	The Role of My Family in the Revolution	Strogi	
1972	Walter Defends Sarajevo	Sead Kapetanović	
1974	Otpisani		TV series
1975	The House		
1977	Special Education		
1979	National Class Category Up to 785 ccm		
1980	Petria's Wreath		
1981	The Promising Boy		
1982	Variola Vera		
1984	The Secret Diary of Sigmund Freud		
1988	Migrations		
1989	The Meeting Point		
1992	Tito and Me		
2003	Small World		

== Awards ==
- Dobričin prsten (1998)
- Statuette of Joakim Vujić (2005)
