= Srđan Karanović =

Serbian film director

Srdjan Karanovic
- Born: 17 November 1945 (age 80); Belgrade, Serbia, Yugoslavia
- Occupations: Film director Screenwriter
- Years active: 1968–2010

Srđan Karanović (Serbian Cyrillic: Срђан Карановић, pronounced [ˌsř̩d͜ʑan kaˈrǎːnoʋit͜ɕ], born 17 November 1945) is a Serbian film director and screenwriter. He has directed 17 films since 1968. His film Miris poljskog cveća won the FIPRESCI prize at the 1978 Cannes Film Festival, Nešto između was screened in the Un Certain Regard section at the 1983 Cannes Film Festival. A Film with No Name (Za Sada Bez Dobrog Naslova) won the Golden Tulip Award at the Istanbul International Film Festival in 1989.

His 2009 film Besa was selected as the Serbian entry for the Best Foreign Language Film at the 83rd Academy Awards, but it did not make the final shortlist. In 2017, Srđan Karanović has signed the Declaration on the Common Language of the Croats, Serbs, Bosniaks and Montenegrins.

== Selected filmography ==
Year	Film	Director	Writer	Producer	Awards / Notes
1976	Grlom u jagode	Yes	Yes	No	
1977	Miris poljskog cveća	Yes	Yes	No	Big Golden Arena for Best Film, FIPRESCI Award
1980	Petria's Wreath	Yes	Yes	No	Big Golden Arena for Best Film
1983	Nešto između	Yes	Yes	No	
1985	Jagode u Grlu	Yes	Yes	No	
1988	A Film with No Name	Yes	Yes	No	Golden Tulip at Istanbul International Film Festival
1991	Virdžina	Yes	Yes	No	Golden Palm at Valencia Festival of Mediterranean Cinema
2003	Sjaj u Očima	Yes	Yes	No	
2009	Besa	Yes	Yes	No	

== See also ==
- Praška filmska škola
