= Taiwan Canasta =

- Directed by: Goran Marković
- Starring: Boris Komnenić; Neda Arnerić
- Music by: Zoran Simjanović
- Production company: Centar Film
- Release date: 30 March 1985
- Running time: 1h 41min
- Country: Yugoslavia
- Language: Serbo-Croatian

Taiwan Canasta (Serbian: Tajvanska kanasta) is a 1985 Yugoslav comedy-drama film directed by Goran Marković.

== Cast ==
- Boris Komnenić - Sasa Belopoljanski
- Neda Arnerić - Narcisa Vidmar
- Radko Polič - Dusan Vidmar
- Gordana Gadžić - Ivanka
- Margita Stefanović - Dragana
- Miki Manojlović - Rade Seljak
- Petar Božović - Pedja
- Bora Todorović - Jogi
- Semka Sokolović-Bertok - Direktorka muzeja
- Bogdan Diklić - Drazenko

== Release and reception ==
The film was shown at the 1985 Pula Film Festival, where Gordana Gadžić received the Golden Arena for Best Supporting Actress.
