= Tihomir Stanić =

Serbian actor and politician (born 1960)

- Тихомир Станић
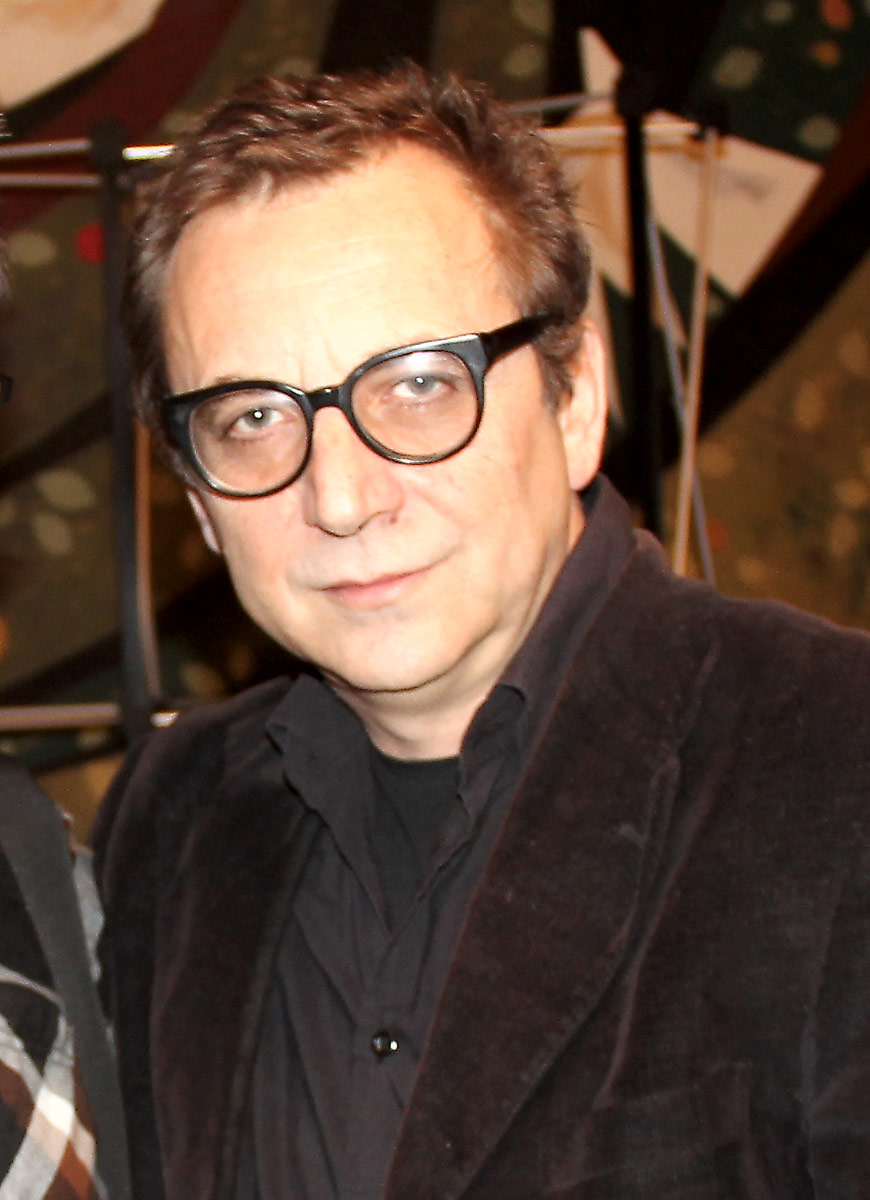

Member of the National Assembly
- Incumbent
- Assumed office 17 November 2026

Personal details
- Born: 17 November 1960 (age 66) Laktaši, PR Bosnia and Herzegovina, FPR Yugoslavia
- Party: Independent
- Other political affiliations: Student List (2026–present)
- Occupation: Actor

Tihomir Stanić (Serbian: Тихомир Станић; born 17 November 1960) is a Serbian actor and politician. Since his debut in 1981, he has appeared in more than eighty films. A supporter of the anti-corruption protests, he was elected eighth on the Student List in the 2026 Serbian parliamentary election, and has been a member of the National Assembly since 17 November 2026.

== Political career ==
Stanić supported the student-led anti-corruption protests that began in November 2024. In 2025, he said he would accept a place on the students' electoral list if asked, despite disliking politics and fearing it could harm his career, adding that "one must fight for what one believes in".

He was presented as a candidate at the Student List's opening campaign rally in Novi Sad on 10 September 2026, where he closed the event with a speech. He said he was proud to be among the 250 people chosen to represent the students, and happy to have witnessed their "mythical, magnificent struggle against evil". When the list was submitted to the Republic Electoral Commission on 14 September, he was placed eighth.

Pro-government media, including Politika and B92, criticised his candidacy, pointing to his involvement in a Democratic Party election campaign a decade earlier and questioning the list's claim to offer new faces.

The Student List won 140 of the 250 seats. Stanić entered the National Assembly when the mandates of all 250 members were confirmed at the constitutive session of the 15th convocation on 17 November 2026.

== Selected filmography ==
=== Film ===
Year	Title	Role	Notes
2008	The Tour	Stanislav	
2011	The Enemy	Daba	
2011	Zlatna levica, priča o Radivoju Koraću	Ivo Andrić	
2012	Doktor Rej i đavoli	Ivica	
2014	Little Buddho	Krsto	
2018	Neverending Past	Man at the airport	Segment "Second Story"

=== Television ===
Year	Title	Role	Notes
1987–1988	Vuk Karadžić	Jovan Sterija Popović	
1995	The End of Obrenović Dynasty	King Alexander Obrenović	
2016–2025	Ubice mog oca	Predrag Marjanović	
2021	Alexander of Yugoslavia	Mehmed Spaho	
