= Branko Cvejić =

Serbian actor (1946–2022)

- Бранко Цвејић
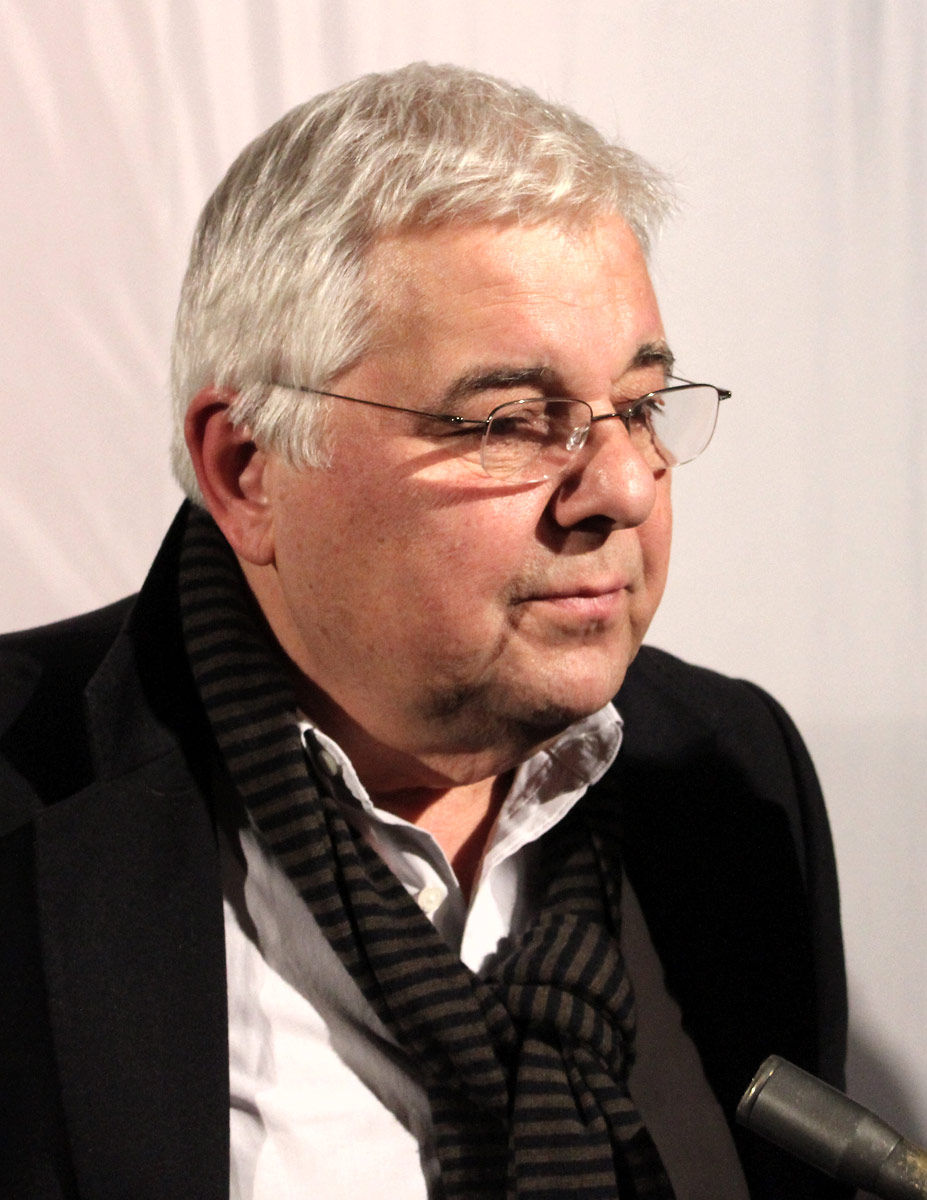
- Born: 25 August 1946; Belgrade, SR Serbia, FPR Yugoslavia
- Died: 26 July 2022 (aged 75); Belgrade, Serbia
- Other name: Bane
- Occupation: Actor
- Years active: 1962–2022

Branko Cvejić (Serbian Cyrillic: Бранко Цвејић; 25 August 1946 – 26 July 2022) was a Serbian actor. He appeared in more than one hundred films from 1962 onwards.

Cvejić was director of the Yugoslav Drama Theatre.

== Selected filmography ==
Film
Year	Title	Role	Notes
1989	Battle of Kosovo		
1987	The Harms Case		
1984	The Elusive Summer of '68	Kum Spasoje	
1983	Balkan Express		
1983	Nešto između		
1980	Petria's Wreath		
1978	Bravo maestro		

TV
Year	Title	Role	Notes
2021	Aleksandar od Jugoslavije	Vladko Maček	
2004–2006	Stižu dolari		
1975	Grlom u jagode		
