= Special Education (film) =

Специјално васпитање
- Original movie poster
- Directed by: Goran Marković
- Screenplay by: Miroslav Smić
- Starring: Bekim Fehmiu; Slavko Štimac; Ljubiša Samardžić; Branislav Lečić
- Edited by: Goran Marković
- Music by: Zoran Simjanović
- Release date: 1977
- Running time: 110 minutes
- Country: Yugoslavia
- Language: Serbo-Croatian

Special Education (Serbo-Croatian: Specijalno vaspitanje / Специјално васпитање) is a 1977 Yugoslav drama directed by Goran Marković. It was his first feature film. The screenplay was written by Marković and Miroslav Simić.

The film was finished short before 1977, but it was first screened in 1977, at the Pula Film Festival. Ljubiša Samardžić was awarded the Big Golden Arena, for his role of policeman Cane. The film received the first prize at the Mannheim Film Festival. It was a critical and commercial success.

== Cast ==
Actor	Role
Slavko Štimac	Pera Antić "Trta"
Bekim Fehmiu	Žarko Munižaba
Aleksandar Berček	Ljupče Milovanović
Ljubiša Samardžić	police officer Cane
Milivoje Tomić	Trustee Correctional Facility
Cvijeta Mesić	Psychologist Kosara
Branislav Lečić	Fikret Hadžiabdić
Ratko Tankosić	"Sarma"
Hasim Ugljanin	"Sirće"
Olivera Ježina	Mira
Rade Marković	The Judge
Jovan Janićijević Burduš	repairman Hranislav
Slobodan Aligrudić	Police commander
Radmila Savićević	neighbor
Milka Lukić	Rosa, Cane's wife
Josif Tatić	Educator Stojanović
Radmila Guteša	Social worker
Vladan Živković	Driver of cold storage
Mirjana Blašković	Pera's mom
Ljubomir Ćipranić	Ilija
Predrag Milinković	Second drunker
Petar Lupa	Third drunker
Voja Brajović	as himself
