= Aleksandar Berček =

Serbian actor

- Александар Берчек
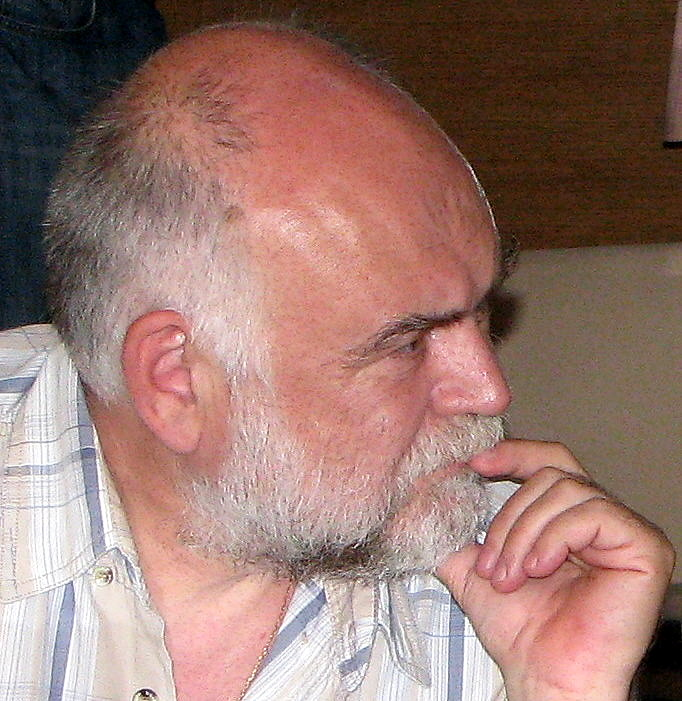
- Born: 4 September 1950 (age 75); Vrdnik, PR Serbia, FPR Yugoslavia
- Occupation: Actor
- Years active: 1971–present

Aleksandar Berček (Serbian Cyrillic: Александар Берчек; born 4 September 1950) is a Serbian actor. He performed in more than one hundred films since 1971. He graduated at the Academy for theater, film, radio and television. He was the director of the National Theatre in Belgrade from 21 January 1993 to 10 May 1997.

== Awards ==
- 1980: Golden Arena for his role in the film Ko to tamo peva (Who's Singin' Over There?)
- 2001: Pavle Vuisic Award, for Lifetime Achievement
- 2012: Golden Ring for Lifetime Achievement
- 2021: awarded the Order of Karađorđe's Star

== Selected filmography ==
Film
Year	Title	Role	Notes
2021	South Wind 2: Speed up	Crveni (The red one)	
2013	Circles		
2007	Promise Me This		
2004	Life Is a Miracle		
1999	The Dagger		
1998	Cabaret Balkan		
1998	Barking at the Stars		
1984	The End of the War		
1981	The Promising Boy		
1980	Who's Singin' Over There? (Ko to tamo peva)		
1978	Bravo maestro		
1977	Special Education		

TV
Year	Title	Role	Notes
1995	The End of Obrenović Dynasty		
1987	Vuk Karadžić		
1975	Grlom u jagode		
1974	Otpisani		
