= Goran Marković =

Serbian film director, screenwriter, writer and professor

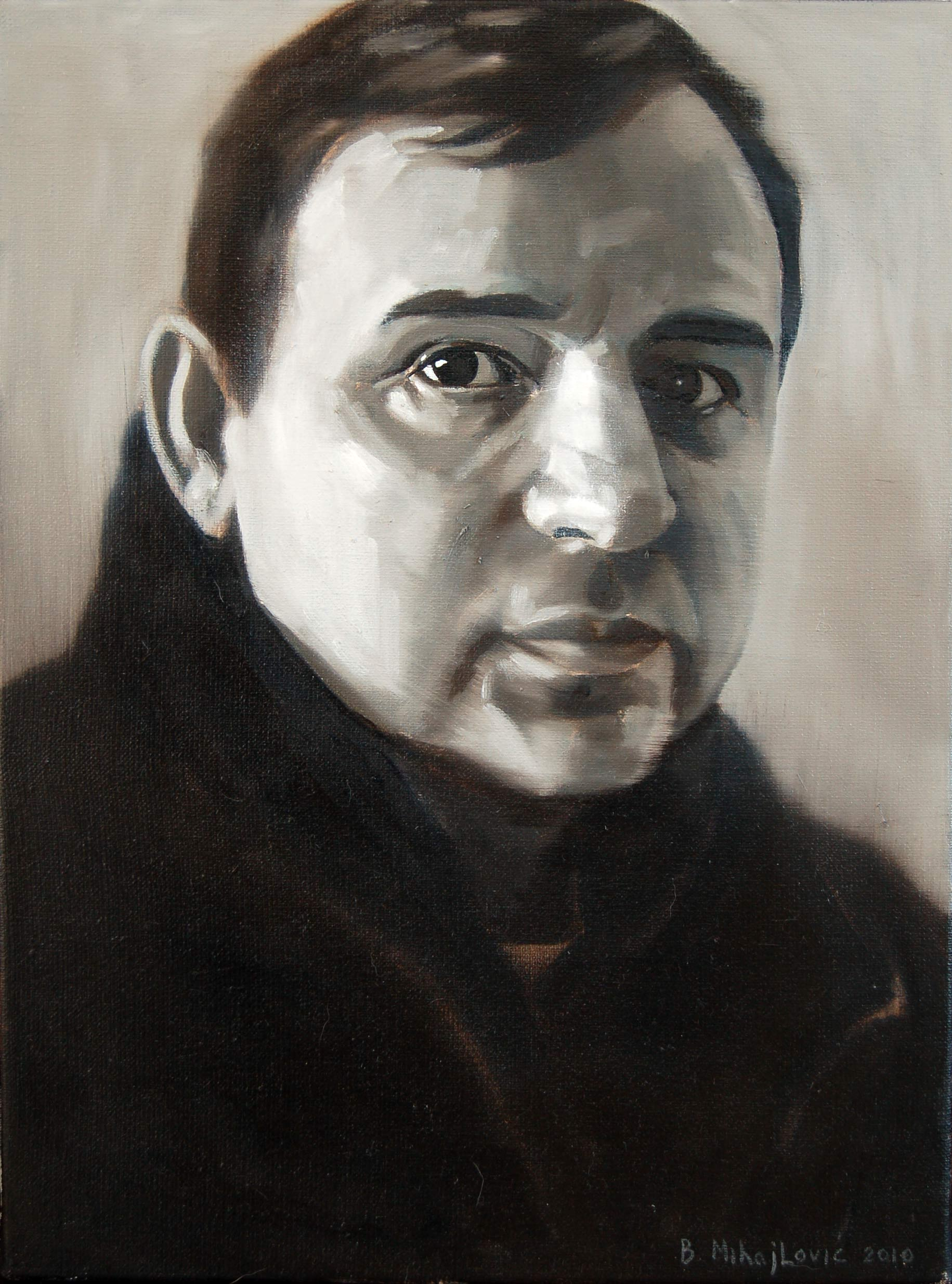
- Born: 24 August 1946 (age 79); Belgrade, PR Serbia, Yugoslavia
- Occupations: Film director Screenwriter; Film producer University professor
- Years active: 1970–current

Goran Marković (Serbian Cyrillic: Горан Марковић, pronounced [ˌɡǒran ˈmaːrkoʋit͜ɕ]) (born 24 August 1946) is a Serbian film and theatre director, screenwriter, writer, and playwright. He has directed approximately 50 documentaries, 13 feature films, and 3 theatre plays. He has also written five books.

Marković is one of the few directors from the former Yugoslavia credited with popularizing Yugoslav films, as well as achieving success domestically and internationally.

== Career ==
Marković was born in Belgrade to Rade and Olivera Marković, both established Serbian actors. He finished 5th Belgrade Gymnasium prior to attending FAMU at the Academy of Performing Arts in Prague.

Marković is the winner of more than 30 Yugoslavian, Serbian, and international film and theatre awards, the most significant of them being two Pula festival "Zlatna arena" awards, an award for the best director at the San Sebastian Film Festival for the film Tito and Me, Grand Prix of Americas at the Montreal World Film Festival for the movie Kordon and Sterija's Award for the best modern drama text for the theatre play "Turneja". The film version of Turneja won both "Best Film" and "Best Scenario" at the 2009 European Film Festival in Kyiv as well as Best Director and the Fipresci awards at the Montreal World Film Festival.

A consistent opponent of the government of Slobodan Milošević, Marković expressed his political stance in three post-1995 documentary films produced or co-produced with Radio B92: Crazy People (1997), Ordinary Heroes (2000) and Serbia, Year Zero (2001).

Marković was also a professor at Belgrade Faculty of Dramatic Arts and is a member of the European Film Academy in Brussels.

In 2017, Marković has signed the Declaration on the Common Language of the Croats, Serbs, Bosniaks and Montenegrins.

== Filmography ==
=== Feature films ===
Year	Film	Director	Writer	Producer	Awards / Notes
1977	Special Education	Yes	Yes	No	
1979	National Class Category Up to 785 ccm	Yes	Yes	No	
1980	Majstori, majstori	Yes	Yes	No	
1982	Variola Vera	Yes	Yes	No	
1985	Taiwan Canasta	Yes	Yes	No	
1987	Reflections	Yes	Yes	No	Big Golden Arena for Best Film
1989	The Meeting Point	Yes	Yes	No	Audience and critics award at Avoriaz Fantastic Film Festival, Big Golden Arena for Best Film
1992	Tito and Me	Yes	Yes	Yes	Silver Seashell award at San Sebastián International Film Festival
1995	Urnebesna tragedija	Yes	Yes	No	Best Director award at Montréal World Film Festival
2002	Kordon	Yes	Yes	No	Grand Prix des Amériques at Montréal World Film Festival
2008	The Tour	Yes	Yes	No	Audience Award at Thessaloniki Film Festival
2013	Falsifier	Yes	Yes	No	
2016	A Stowaway on the Ship of Fools	Yes	No	No	TV film in II parts and a theatre release
2019	Delirijum tremens	Yes	Yes	No	Statueta Sloboda at SOFEST

=== Documentaries ===
- Neobavezno (1970), TV series documentary in two installments
- Glumci (1973), TV series documentary in two installments
- Junaci (1976), TV series documentary in five installments
- Poludeli ljudi (1997)
- Nevažni junaci (1999)
- Serbie, année zéro (2001)
- Konstantin Koča Popović (2014)
- Mnoštvo i manjina (2017)

== See also ==
- Praška filmska škola
