= Olivera Marković =

Serbian actress

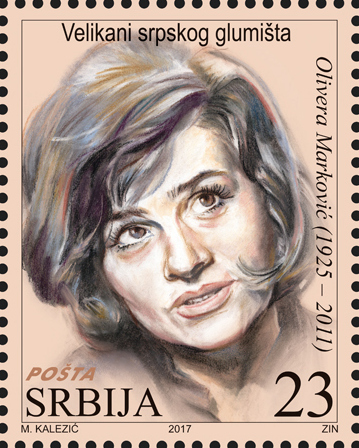
- Born: Olivera Đorđević; 3 May 1925; Belgrade, Kingdom of Serbs, Croats and Slovenes (now Serbia)
- Died: 2 July 2011 (aged 86); Belgrade, Serbia
- Occupation: Actress
- Years active: 1946–2005
- Spouse: Rade Marković (m. 1945–1964)
- Children: 2, including Goran

Olivera Marković (née Đorđević; Serbian Cyrillic: Оливера Марковић; 3 May 1925 – 2 July 2011) was a Serbian actress. She appeared in 170 films and television shows between 1946 and 2005. She won the Golden Arena for Best Actress in 1964 for her role in Službeni položaj.

== Life ==
Olivera married twice. Her first marriage was to actor Rade Marković; they divorced after nineteen years of marriage. They had one child during that marriage (a son named Goran who is an actor. Her second marriage was to Dušan Bulajić. They were married until his death at the age of 63.

She died of cancer in 2011, at the age of eighty-six.

== Selected filmography ==
=== Film ===
Year	Title	Role	Notes
1959	Train Without a Timetable	Ike	
1962	Siberian Lady Macbeth	Katerina Izmajlowa / Lady Macbeth	
1987	It Happened on This Very Day	Tetka	
1992	Tito and Me	Baka	

=== Television ===
Year	Title	Role	Notes
1973	Neven	Various roles	26 episodes
1976	Grlom u jagode	Banetova majka Olivera	10 episodes
1987-1991	Bolji život	Buba Radovic-Djordjevic	33 episodes
