= Radoslav Pavlović =

Serbian writer (born 1954)

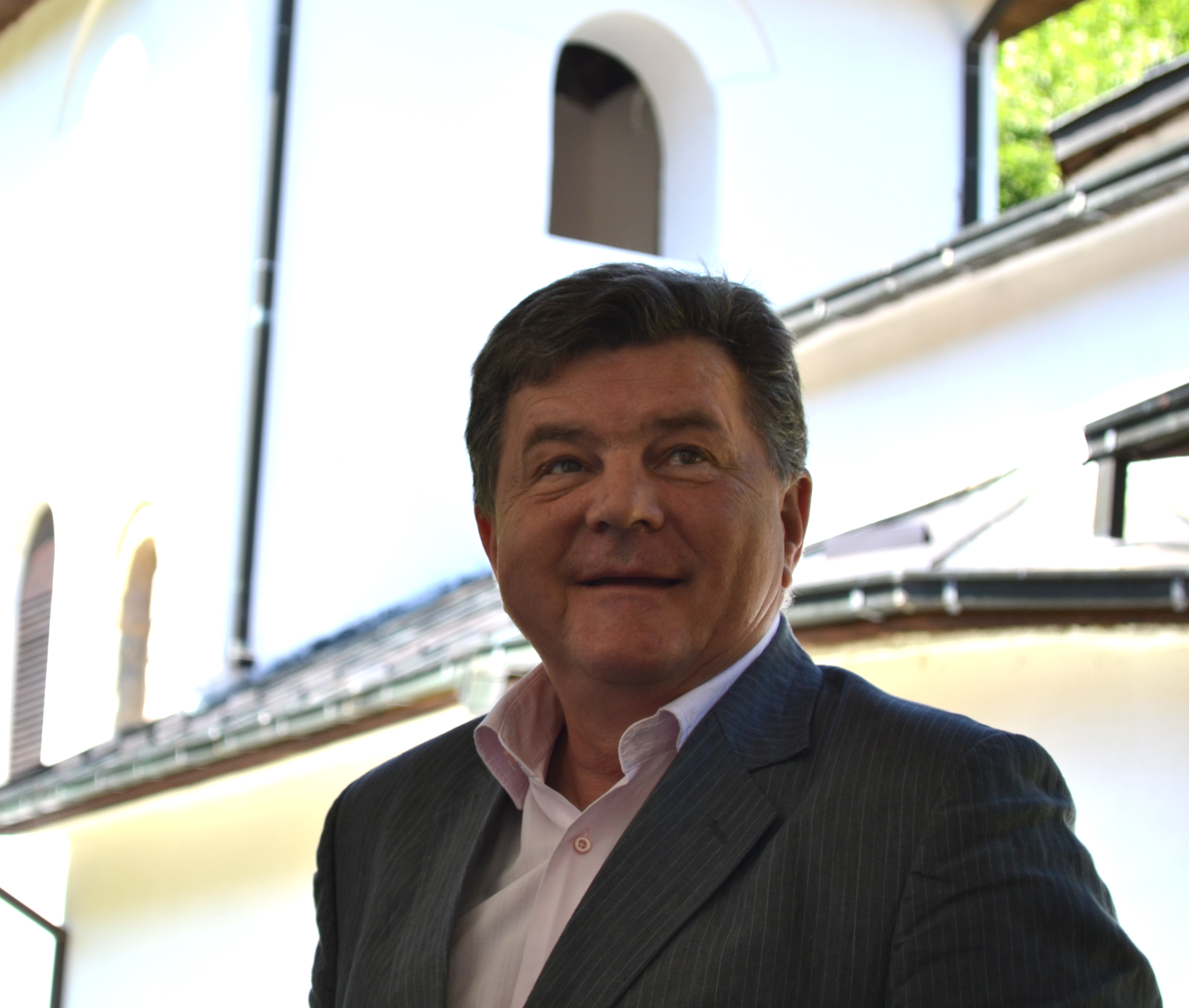
- Pavlović in Voljavča monastery, May 2013
- Born: Radoslav Pavlović; 8 September 1954 (age 72); Aleksandrovac, Serbia
- Education: University of Belgrade
- Occupation: Playwright
- Children: 2

Radoslav (Lale) Pavlović (Serbian: Радослав Павловић; born 8 September 1954, in Aleksandrovac, Serbia) is a Serbian writer. Pavlovic authored numerous theatre plays and film/TV scripts popular with the audience and acclaimed by the critics. He is best known for his theatre plays Šovinistička farsa, performed more than a thousand times across ex-Yugoslavia, Mala, and Moja Draga performed for hundreds of times in Belgrade theaters, as well as movies Balkan Rules (1997), Living like the rest of us (1983), Hajde da se volimo 3 (1990) featuring ex-Yugoslavia mega-star Lepa Brena, and TV series Moj Rodjak sa Sela (2008) scoring record viewership of over 3 million viewers per episode.

From 2012 to 2017 Pavlović served as advisor for Culture to the President of Serbia, Tomislav Nikolić. In the context of his political role, Pavlović was working on causes related to Serbia's historical heritage and raising awareness of it within public, such as the life and work of Alexander I of Yugoslavia, or the Edict of Milan issued by Constantine the Great who was born in Serbia. Prior to taking the Advisor position, Pavlović served as deputy Editor in Chief of the Cultural and Educational Programme at the National Radio Television of Serbia.

Pavlović served as Director of the Cultural Centre of Serbia in Paris from 2017 to 2019 when he retired.

== Early life ==
Pavlović was born on 9 August 1954, in Aleksandrovac to father Rajko, and mother Miroslava, both school teachers, respectively from Rogojevac and Kikojevac, typical Šumadija villages. The family moved to Belgrade where he finished elementary school, high-school and university (dramaturgy major). Autobiographical elements can often be found in his work, and references to his childhood in Šumadija are common, especially in Moj Rodjak sa Sela set in a village in Šumadija.

== Playwright career ==
Pavlović's first play, Savremenik, attracted the eye of theatre professionals in Serbia. As a result, the play was presented at the festival Sterijino pozorje 1979. and Pavlović was distinguished as the most promising young playwright. Not much later Pavlović wrote his first major theatre play Šovinistička farsa that had four sequels from 1985 to 1998 and was performed for more than 1800 times (the first sequel being performed 1200 times), with main actors Predrag Ejdus and Josif Tatić. The play received several awards, including the Best script award at 11th Satire days (Croatian: Dani satire) in Zagreb, 1986, and remains one of Pavlović's best-known theatre plays.

After Šovinistička farsa, Pavlović continued to write plays for Belgrade theatres, such as Braća po oružju, Život Jovanov or Mala (performed for 173 times, and seen by 57 376 people and later adapted to a movie The Little One).

This led to a peak of his theatre career in late '80s and early '90s when the audience could simultaneously see five of his plays in theatres at the same time (Muke po Živojinu, Šovinistička farsa, Mala, Čaruga, and U potrazi za izgubljenom srećom). Due to popular demand some plays had to be performed more than once a day (such as the play Moja Draga).

In theatre, Pavlović collaborates with many famous Serbian actors, such as Marko Nikolić (actor), Predrag Laković, Danilo Lazović, Dragan Jovanović (actor), Anica Dobra, Katarina Žutić, Lazar Ristovski, Dragan Bjelogrlić, Žarko Laušević, Nikola Kojo, Renata Ulmanski, musicians such as Osvajači and Bajaga and directors such as Darko Bajić. In later career, Pavlović wrote two sequels of the series Moj Rodjak sa Sela with motives from his home Šumadija. The series offer an alternative view to the modern Serbian village, focusing on elements that were previously less present on the TV screen, even forgotten or unknown to the modern audience in the domain of architecture, costume, narrative and historical references. The series brought together numerous famous Serbian actors such as Vojin Ćetković, Dubravka Mijatović, Nikola Kojo, Dragan Jovanović, Vera Čukić, Nebojša Glogovac, Petar Božović, Tanasije Uzunović and Opera primadonna Jadranka Jovanović. The series reached a record audience of 3 million viewers per episode, which was substantial for Serbian market composed of only 7 million people at the time.

== Career at Radio Television of Serbia ==
At the beginnings of his career, Pavlović worked as editor at the national television, Radio Television of Serbia, and gave up this job to focus on his writing career that took off with popularity of his work with the audience. He went back to Radio Television of Serbia as deputy Editor in Chief of the Cultural and Educational Programme in 2009.

I accepted the position of deputy chief editor of cultural and educational programs ... Since I went bankrupt due to the series, which was written three and a half years, and to ensure its filming I had to do a great deal of lobbying, hence I almost lived at the RTS at the time trying to connect people ... When I complained to the Director-general himself that as a freelance artist for 20 years I managed to go bankrupt, he said: "Do you want a job?" I thought about it and said, "Yes, thank you." Otherwise, as a young writer in the 80s I was hired by RTS and was there for nine years. The last thing I did was to sign the filming of a series of Balkan Express by Gordan Mihić, directed by Gaga Antonijević. Then, from the need to have all the time in the world for yourself and writing, I terminated my employment and became a free artist. Twenty years later, I returned to my home.

— Radoslav Pavlović, Glas javnosti 26 April 2009.

== Political Career and Views ==
Since March 2008, Pavlović is a member of Serbian Progressive Party, and the president of the Party's Culture Council. About his reasons for starting a political career Pavlović said for Glas javnosti:

The entry into politics was a classic gesture of self-defense. Since I wrote about things as I see them and had some success, colleagues are eager to retire me. One of my plays was released in 1995, was called "Comedy Beograd", and provoked the general anger of the whole town and all political parties, from SPO to SPS. Since then I have watched my disciplined colleagues become theatre managers and directors of different things, ministers ... From March last year, when at the age of 54 I joined the Serbian Radical Party, many journalists have asked me why. But no one asked why I was the last one to join any party. So, because we have become a party state, and being from Šumadija I could only choose national party. When it came to splitting the party, I was terribly happy, because I'm in the party that fits me and where I have someone to talk to, and where there is someone to hear me. Our goal is to create an environment in which culture will speak critically of all phenomena, and in which decision about plays that get to be performed are not made based on one's the membership in the party ... install the ambiance of the right to be different.

— Radoslav Pavlović, Glas javnosti 26th of April 2009.

From 2017 he serves as Director of the Cultural Centre of Serbia in Paris. From 2012 to 2017, he served as advisor to the Serbian President Tomislav Nikolić. He briefly served as President of the board of the National Theatre in Belgrade but resigned in 2013.

== Notable works ==
=== Films ===
Pavlović wrote scripts for many popular movies of Serbian and ex-Yugoslavian culture.

Year	Film	Director	Notes
1980	Piknik u Topoli	Zoran Amar	
1982	Stepenice za nebo	Miroslav Lekić	
1983	Živeti kao sav normalan svet	Miloš Radivojević	Miloš Radivojević awarded as Best Director at the 29th Pula Film Festival 1982, and Sonja Savić awarded as Best Actress at the 17th Film Festival in Niš 1982
1987	Prljavi film	Dušan Sabo	
1990	Hajde da se volimo 3	Stanko Crnobrnja	Due to its cult status and reception with the audience, this move is (even 25 after its first airing), still systematically replayed on TV especially around New Year.
1990	Mala (translated as The Little One)	Predrag Antonijević	Roles: Mirjana Joković, Mirjana Karanović, Danilo Lazović, Srđan Todorović, Ljubiša Samardžić, and many others.
1996	Balkanska pravila	Darko Bajić	
2003	Volim te najviše na svetu	Predrag Velinović	

=== TV ===
First Episode Date	Series Title	Seasons	Total episodes	Notes
26 October 2008	Moj Rodjak sa Sela	2	28	up to 3 million people watched one episode of the series

=== Theatre Plays ===
First Performance Year	Play Title	Theater	Notes
1978	Savremenik	Studentski kulturni centar (Belgrade)	Roles: Dara Džokić, Vladimir Jevtović, Miki Manojlović, Lazar Ristovski, Predrag Ejdus. Performed at Sterijino pozorje on the 16 April. 1979.
1985	Šovinistička farsa	Studentski kulturni centar (Belgrade)	The play was performed more than 1800 times across the country (then Yugoslavia) Radoslav Pavlović received an award for Best script at 11th Satire days (Croatian: Dani satire) in Zagreb, 1986.
1986	Muke po Živojinu	Yugoslav Drama Theatre	Roles: Žarko Laušević, Olga Odanović, Marko Baćović, Dragan Jovanović, Josif Tatić
1987	Braća po oružju	Malo pozorište "Duško Radović"	Olivera Marković, Predrag Ejdus, Branko Cvejić, Nenad Nenadović, Branka Pujić
1989	U potrazi za izgubljenom srećom	Malo pozorište "Duško Radović"	Mihailo Janketić, Boban Petrović, Janoś Tot
1990	Mala	Zvezdara teatar	Roles: Anica Dobra, Katarina Žutić, Lazar Ristovski, Dragan Bjelogrlić, Žarko Laušević, Nikola Kojo, Renata Ulmanski, Danilo Lazović, Predrag Laković Opening : March the 7th 1990, Performed 173 times, and seen by 57 376 people
1991	Šovinistička farsa 2	Malo pozorište "Duško Radović"	
1992	Život Jovanov	Zvezdara teatar	Roles: Predrag Laković, Dragan Bjelogrlić, Danilo Lazović, Dragan Jovanović (actor) Music: Bajaga Opening : April the 7th 1992
1993	Čaruga	Zvezdara teatar	Roles: Žarko Laušević (main role), Dragan Jovanović, Danilo Lazović, Anica Dobra, Zoran Cvijanović, Radmila Živković. After Žarko Laušević was arrested for murder in July 1993, the other actors decided not to replace him, but rather stop performing the play.
1994	Moja draga	Belgrade Drama Theatre	The play was a great commercial success, and has been performed for more than 300 times in a timespan of 100 days. The management of the theatre then removed the play from the programme due to overwhelming popularity. The crew composed of actors such as Dragan Bjelogrlić, Nikola Kojo, Dubravka Mijatović and Branka Katić performed the play for free, on the square in front of the theatre, and the play then moved to another theatre Zvezdara Teatar.
1995	Šovinistička farsa 3	Produkcija ZAM	
1995	Beograd	Malo pozorište "Duško Radović"	Roles: Boris Komnenić, Nela Mihailović, Nataša Ninković, Tihomir Arsić, Lidija Pletl, Predrag Laković
1998	Moja mama	Kult Teatar	Roles: Ružica Sokić, Dragan Petrović Pele, Danijela Kuzmanović, Ivan Tomić
1998	Vidimo se u Den Hagu (Šovinistička farsa 4)	Kult Teatar	
2000	Tri boje duge	Slavija Teatar	Main roles performed by Mirjana Karanović and Marko Nikolić (actor). Music by Osvajači
2000	Jedanaest nedelja	Yugoslav Drama Theatre	
2001	Program Uzivo	Kult Teatar	Roles: Marko Nikolić, Milorad Mandić, Anastasija Mandić, Jovana Petronijević
2003	Slatke usne mladosti	Kult Teatar	Roles: Branka Pujić, Katarina Radivojević
2007	Pastorala	Kult Teatar	Roles: Miroljub Turajlija, Danijela Štajnfeld, Marijana Mićić

== Literature ==
- Moj rodjak sa sela, Radoslav Pavlović, Beogradska knjiga (2010), ISBN 978-8675902478
- Moj rodjak sa sela 2, Radoslav Pavlović, Beogradska knjiga (2011), ISBN 978-8675902690
- Kraljica zanrova, Radoslav Pavlović, Beogradska knjiga (2010), ISBN 978-8675902577
- Politicko pozoriste, Radoslav Pavlović, Beogradska knjiga (2010), ISBN 978-8675902591
- Beogradski komadi, Radoslav Pavlović, Beogradska knjiga (2010), ISBN 978-8675902614
- 'Aleksandar Prvi Karadjordjević', Radoslav Pavlović, Zavod za udžbenike (2015), ISBN 978-8617191939

Government offices
Preceded by Bratislav Petković	Advisor to the President of Serbia - Culture; 1 August 2012 – 2017	Succeeded by to be disclosed
Preceded by Vuk Veličković	Director of Cultural Centre of Serbia in Paris; 2017 – present	Succeeded by Incumbent
