= Vuk Karadžić (TV series) =

Yugoslavian TV series (2017–18)

- Created by: Milovan Vitezović
- Starring: Miki Manojlović; Aleksandar Berček; Branimir Brstina; Dragana Varagić; Marko Nikolić; Petar Kralj
- Country of origin: Yugoslavia
- Original languages: Serbo-Croatian; Slavonic-Serbian; German; Russian
- No. of episodes: 16

Production
- Running time: approx. 82 minutes

Original release
- Network: TV Belgrade
- Release: 8 November 1987 – 21 February 1988

Vuk Karadžić (Serbian Cyrillic: Вук Караџић) is а Yugoslav historical drama television series which depicts the life and work of Vuk Stefanović Karadžić (7 November 1787 – 7 February 1864), a Serbian linguist and reformer of the Serbian language.

== Cast ==
- Miki Manojlović as Vuk Karadžić
- Aleksandar Berček as Miloš Obrenović
- Branimir Brstina as Mateja Nenadović
- Dragana Varagić as Ana Karadžić
- Marko Nikolić as Karađorđe Petrović
- Petar Kralj as Jernej Kopitar
- Bata Živojinović as Jakov Nenadović
- Svetozar Cvetković as Petar Nikolajević Moler
- Milan Štrljić as Dimitrije Davidović
- Dragan Zarić as Jevrem Obrenović
- Vladan Živković as Sima Milosavljević-Paštramac
- Ljuba Tadić as Bishop Stefan Stratimirović
- Danilo Lazović as Stefan Karadžić
- Adem Cejvan as Mladen Milovanović
- Dušan Janićijević as Jevta Savić Čotrić
- Gala Videnović as Ruža Todorova
- Aljoša Vučković as Toma Vučić Perišić
- Milorad Mandić as Igrić
- Tihomir Stanić as Jovan Sterija Popović
- Ivan Jagodić as Stevan Radičević
- Irfan Mensur as Lukijan Mušicki
- Snežana Savić as Vuk's mother
- Demeter Bitenc as Seledicki
- Ivan Klemenc as Filip Višnjić
- Rastislav Jović as Stojan Simić
- Predrag Miletić as Miloš Pocerac
- Jovan Nikčević as Sima Marković
- Miloš Žutić as Jovan Hadžić
- Gorica Popović as Ljubica Obrenović
- Radoš Bajić as Sima Milutinović Sarajlija
- Branislav Lečić as Hajduk Veljko Petrović
- Žarko Radić as Antonije Bogićević
- Eva Ras as Mrs Kraus
- Minja Vojvodić as Stanoje Glavaš
- Dušan Jakšić as Melentije Pavlović
- Dragomir Čumić as Avram Petronijević
- Žarko Laušević as Mihailo Obrenović
- Borivoje Kandić as young Vuk Karadžić
- Petar Božović as Đorđe Ćurčija
- Jovan-Burduš Janjićijević as Monk Isaija
- Lazar Ristovski as Pavle Cukić
- Branislav Jerinić as Marathli Ali Paşa
- Milan Mihailović as Gavrilo Hranislav
- Milutin Butković as Bishop Leontije
- Josif Tatić as Mihailo Filipović
- Goran Sultanović as Mileta Radojković
- Milo Miranović as Milovan Vidaković
- Miloš Kandić as Vujica Vulićević
- Tihomir Arsić as Branko Radićević
- Maja Sabljić as Mina Karadžić
- Zoran Cvijanović as Alexander Karađorđević
- Dragan M. Nikolić as Đura Daničić
- Savo Radović as Blažo
- Aleš Valič as Franz Miklosich
- Milenko Zablaćanski as Lazar Arsenijević
- Stevo Žigon as Prince Klemens Wenzel von Metternich
- Miodrag Radovanović as Dositej Obradović
- Miša Janketić as Melentije Nikšić
- Vesna Malohodžić as Princess Sara Karapandžić
- Vasja Stanković as Zvornik aga
- Nenad Nenadović as young Dimitrije Davidović
- Mira Furlan as Petrija
- Andrija Maričić as young Sima Milutinović Sarajlija
- Faruk Begoli as Sereč aga
- Predrag Bjelac as Georgije Magarešević
- Lepomir Ivković as Tešan Podrugović
- Miodrag Radovanović as General Zenaji
- Ljubomir Čipranić as Petar Jokić
- Stojan Dečermić as Ioannis Kapodistrias
- Marinko Šebez as Pavle Ivelić
- Toma Jovanović as Hegumen Kreštić
- Ljubo Škiljević as Nikola Novaković
- Damir Šaban as Jacob Grimm
- Nebojša Bakočević as Jovan Subotić
- Mihajlo Viktorovć as Joakim Vujić
- Zoran Stoiljković as Mus-Aga
- Mirjana Nikolić as Princess Julija
- Bogdan Mihailović as Peasant
- Vojislav Brajović as Leopold von Ranke
- Gordana Gadžić as Milica Stojadinović Srpkinja
- Erol Kadić as Dimitrije Demetar
- Dragan Laković as Rajović
- Mladen Nelević as Petar II Petrović-Njegoš
- Milan Gutović as Stevan Perkov Vukotić
- Darko Tomović as Nikola I Petrović-Njegoš
- Nikola Simić as Doctor Joseph Schcoda
- Miljenko Belečić as Ivan Mažuranić
- Đorđe David as Laza
- Olivera Ježina as Čučuk Stana
- Dušan Tadić as Radulović, the merchant
- Ljupko Todorovski as Mehmed Aga
- Milan Srdoč as Radič Petrović
