= Šovinistička farsa =

- Original language: Serbian language
- Written by: Radoslav Pavlović
- Characters: Slobodan Mihajlović (Josif Tatić), Bernard Drah (Predrag Ejdus),
- Genre: Comedy, Satire

Premiere
- Date: 1985
- Place: Studentski kulturni centar (Belgrade)

Šovinistička farsa (Serbian: Шовинистичка фарса), Chauvinistic Farce in English is a theatre play, written by Radoslav Pavlović that performed across former Yugoslavia prior to and during its dissolution. A total of 4 sequels of the play were produced from 1985 to 1998, and according to one of the main actors, Predrag Ejdus, the play was performed more than 1800 times, and was performed in almost every city in former Yugoslavia that had a decent theatre. Thanks to its great popularity with the audience, the play launched the carriers of then young and later famous, main actors Josif Tatić and Predrag Ejdus.

The play is mostly set as a dialog between a stereotypical Serb, Slobodan Mihajlovic (played by Tatić) and a stereotypical Croat, Bernard Drah (played by Ejdus), both of whom drink heavily. The script derives its capacity to make the audience laugh from the everlasting differences between Serbs and Croats, and the destiny of two people historically, culturally and geographically bound to one another. At first the play may have been seen as controversial due to its departure from then omnipresent dogma of Brotherhood and unity of the two people. The later events of dissolution of Yugoslavia have shown the script to be the predictor of an inevitable divorce.

Radoslav Pavlović received an award for Best script at 11th Satire days (Croatian: Dani satire) in Zagreb, 1986.

== Trivia ==
Petar Božović and Lazar Ristovski were initially cast to play the main roles but abandoned the project during rehearsals. The director then replaced them by Tatić and Ejdus. In addition to the main production of the play that toured across the country, independent plays based on the script of Šovinistička farsa were also produced in Zagreb, (with Željko Vukmirica and Mladen Crnobrnja playing the main two roles), Kruševac, Sombor, Banja Luka, Rijeka and Varaždin. The version of the play produced in Zagreb was performed for more than 300 times.
