= Eva Ras =

Serbian Jewish actress and writer

- Ева Рас
- Born: Eva Marija Balaš Vagner; 1 January 1941 (age 85); Subotica, Kingdom of Yugoslavia
- Education: Faculty of Dramatic Arts
- Alma mater: University of Arts in Belgrade
- Occupations: Actress, writer and painter
- Years active: 1963–present

Eva Marija Ras (née Balaš Vagner, Serbian Cyrillic: Балаш Вагнер; Serbian Cyrillic: Ева Рас; born 1 January 1941) is a Serbian actress, writer and painter.

== Biography ==
Ras was born on 1 January 1941 in Subotica, where she lived and went to school until she was 18, when she started to study acting and dramaturgy in Belgrade where she now lives. She performed in theatres throughout the former Yugoslavia and Serbia, on television in series written by Siniša Pavić and Dragoslav Lazić, and in films directed by Dušan Makavejev, Aleksandar Petrović, Živko Nikolić, Emir Kusturica, and Ferenc Kardos among others.

She has published collections of poems: In the Good Old Days, When Mummy Buys Me Some Money and Bed of Silver, with which she took part in the Struga Poetry Evenings in 2004; a collection of short stories: From the top of the Moon’s mountain I looked down on my round grave, the novels: Don’t crow after me on the stairs that I’m the most beautiful of all, The Grey Woman, ...Cock on the Block..., House for Sale and With Eve to Paradise, which is about how no nation should be reproached for bad rulers who are always prepared to sacrifice their people, and which appeared in Narodna knjiga bookshops towards the end of December 2004 and was sold out in a matter of days.

Altogether Eva Ras has published 13 literary works, with “House on Sale”, “With Eve to Paradise”, “Silver Bed”, and “Born Dead” being best known. Her plot is characteristically on the verge of imagined and real.

She is the widow of Radomir Stević Ras, painter as well as founder and owner of a private theatre during the period of the Communist regime. Their daughter was Kruna Ras, a Serbian writer, who died in 1993 in Paris at age 24.

== Awards ==
She was hailed by the critics as actress of the year and in Hungary was awarded the Golden Butterfly on the occasion of the Celebration of 100 Years of Film, as well as the award for life’s work Aleksandar Lifka 2005. The Yugoslav National Film Theatre awarded her their Great Seal.

Eva Ras is the winner of Golden Ring 2007 for her creative opus, an award conferred by Feniks Publisher and Makedonija Prezent Foundation for Cultural and Scientific Affirmation. Eva Ras is an academic at Mediterranean Academy 'Brothers Miladinovci'

Ras has been awarded several important domestic literary awards: Woman’s Pen (for ...Cock on the Block..., 2001); The Kočić Book (for House for Sale, 2003), Ascendancy of year (for Bed of silver, 2006) as well as The International Man Booker Peoples' Prize in 2005 for her book Born Dead, in Timothy Byford’s translation.

== Filmography ==
=== Films ===
- Zemljaci (1963)
- The Shoot (1964)
- Čovek nije tica (1965)
- The Treasure of the Aztecs (1965)
- Adam i Eva 66 (1966)
- Love Affair, or the Case of the Missing Switchboard Operator (1967)
- Ima ljubavi, nema ljubavi (1968)
- Biće skoro propast sveta (1968)
- Žarki (1970)
- In Love, Every Pleasure Has Its Pain (1971)
- Majstor i Margarita (1972)
- Kužiš stari moj (1973)
- Álljon meg a menet! (1973)
- Autó (1974)
- Álmodó ifjúság (1974)
- Ékezet (1977)
- Beštije (1977)
- Group Portrait with a Lady (1977)
- Trofej (1979)
- Minden szerdán (1979)
- Kružna putovanja (1980)
- Zalazak sunca (1982)
- Mennyei seregek (1983)
- Otac na službenom putu (1985)
- Lepota poroka (1986)
- Za sada bez dobrog naslova (1988)
- Špijun na štiklama (1988)
- El Camino del sur (1988)
- Iskušavanje đavola (1989)
- Granica (1990)
- Čudna noć (1990)
- Velika frka (1992)
- Mi nismo anđeli (1992)
- Gorilla bathes at noon (1993)
- Dnevnik uvreda 1993. (1994)
- Senka uspomena (2000)
- Država mrtvih (2002)
- Bolygótüz (2003)
- Goose Feather (2004)
- Šejtanov ratnik (2005)
- Dosije pacov (2005)
- Hitna pomoć (2007)
- Oteta deca, Massimo Spano Italija (2006)
- Komesar N..., Fabricio Kosta Italija (2010)
- Moja zemlja najlepša na svetu Mihaela Kezele, Nemačka 2011
- Parada, Srdjan Dragojević (2011)
- General M, Bakur Bakuradze (2014)
- 9 dana, Strahinja Savic (2015)
- Koža nam postaje siva, Ivan Bakrač (2015)
- Odvajanje, Boris Hadzija (2015)
- Petak 13. (2018)

=== TV ===
- Ljubav na seoski način (1970)
- Babino unuče (1976)
- Otac ili samoća (1978)
- Stan (1980)
- Naše priče (1980)
- Sivi dom (1984)
- Vuk Karadžić (1987)
- Bolji život (1987)
- Drugarica ministarka (1988)
- Holivud ili propast (1991)
- Srećni ljudi (1993)
- Policajac sa Petlovog brda (1994)
- Najviše na svetu celom (1994)
- Oriđinali (1995)
- Nasleđe (1995)
- Urgentni Centar (2014)
- Gore-dole (1996)
- Porodično blago (1998)
- A sad adio (2000)
- Stižu dolari (2004)
- Seljaci, Dragoslav Lazic 2008
- Bela ladja, Sinisa Pavic 2010
- Zvezdara, Dragoslav Lazić 2013
- Zvezdara, Dragoslav Lazić 2014
- Urgentni centar Dejan Zecevic 2015

== Books ==
- "Nemoj da grakćeš za mnom na stepeništu da sam najlepši" (Don’t Crow After Me on the Stairs that I’m the Most Beautiful (masculine form) of All)
- "Siva žena" (The Grey Woman)
- "U divna davna vremena" (In the Good Old Days)
- "Kad mi mama kupi pare" (When Mummy Buys Me Some Money)
- "Pričajte nam o Malarmeu"
- "Kuća na prodaju" (House on Sale)
- "Rođeni mrtvi" (Born Dead)
- "Sa vrha mesečeve planine gledala sam svoj okrugli grob" (From the top of the Moon’s mountain I Looked Down on My Round Grave)
- "Sa Evom u raj" (With Eva to Paradise)
- "Srebrna postelja" (Bed of Silver)
- "U areni"
- "...Petla na panj..." (...Cock on the Block...)
- "Divlji jaganjci" 2007
- "Devojka koju nisu naučili da kaže ne" ( Zadužbina Petar Kočić, Zograf) -2009
- "Tito bez holivudizovanja" (ZOGRAF) 2010
- " Vad bárányok" (timpkiado.hu)2011
- "Baderisani, Ekrem i Eva" (EVRO-GIUNTI)2011
- "Srbijo, ljubavi moja*"
- "Temura*" 2018

== Literary awards ==
- „Žensko pero“ (2001)
- „Kočićeva knjiga“ (2003)
- „Zlatni hit liber“ (2003)
- „Samsungova nagrada“ (2003)
- „The Man Booker International People's Prize“ (2005)
- Uspon godine (Novi Sad 2005)
- „Zlatan prsten„ 2007 Skoplje
- „Nagrada Bejahada “Simha Kabiljo“ 2007„ Opatija
- Melniške nights award, Bulgaria, 2012
- Danilo Kiš award
