= Nevenka Urbanova =

Serbian actress

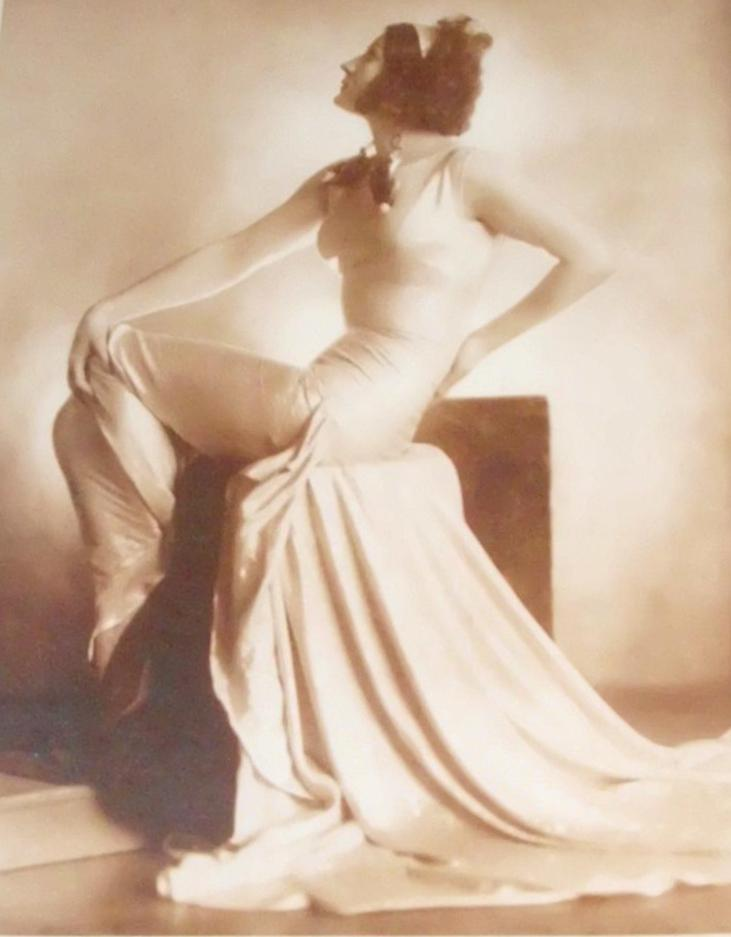
- Nevenka Urbanova as Ms. Alvarez in "This Thing Called Love" by Edwin J. Burke, National Theatre (1928)
- Born: 28 March 1909; Stari Bečej, Austro-Hungarian Monarchy
- Died: 7 January 2007 (aged 97); Belgrade, Serbia
- Occupation: Actress
- Years active: 1925–1965
- Spouse: Dušan Jovanović Đukin
- Website: https://www.imdb.com/name/nm0881640/

Nevenka Urbanova (Serbian Cyrillic: Невенка Урбанова, Stari Bečej, 28 March 1909 – Belgrade, 7 January 2007) was one of the most famous Serbian actresses.

== Theatre ==
She passed the audition in 1925, in front of Milan Grol and Milan Kašanin and was admitted as a member of drama in the National Theatre in Belgrade. Made more than 150 roles, and in 1936 became a First Class Actor of the National Theatre. She worked at the National Theatre until retirement in 1959. She last appeared on stage on 21 April 1965, as a guest of the Yugoslav Drama Theatre, in the world premiere of Sławomir Mrożek's Tango. That day, on the scene of JDP, the ensemble cast consisted of: Ljubiša Jovanović, Blaženka Katalinić, Nevenka Urbanova, Snežana Nikšić, Slavko Simić and Nikola Simić and Marko Todorović.

Some of the major roles that she played are:

- Lola Montez (Enchanted King, by Todor Manojlović)
- Baroness Kasteli – Glembaj (The Glembays, by Miroslav Krleža)
- Rina (Pokojnik, by Branislav Nušić)
- Mrs Erlynne (Lady Windermere's Fan, by Oscar Wilde)
- Hester Collyer (The Deep Blue Sea, by Terence Rattigan)
- Vaska (Koštana, by Bora Stanković)
- Julia Lambert (Adorable Julia, by Alfred Weidenmann)
- Claudine (George Dandin ou le Mari confondu, by Molière)
- Serafina Delle Rose (The Rose Tattoo, by Tennessee Williams). and many more.

She was considered to be one of the most desirable and gorgeous Serbian actresses, before and after the Second World War. Among theatrologists and colleges, like her friend and BITEF selector, Jovan Ćirilov, she was much praised:

"For the pre-war generation of viewers she's a woman of "erotic intelligence" – (femme fatale) of hers time, that Ms. Alvarez, Jarmila Janska, Jill, Zanini, Lucia Silva, Melissa, and our post-war generation Nušić's Rina, Krleža's Baroness Kasteli, Wilde's Lady Windermere, Ratigan's Hester Collyer, Sovažonova's Adorable Julia, and Serafina by Tennessee Williams. "
(Jovan Ćirilov)

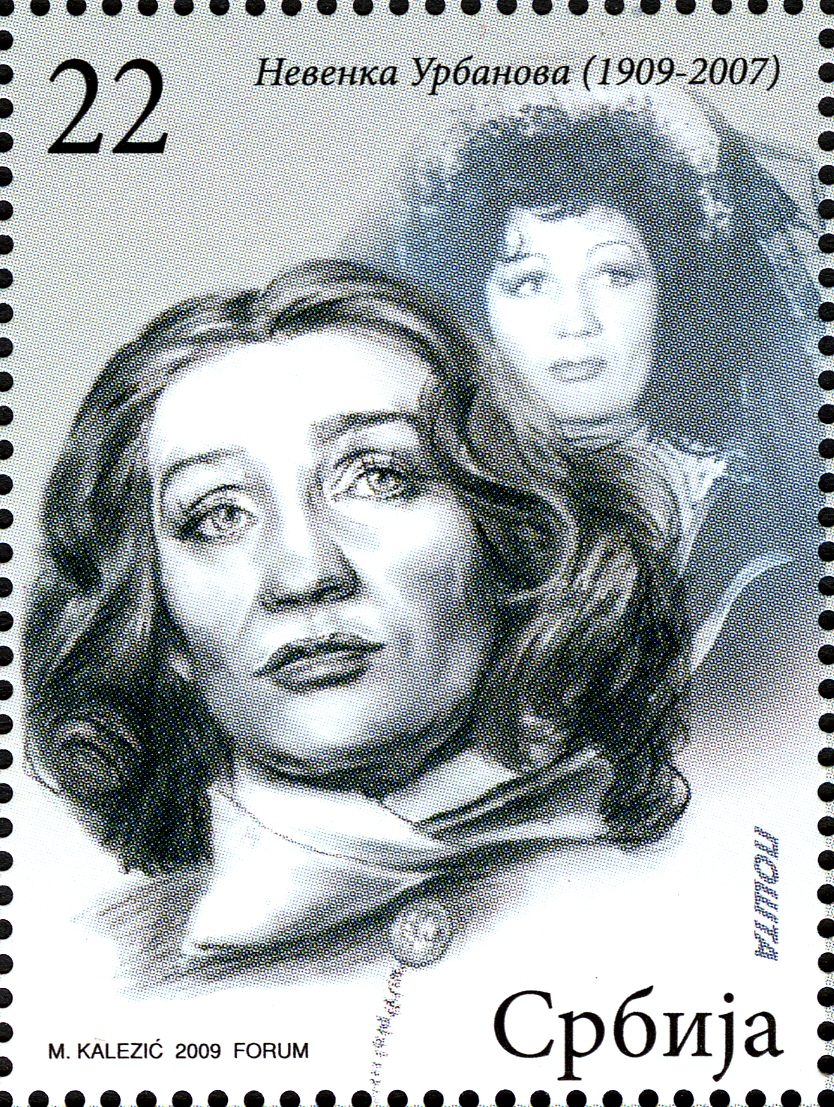
Nevenka Urbanova on a 2009 Serbian stamp

She was married to sculptor Dušan Jovanović († 1945), son of the Serbian royal photographer Milan Jovanović and the nephew of the painter Paja Jovanović. In 2002, Nevenka Urbanova donated two of her father's statues of King Petar I Karađorđević made by her husband to Prince Aleksandar of Serbia. That occasion was her last appearance in public.

== Movies ==
- Sve radi osmaha (1926),
- Da sam ranije znala (1928),
- Sofka (1948),
- Sreća u torbi (1961),
- Medallion with three heart (1962).

== Book ==
In the last decades of her life, she wrote memoirs. In 2000 she published the book Fireflies that shine with letters (Serbian: Svici koji slovima svetle), in her own edition (with the introductions of academics Dejan Medaković and director Miroslav Belović), and in 2006, the second edition (published by the National Theatre in Belgrade). During April and May 2006, in Belgrade University Library was the exhibition devoted to Hugo Klain, and during the lecture "Actors about director Hugo Klajn" on 4 May 2006, she participated in a written statement that was read by Predrag Ejdus.

== Awards ==
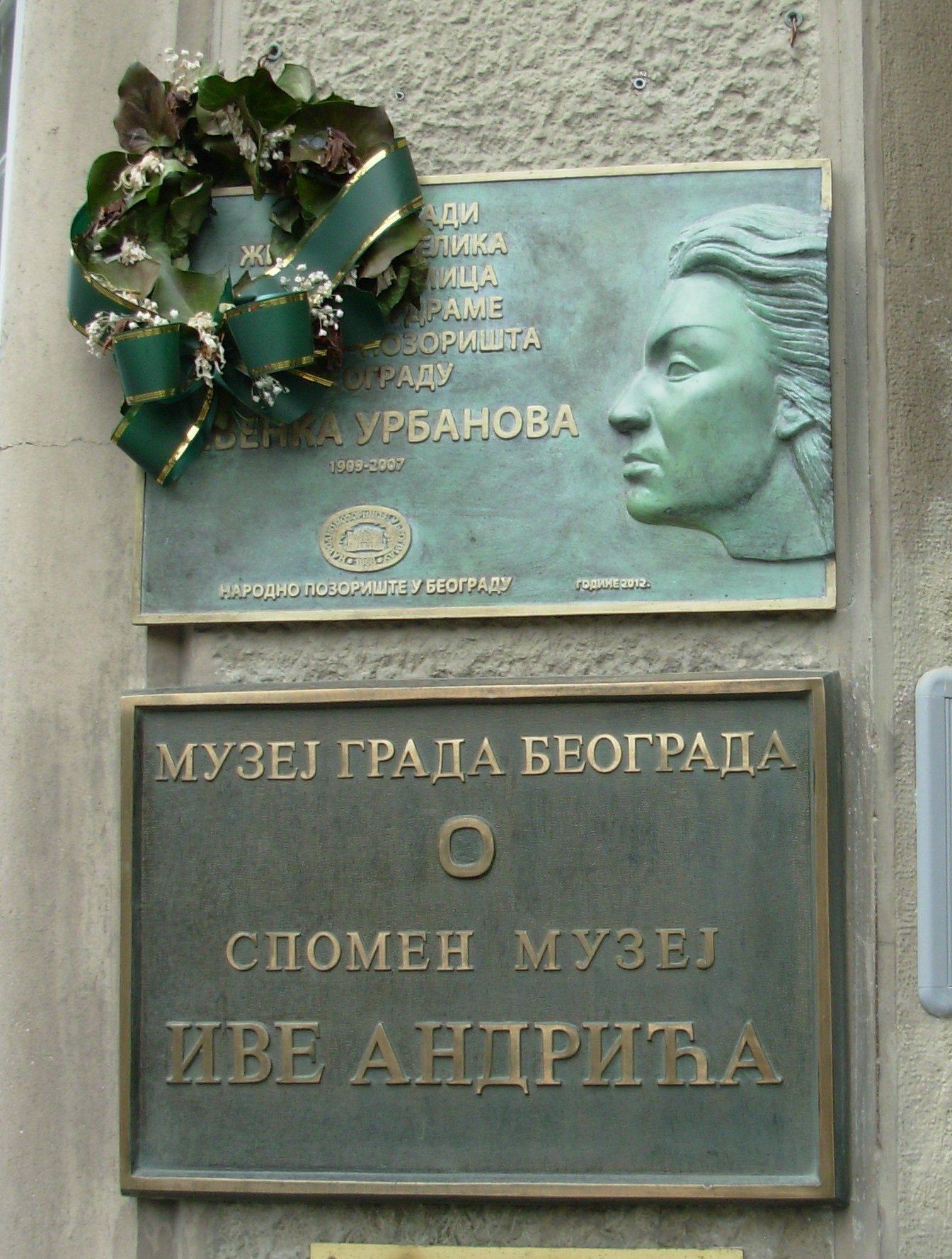
Memorial plaque at the Belgrade City Museum

Nevenka Urbanova was awarded the Serbian government for his role of Rina in Nušić's "Pokojnik", then first prize at the Festival of Radio and TV dramas in the Ljubljana for radio mono-drama "Lipton tea" in 1964. One of the most prestigious Serbian acting awards "Dobričin prsten" received in 1984. One of the winners of the Academy Award Ivo Andrić for 2005. year. In 1994. in the gallery of SANU opened the exhibition on the occasion of 125 anniversary of the National Theatre.

== Trivia ==
- "Dušan Jovanović Đukin, Nevenka's husband devoted most of his life, and artistic life also, to being her companion and friend to the last breath. He dedicated his images to her with subtle colors, as his love for Nevenka was also subtle and gentle." (Jovan Ćirilov).
- When she died she was the oldest Serbian professional actor. According to her wish the news of her death was announced three days later, on 10 January, after the cremation and funeral. News of her death was announced on RTS news, on 10 January 2007.
