= Strawberries in the Supermarket =

Jagoda in the Supermarket Jagoda u supermarketu (original title)
- DVD cover
- Directed by: Dušan Milić
- Written by: Dušan Milić
- Produced by: Emir Kusturica
- Starring: Srđan Todorović; Branka Katić
- Cinematography: Petar Popović
- Edited by: Svetolik Zajc
- Music by: Nele Karajlić; Dejo Šparavalo
- Distributed by: Fandango (Italy); Kinowelt Home Entertainment (Germany)
- Release date: 6 February 2003
- Running time: 83 min.
- Countries: Italy; Germany; Yugoslavia
- Language: Serbian
- Box office: €81,184

Jagoda in the Supermarket (Serbian: Јагода у супермаркету, Jagoda u supermarketu) is a 2003 Yugoslav action comedy film directed by Dušan Milić. The film won the first prime at the 2004 Cinequest Film Festival in San Jose, California. Branka Katić cast in the title role.

Jagoda in the Supermarket was screened at the Berlin Film Festival Perry Seibert, Rovi.

== Plot ==
Ex-soldier Marko storms into a supermarket and takes all the cashiers hostage because one of them insulted his grandmother. One of the cashiers is Jagoda, a self-conscious country girl in her late 20s or early 30s who thinks that she passed her "expiration date" long ago. A surreal situation jazzed with comedy stunts helps Marko and Jagoda find their places in the world.

== Cast ==
- Branka Katić as Jagoda Dimitrijević
- Srđan Todorović as Marko Kraljević
- Dubravka Mijatović as Ljubica
- Goran Radaković as Nebojša
- Danilo Lazović as SWAT Commander
- Mirjana Karanović as Supermarket owner
- Nikola Simić as assassin “Kobac”
- Zorka Manojlović as grandma

Rest of cast listed alphabetically

- Đorđe Branković as young policeman
- Stela Ćetković as Draga
- Branko Cvejić as Dragan
- Milan Đorđević as Medic
- Nina Grahovac as cashier
- Marko Jeremić as Limun
- Snežana Jeremić as cashier
- Božidar Stošić as older policeman
