= Rogojevac =

Rogojevac is a Serbian toponym that may refer to:

- Rogojevac (Prijepolje), a village in the municipality of Prijepolje, Serbia
- Rogojevac, Kragujevac, a village in the municipality of Kragujevac, Serbia
