= Moj rođak sa sela =

- Screenplay by: Radoslav Pavlović
- Directed by: Marko Marinković
- Starring: Vojin Ćetković; Dubravka Mijatović; Nikola Kojo; Dragan Jovanović; Vera Čukić; Nebojša Glogovac; Petar Božović; Jadranka Jovanović
- Theme music composer: Dragoljub Ilić
- Country of origin: Serbia
- Original language: Serbian
- No. of seasons: 2
- No. of episodes: 28

Production
- Production locations: Belgrade, Kragujevac, Vrnjačka Banja, Borač, a village near Knić
- Running time: 55 minutes
- Production company: Radio Television of Serbia

Original release
- Network: TV Belgrade
- Release: October 26, 2008 – February 13, 2011

Moj rođak sa sela (Serbian: Мој рођак са села; English: My cousin from the countryside) is a TV series program written by Radoslav Pavlović and co-produced by Radio Television of Serbia and Košutnjak Film. Two seasons, with a total of 28 episodes have been produced by now. The first episode aired in 2008 and the last in 2011.

Most of the plot takes place in a village in Šumadija, central Serbia. The series follows two parallel stories, the story of Malešević family, and the story of their cousin, a spy, Vranić. The plot contains a lot of humour and draws an image of the political reality of modern Serbia.

The series was very well received by the audience, and attracted a record audience reaching more than 3 million viewers per episode. It is one of the most successful TV series produced by Radio Television of Serbia in the past decade.
