= Olivera Jovićević =

Serbian journalist and television presenter (born 1966)

- Оливера Јовићевић
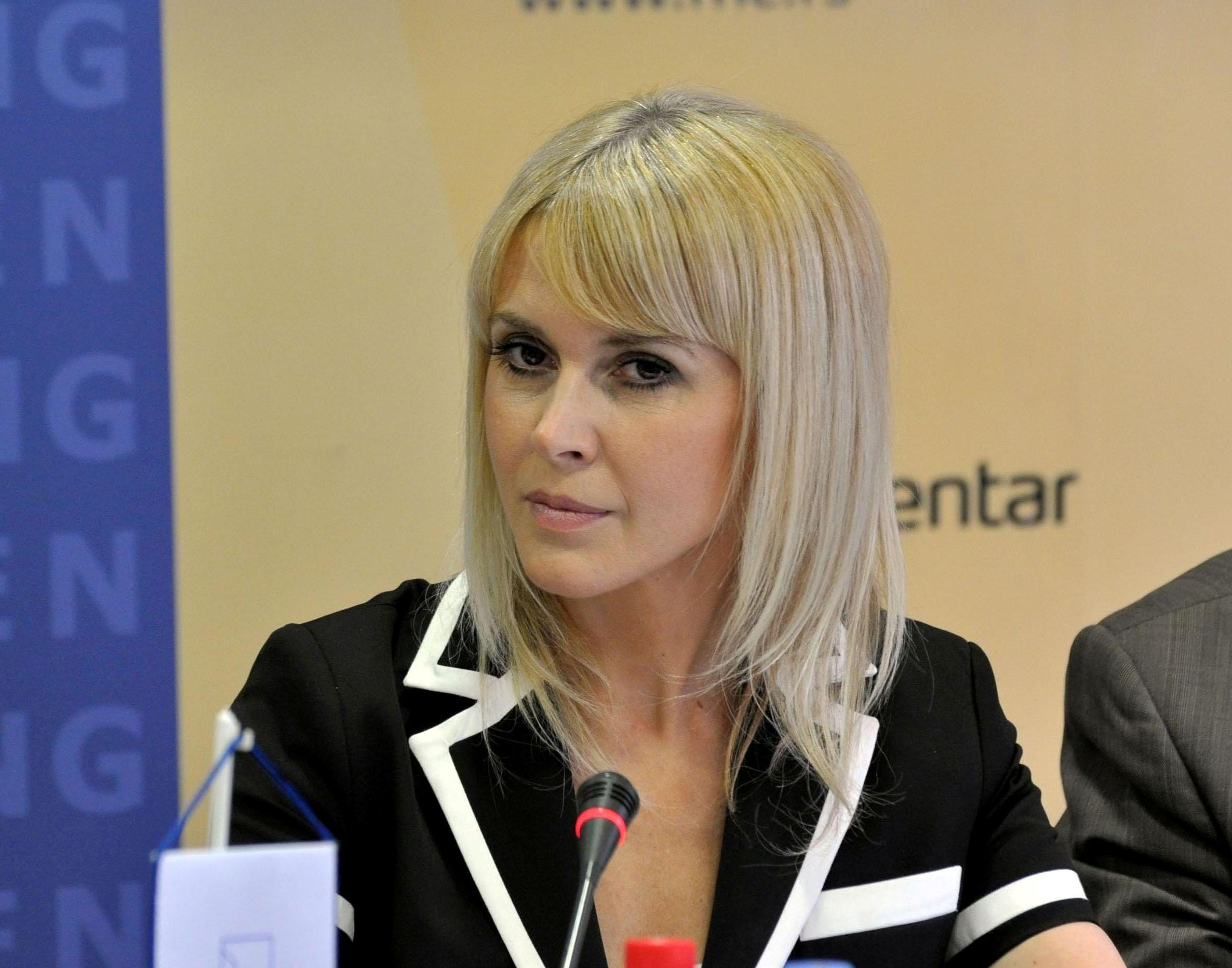
- Olivera Jovićević in 2013
- Born: 15 August 1966 (age 59); Bajina Bašta, SR Serbia, SFR Yugoslavia
- Education: Thirteenth Belgrade Gymnasium
- Alma mater: University of Belgrade
- Occupations: Journalist, television presenter
- Years active: 1990s–present
- Known for: Upitnik
- Television: Studio B (1990s); RTS (2004–2022)
- Children: 1

Olivera Jovićević (Serbian Cyrillic: Оливера Јовићевић; born 15 August 1966) is a Serbian journalist and television presenter best known as the longtime editor and host of the political talk show Upitnik on Radio Television of Serbia (RTS).

== Early life and education ==
Jovićević was born in Bajina Bašta, as the eldest of four sisters. Her father was a forestry engineer, while her mother was a homemaker.

Before starting high school, her family moved to Belgrade, where she attended the Thirteenth Belgrade Gymnasium, enrolling in the culture and information studies programme.

After unsuccessfully attempting to enroll at the Faculty of Dramatic Arts, she studied Yugoslav and world literature at the University of Belgrade Faculty of Philology.

While still a university student, Jovićević worked as a teacher of Serbian language in several secondary schools in Belgrade, including vocational and tourism schools.

== Career ==
Jovićević entered journalism during the 1990s, initially working in the news division of Studio B. According to her own account, she joined the station after being encouraged by colleague Ivan Cvetković to audition for a position in the newsroom.

During the 1990s, she also worked as political editor for the newspapers Blic and Glas javnosti. In interviews, she stated that she and other journalists were dismissed from their positions several times during that period.

In 2004, Jovićević joined Radio Television of Serbia (RTS) at the invitation of director-general Aleksandar Tijanić. She initially hosted the network's morning programme before becoming editor and presenter of the political talk show Upitnik.

As host of Upitnik, she moderated discussions involving Serbian government officials, opposition politicians, analysts and public figures. The programme became one of the best-known political debate shows on Serbian television.

In 2020, Jovićević was among the candidates considered for the position of director-general of RTS.

She left RTS in February 2022 after approximately 18 years with the broadcaster, announcing that she would continue working in television production and marketing.

== Public image ==
Jovićević has been one of the more recognizable political television hosts in Serbia. In interviews, she has commented on criticism from different political groups regarding her work and editorial approach, stating that she has at various times been accused of favouring both government and opposition positions.

== Personal life ==
Jovićević has one daughter, Dunja.

In interviews, Jovićević has spoken about personal tragedies experienced by her family during 2016 and 2017. She stated that her father died in 2016, while her former husband and the father of her daughter died in an accident the following year.

Following these events, she said that she had taken on the role of being "both father and mother" to her daughter.

She is an Orthodox Christian; her patron saint (krsna slava) is Saint Michael the Archangel (Aranđelovdan).
