= Mihailo Janketić =

Serbian actor (1938–2019)

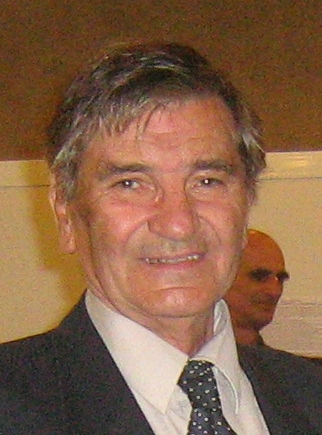
- Janketić in 2008
- Born: 24 May 1938; Novi Sad, Kingdom of Yugoslavia
- Died: 15 May 2019 (aged 80); Belgrade, Serbia
- Education: First Belgrade Gymnasium
- Alma mater: University of Belgrade Faculty of Dramatic Arts
- Children: 4

Mihailo "Miša" Janketić (Serbian Cyrillic: Михаило "Миша" Јанкетић; 24 May 1938 – 15 May 2019) was a Serbian actor of theater, film and television.

== Biography ==
He graduated in acting from the Academy of Theater, Film, Radio and Television in 1962. In his career, he played roles in dozens of films and TV series, and also played numerous roles in the Yugoslav Drama Theatre, of which he became a permanent member in 1960.

He participated as a student in a work action during the construction of the Zagreb–Ljubljana highway in 1958.

His great popularity with the television audience was brought by his roles in the TV series Sivi dom (1984–1985), Bolji život (1987–1991), Srećni ljudi (1993–1996), and in the series Porodično blago (1998–2002) where he played the main male role.

He received awards and recognitions such as the Dobričin prsten, Pavle Vuisić Award, Nušić Lifetime Achievement Award, Statuette of Joakim Vujić, four Sterija Awards, October Award of the City of Belgrade, Ćuran Statuette, Raša Plaović Award and two annual Yugoslav Drama Theatre awards.

He was a longtime professor of acting at the Academy of Arts in Novi Sad. He was married to Svjetlana Knežević with whom he had four children: Radomir, Marko, Iva and Milica.

Janketić died on 15 May 2019. He is interred in the Alley of Distinguished Citizens in the Belgrade New Cemetery.

== Personal life ==
He had four children, two of which are also actors.
