= Witness Out of Hell =

1966 film

- Directed by: Zika Mitrovic
- Written by: Frida Filipovic; Michael Mansfeld
- Produced by: Artur Brauner; Peter Hahne; Aleksander Krstic
- Starring: Irene Papas; Daniel Gélin; Heinz Drache
- Cinematography: Milorad Markovic
- Edited by: Ursula Kahlbaum; Katarina Stojanovic
- Music by: Vladimir Kraus-Rajteric
- Production companies: Avala Film; CCC Film
- Distributed by: J. Arthur Rank Film
- Release date: 1 March 1966
- Running time: 83 minutes
- Countries: West Germany; Yugoslavia
- Language: German

Witness Out of Hell (German: Zeugin aus der Hölle) is a 1966 West German-Yugoslavian drama film directed by Zika Mitrovic and starring Irene Papas, Daniel Gélin and Heinz Drache. It was shot at the Spandau Studios in West Berlin. The film's sets were designed by the art directors Miomir Denic, Aleksandar Milovic and Heinrich Weidemann.

== Synopsis ==
During the Second World War Lea Weiss, Jewish woman from Poland was forced to work in a brothel at Auschwitz and then was the victim of medical experiments. Twenty years later prosecutors at a war crimes tribunal hope she can be their stat witness in the trial of the perpetrators.

== Cast ==
- Irene Papas as Lea Weiss
- Daniel Gélin as Bora Petrovic
- Heinz Drache as Hoffmann
- Jean Claudio as Charlos Bianchi
- Werner Peters as Von Walden
- Radmila Gutesa as Elsa
- Petar Banicevic as Fischer
- Alice Treff as Frau von Keller
- Hans Zesch-Ballot as Dr. Berger
- Darko Tatic as Recepcioner Alfred
- Zorica Gajdas as Dama sa kucicima
- Nikola Jovanovic as Posetilac dame sa kucicima

== Bibliography ==
- Bartholomei, Lukas. Bilder von Schuld und Unschuld: Spielfilme über den Nationalsozialismus in Ost- und Westdeutschland. Waxmann Verlag, 2015.
- Bock, Hans-Michael & Bergfelder, Tim. The Concise CineGraph. Encyclopedia of German Cinema. Berghahn Books, 2009.
- Lewis, Ingrid. Women in European Holocaust Films: Perpetrators, Victims and Resisters. Springer International Publishing, 2018/
