= Vesna Čipčić =

Serbian actress

- Весна Чипчић
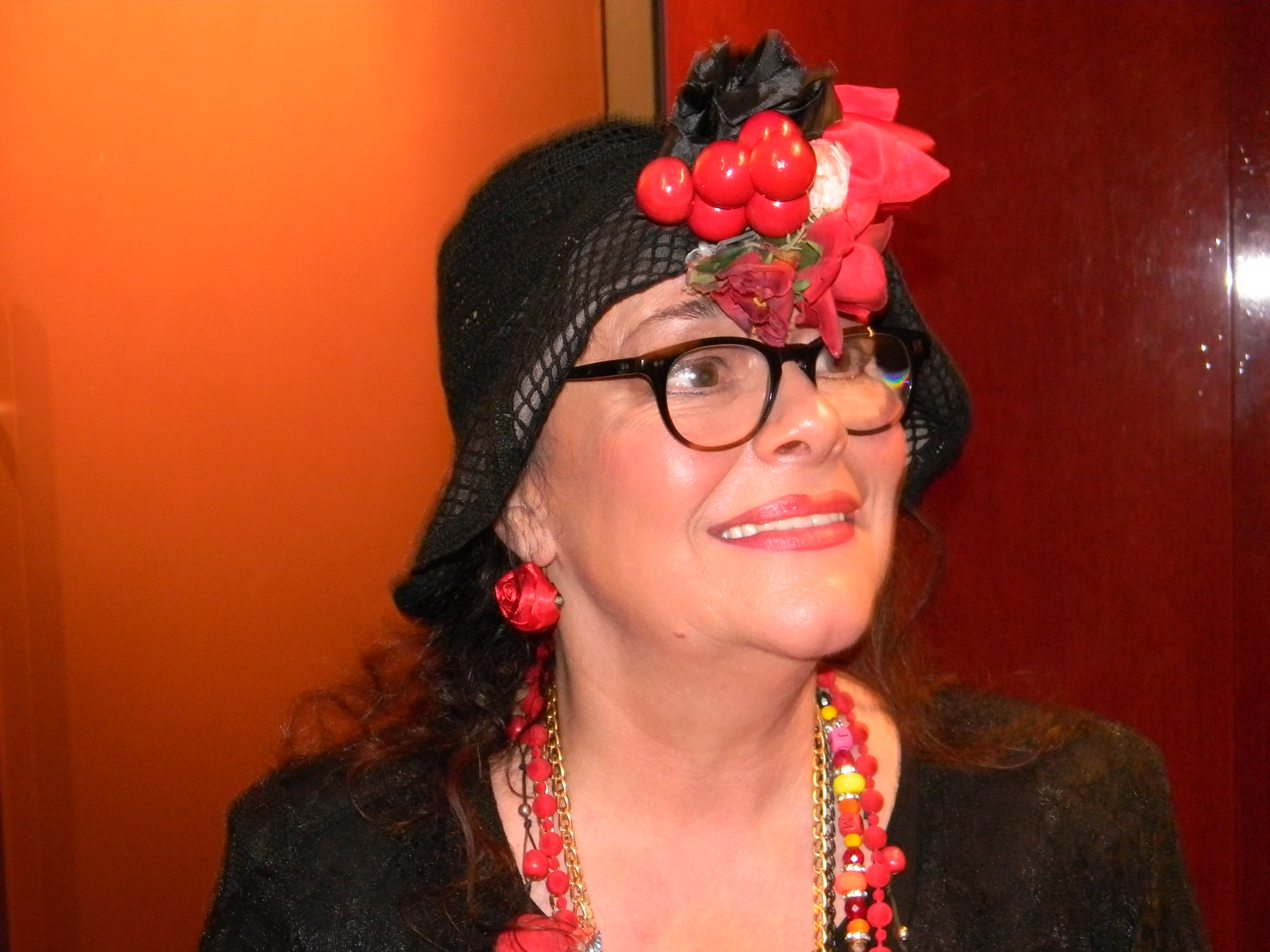
- Vesna Čipčić
- Born: 23 March 1954 (age 71); Kikinda, PR Serbia, FPR Yugoslavia
- Occupation: Actress

Vesna Čipčić (Serbian Cyrillic: Весна Чипчић; born 23 March 1954) is a Serbian actress. She was born in Kikinda. Actress Aleksandra Alač is her daughter.

== Filmography ==
- Džangrizalo (1976) as hotel maid
- Dva drugara (1976)
- Prvi garnizon (1976)
- Ljubav u jedanaestoj (1978)
- Kod Kamile as Kelnerica Rozika (1978)
- Sećam se (1979)
- Žestoke godine (1979)
- Avanture Borivoja Šurdilovića (1980) as Vesna Šurdilović
- Tren (1980)
- Sedam plus sedam as Vesna (1980)
- Vruć vetar as Vesna Šurdilović (1980)
- Samo za dvoje as Stjuardica Katarina (1981)
- Ljubi, ljubi, al' glavu ne gubi as Elza (1981)
- Kraljevski voz as Rule (1981)
- Pop Ćira i pop Spira as Melanija (1982)
- Kakav deda takav unuk as Elza (1982)
- Timočka buna (1983)
- Idi mi, dodji mi (1983) as Elza
- Ubi ili poljubi (1984)
- Šta se zgodi kad se ljubav rodi (1984)
- Memed My Hawk (film) (1984)
- Nema problema as nurse (1984)
- Žikina dinastija (1985)
- Tombola (1985)
- Ada as Vojka (1985)
- Sekula i njegove žene (1986)
- Ne znate vi Martina (1986)
- Osveta as Jelena (1986)
- Mister Dolar (1989)
- Žikina ženidba as Elza (1992)
- Three Tickets to Hollywood as teacher (1993)
- Pokondirena tikva (1996)
- Nikoljdan 1901. godine as Jovanka (1998)
- Zajedničko putovanje (2001)
- M(j)ešoviti brak as Vanja (2003)
- O štetnosti duvana (2004)
- Od danas do sutra (2006)
- Krv nije voda (2008)
- Professor Kosta Vujić's Hat (2012)
