= Bolji život =

Yugoslav television series (1987-1991)

- Members of the Popadić family.
- Created by: Mihajlo Vukobratović
- Starring: Marko Nikolić; Svetlana Bojković; Boris Komnenić; Lidija Vukićević; Dragan Bjelogrlić
- Country of origin: SFR Yugoslavia
- No. of seasons: 3
- No. of episodes: 82

Production
- Executive producer: Nenad Romano
- Running time: 40 minutes

Original release
- Network: TV Belgrade
- Release: January 10, 1987 – June 16, 1991

Bolji život (Serbian Cyrillic: Бољи живот, lit. 'A Better Life') is a Yugoslav television series with mixed elements of soap opera, comedy and drama that aired from 1987 to 1991. Created by the Radiotelevision Belgrade (RTB) it is considered to be the most successful television show ever produced in Yugoslavia.

Written by Serbian screenwriter Siniša Pavić, the series helped jumpstart cinematic careers for many of its protagonists, most notably Dragan Bjelogrlić who would go on to become a successful actor, director, and producer.

== History ==
Bolji život began airing on Radio Television of Belgrade on Saturday, 10 January 1987, opening with the "Ja hoću život" theme song written by Ljubiša Bačić, composed by Voki Kostić and sung by Dado Topić that would go on to become popular in its own right.

Early into its run, the series became a massive hit all over SFR Yugoslavia. The first season's final episode that aired on 6 June 1987, featuring a bit of a cliffhanger with Giga leaving the household, brought in huge ratings. A total of 22 episodes were shot and aired in the first season.

== Plot ==
The story revolves around the Popadić family and works through their personal struggles as well as their adaptation to the rapid political and economic changes taking place in the post-Tito SFR Yugoslavia during the late 1980s and early 1990s.

Family patriarch Dragiša Popadić a.k.a. Giga Moravac is a fiftysomething impulsive and outburst-prone administrator, employed as middle manager at the legal department of an unnamed state-owned company that produces unspecified product(s). A member of the Communist League (SKJ), he had moved to Belgrade from his rural Pomoravlje home more than three decades earlier in order to study at the University of Belgrade's Faculty of Law, staying in the city after graduation and eventually getting married and starting a family. His cultured and delicate wife Emilija Konstantinović—who comes from an affluent and highbrow Belgrade family of a pre-World War II state monopoly senior inspector (viši inspektor državnog monopola) in the Kingdom of Yugoslavia government administration—teaches Latin at a high school. Though most of her family's pre-war wealth has presumably been nationalized by the post-war communist authorities as Yugoslavia abruptly transitioned from a monarchy into a communist people's republic, they were able to hold onto a centrally located four-bedroom salon apartment, which Emilija eventually inherited and Giga moved into once they got married. The couple has three grownup children, each of whom still lives with their parents.

As the series starts, the eldest son Saša, a law school graduate, is unemployed; attractive daughter Violeta is trying to jump-start a stage acting career; and the younger son Boba is about to graduate high school though that's anything but certain as he's experiencing major struggles at school with poor grades and issues with authority. Meanwhile, Giga's and Ema's twenty-seven-year marriage is in turmoil as the couple bickers constantly, mostly due to their general socioeconomic/class incompatibility and perpetual lack of funds in the five-person household. As the series starts, their relationship is further strained—both emotionally and financially—by the death of Giga's older sister Jovanka as Giga has decided to go above and beyond the family's financial means in order to give his late sister a lavish funeral, which Ema disapproves of not just due to the high expense but mostly because she never got along with her sister-in-law. In turn, Ema decides to order an expensive Chinese rug without consulting her husband, which leads to a huge argument once the rug is delivered. Ema soon decides to serve Giga with divorce papers. This comes as a terrible blow to Giga, weeks after the death of his sister.

The deceased sister's will is soon revealed, outlining the inheritance terms of her YUD60,120,000 (~US$130,000) legacy. It stipulates that each of her brother's kids stands to inherit YUD20 million (~US$43,000) under specific conditions: Saša has to find a job, Violeta has to get married and celebrate a one-year anniversary, while Boba has to complete his final year of high school with at least a 4 (very good) grade average.

Her will further requests that the remaining YUD120,000 (~US$260) be used by her brother Giga in order to finance the erection of a black marble tombstone with a picture from her younger days on her grave.

=== First season ===
At one of their first divorce court dates, on judge's advice, Giga and Ema agree to put the legal divorce proceedings on hold for three months, giving themselves more time to attempt reconciliation.

In parallel, the kids are trying to meet the conditions of aunt Jovanka's testament. Viki seems to be in the best position to collect the money as her longtime boyfriend, architect Filip, is very much intent on getting married. He has got an apartment lined up through his company, though his patience with her is wearing thin and he is very much against her decision to give theater acting yet another shot.

Saša is in a three-year relationship with bookish medical doctor Branka, but his job prospects are bleak. It has been a year since he graduated law school with average grades and he still has not been able to land a job. Numerous rejections are starting to affect his self-confidence and he is beginning to feel inadequate in front of Branka who had graduated medicine with top marks the same year he did, but, unlike him, right away got hired for a cardiologist position that she is now excelling at. Furthermore, Branka's parents, especially mother, rarely miss an opportunity to tell him about it. At the employment bureau counter, he meets a flirty and mouthy clerk Koka who chats him up. For his part, he seems very receptive to her relaxed, direct, slightly low-brow, and provocative approach as she seems a polar opposite of his strait-laced girlfriend Branka. While out with Branka one day at a bar, Koka bumps into two of them, saying a flirty hello to Saša followed by a testy chat with Branka who is completely rattled by this encounter.

Meanwhile, Boba's task of graduating with a 4 (very good) average seems monumental as he currently has 1s (insufficient) in four of his subjects. His atrocious performance in school brings both Giga and Ema, on separate occasions to discuss matters and work out a game plan with Boba's home room professor Dušan "Terminator" Marković. During one of these visits Ema and Terminator realize they know each other vaguely from years ago, and, though they are both now married, take an obvious shine to one another.

Viki surprisingly manages to pass her theater audition, though it is obvious the reason for the sudden success is jury member Baron being taken with her attractive looks. Though she is ecstatic, Filip is not thrilled with the development and is especially unhappy about the celebrated theater actor and multiple divorcee Baron now wooing his girlfriend, with Viki even welcoming the aging lothario's smooth advances. Frustrated, Filip even contacts Ema hoping to receive some help getting through to Viki whose head is high in the clouds. For the moment at least, Giga and Ema manage to impart some rationality to their daughter, and she seems ready to take the sensible option and make nice with Filip. In parallel, in order to sweeten his case with Viki, Baron arranges for her, a complete novice, to get the demanding role of Juliet in the theater's latest production of Shakespeare's Romeo and Juliet, while Baron plays Romeo. He tells her the big news by showing up unannounced at the apartment just as she is getting ready to go out to meet Filip for a date. The news sends her on cloud nine and she immediately puts Filip and the marriage on the back-burner while Filip's frustration grows. Soon, Baron manages to bed Viki who thus becomes his latest conquest. Though not aware of the gory details yet, Filip has seen enough to send him over the edge and, overcome with jealousy, he constantly interrupts their rehearsals. It all culminates in an act of madness as he breaks into Baron's apartment with a gun, threatening to kill him, but the verbose actor talks him out of it using a combination of pointed eloquence and dramatic flair.

Based on their few run-ins, Saša is sufficiently intrigued with Koka that he tracks her down and ends up sleeping with her in her apartment. Afterwards, he informs her that he does not want to pursue things further, which she takes in stride to his face, passing it all off as a light fling, but looks visibly shaken after he leaves. He decides to stay with Branka and is soon informed by her that she is pregnant so the parents quickly set about organizing a wedding. Meanwhile, Giga decides to call on his Pomoravlje paisano connections in order to find Saša a job. He wants to track down his old friend Jataganac who is now a powerful politically connected, SKJ-installed business manager. Though he manages to get Jataganac's attention after much wrangling, the whole thing eventually goes pear-shaped when Giga refuses to swallow his pride when Jataganac shows up four hours late to the dinner at Popadić's house.

Boba's grades gradually begin improving while Ema starts seeing Terminator regularly as they seem to be in the beginning stages of an affair. Giga who does not suspect much yet starts getting close to his secretary Dara and ends up sleeping with her one day.

Preparations for Saša's and Branka's wedding are anything but smooth as the in-laws are unable to agree on who picks up the tab. Finally, everything is ironed out and the civil ceremony takes place in front of the two sets of families, including Giga and Ema, Viki and Baron (now an official item), and drunken Boba. However, there is a scandal when Branka sees Koka who unknowingly got brought along to the wedding party by her half-sister who is visiting from Switzerland and knows Branka's father.

Viki's theater goes to Vrnjačka Banja for the pre-premiere staging of Romeo and Juliet. Though the production is largely shambolic, she catches the eye of an amorous Italian director who begins showering her with attention, praise, and vague promises right in front of jealous Baron. Unbeknownst to her, Filip has also followed her down to Vrnjačka Banja in a desperate attempt to get her back, so three of her suitors are now fighting over her. Intrigued by the Italian, she runs off with him leaving two jilted lovers in her wake.

Viki soon leaves for Rome to join her new Italian beau while her parents Giga and Ema's marriage is close to disintegration with contentious discovery session at the divorce court and requests for Terminator as well as Dara's husband to come in and provide testimony. Giga's work situation is just as bad with a general strike brewing in the company. Meanwhile, after getting the summons notice for the court, Dara's husband shows up at her apartment and manages to work out a deal with her whereby she lets him stay in return for not providing court testimony that could potentially be damaging to Giga.

The season ends with Giga and Ema getting into a vicious argument that prompts furious and emotional Giga to demonstratively move out of the apartment.

=== Second season ===
After going to Dara's in search of room and board, only to find her estranged-yet-recently-moved-in husband there, Giga returns home. Meanwhile, Viki has also returned from Rome as her relationship with the Italian broke off almost immediately after she had moved in with him.

Some episodes are especially interesting and display these social changes. An example is when all the women go on strike in a company because they are not happy with the rights they get within their union while the male director of the company frantically tries to solve the situation and realises he can do nothing without these women.

The show also focuses on family relations, affairs and teen immaturity. The comedy often is created by the teen character Slobodan "Boba" Popadić (played by Dragan Bjelogrlić). The show can be described as a real life drama mixed with humorous adventures.

== Cast ==
=== Casting process ===
According to the series creator Pavić, the male lead role of Giga Moravac was intended for actor Marko Nikolić all along. The female lead role of Ema Popadić, however, was first offered to Vera Čukić who rejected it, at which point someone within the production team suggested Svetlana Bojković who accepted.

Furthermore, Pavić wrote the role of the main family's oldest son Aleksandar Popadić specifically for twenty-seven-year-old Žarko Laušević who eventually had to drop out due to commitments on a movie he had been shooting. At that point, the role went to twenty-nine-year-old Boris Komnenić.

The role of the middle sibling, daughter Viki Popadić, was originally offered to twenty-six-year-old Ena Begović who reportedly rejected it due to wanting to focus on her theatrical work. The role went to twenty-four-year-old Lidija Vukićević, instead.

Thirty-one-year-old Dara Džokić was the one first offered the supporting role of Saša Popadić's professionally inclined medical doctor wife Branka Pavlović, however, due to Džokić's theater commitments as well as her skepticism about the series' commercial viability, the actress turned it down. The role went to thirty-one-year-old Ljiljana Blagojević.

The femme fatale role of the kafana singer Nina Andrejević who becomes the object of Boba Popadić's infatuation and desire was initially offered to the twenty-six-year-old Yugoslav folk superstar Lepa Brena who had already appeared in an earlier Pavić production, feature film Tesna koža, five years prior. This time, she turned the offer down due to having her own star vehicle film Hajde da se volimo in production and coming out soon. Instead, the role went to the thirty-four-year-old folk singer Snežana Savić.

=== Popadić family ===
- Dragiša "Giga-Moravac" Popadić (played by Marko Nikolić)
- Emilija "Ema" Popadić née Konstantinović (played by Svetlana Bojković)
- Aleksandar "Saša-Guza" Popadić (played by Boris Komnenić)
- Violeta "Viki" Popadić (played by Lidija Vukićević)
- Slobodan "Boba" Popadić (played by Dragan Bjelogrlić)
- Kosta Pavlović (played by Predrag Laković), Ema's maternal uncle

=== Pavlović family ===
- Branka Pavlović (played by Ljiljana Blagojević), Saša's girlfriend who becomes his wife, gets pregnant with his baby, miscarries, and goes to France for specialization)
- Mirko Pavlović (played by Miroslav Bijelić)
- Duda Pavlović (played by Ljiljana Sedlar)

=== Đorđević family ===
- Vlastimir Đorđević, MSc (played by Vlasta Velisavljević)
- Savka "Buba" Radović-Đorđević (played by Olivera Marković)
- Lela Marković (played by Ljiljana Lašić)
- Dušan "Terminator" Marković (played by Voja Brajović), Lela's husband and Boba's math and physics professor who has a fling with Ema

=== Other characters ===
- Koviljka "Koka" Stanković (played by Jelica Sretenović), chatty and flirtatious girl who works at the unemployment bureau before becoming a secretary at Zavod za usklađivanje and eventually ending up at Balkanpromet. She has a son out of wedlock with Saša Popadić
- Božidar "Jataganac" Soldatović (played by Josif Tatić), powerful politically connected CEO
- Stevan "Stevica" Kurčubić (played by Ivan Bekjarev), corrupt top-level manager at various state-owned enterprises including crumbling export-import company Balkanpromet
- Biberović (played by Mirko Bulović), top-level manager at Popadić's company after Kurčubić left, he ends up marrying Dara after her fling with Popadić
- Jezdimir Uskoković (sometimes Bošković) (played by Dušan Poček), Koka's co-worker at Zavod and later landlord
- Ivo Lukšić (played by Aljoša Vučković), medical doctor who becomes Viki's husband, then divorcee, and finally after a short fling with Lela ends up going to Zimbabwe with Viki
- Lujo Lukšić (played by Boris Dvornik), Ivo's father from Split
- Živadinka "Žarka" Žikić (sometimes Šijaković) (played by Radmila Savićević), Giga Popadić's secretary after Dara left
- Darinka "Dara" Zavišić (played by Gorica Popović), Giga Popadić's secretary with whom he has a short affair
- Ljubomir "Ljuba" Zavišić (played by Ljubiša Samardžić), Dara's ex-husband
- Ljubiša Branković (played by Miodrag Petrović Čkalja), driver at Giga Popadić's company
- Nina Andrejević (played by Snežana Savić), well-known folk singer, she's object of Boba's affection, Kurčubić's mistress, and later Jataganac's short-time trophy wife
- Aleksandar "Macola" Kostić (played by Bata Živojinović), tombstone maker, later owner of fast food kiosks, at one point interested in buying Balkanpromet and turning it into an upscale restaurant
- Andrija "Kamenjar" Kostić, Boba's high school classmate and Macola's son
- Radujković (played by Petar Kralj), Giga's lawyer
- Dušanka "Buba" Majković (sometimes Eleonora Majković) aka Spečena (played by Ljiljana Stjepanović),
- Đoka Ciganović (played by Mihajlo Viktorović), timid employee at Balkanpromet
- Leposava Ciganović (played by Eva Ras), Ciganović's wife
- Seka Sekulović (played by Seka Sablić), employee at Balkanpromet
- Božidar Majković (played by Taško Načić), employee at Balkanpromet
- Maja "Ortak" Magdić (played by Branka Katić), Boba's high school classmate
- Filip (played by Čedomir Petrović), Viki's architect boyfriend who wants to marry her but she's apprehensive due to wanting to pursue her acting career
- Svetislav "Baron" Baronov (played by Miloš Žutić), pompous theater actor and Viki's suitor
- Giancarlo Marotti (played by Milan Gutović), Italian film director and Viki's suitor
- Finka Pašalić (played by Mira Furlan), an employee at Giga's company who gets him in trouble at the customs
- Đorđe Pašalić (played by Dragan Nikolić), Finka's explosive and abusive husband
- Dejan Milićević (played by Milan Štrljić), lawyer who represents Viki in her divorce proceedings as well as Đorđe Pašalić in his lawsuit against Giga Popadić
- Sanja Marinković (played by Dubravka Mijatović), problematic teenager who's a student of Ema's
- Ružica (played by Rozalija Levai), Jataganac's loyal secretary whom he eventually impregnates and promises to marry
- Bogdan Bekčić (played by Boro Stjepanović), gastarbeiter who came back to Yugoslavia and is interested in buying and reorganizing Balkanpromet
- Ivona (played by Milica Milša), Saša Popadić's secretary and soon fiancée
- Rapajić (played by Predrag Milinković), Jataganac's politically connected ally
- Miroljub "Rile Pas" Ristić (played by Aleksandar Hrnjaković), Giga's paisano from Veliko Pomoravlje
- Veselin "Mile Pile" Milić (played by Milorad Mandić), Boba's business partner after he collects the will money
- Đukan Vukotić (played by Darko Tomović), Boba's Montenegrin friend from JNA
- Štef Balenović (played by Nikola Kojo), Boba's Croatian friend from JNA
- Halid Omerović (played by Goran Radaković), Boba's Bosnian friend from JNA
- Jože Lipovšek (played by Dragan Petrović), Boba's Slovenian friend from JNA
- Medicinski brat (played by Adem Čejvan), male nurse of medical doctor Lukšić

== Reruns and ratings ==
The show has been rerun on RTS multiple times after its original run ended in 1991. In 2007 it was re-run once again on RTS 1. The show is sometimes re-run in other parts of the former Yugoslavia as well.

The show's reruns brought in huge ratings for RTS during its dark days of the 1990s. In February 2007, the series' rerun was the third most-watched show on Serbian television with 23.3% of the public tuning in to watch the repeats of the show.

Numerous reruns of the show led to a resurgence of popularity for some of its protagonists. In fall 2011, twenty years after Bolji život stopped airing, the recognizability of Marko Nikolić and Svetlana Bojković, the actors who portrayed the main Popadić couple, was still such that the Agrokor-owned supermarket chain Idea hired them for a Serbian-market television commercial, which they did in character as Giga Moravac and Ema and partly shot in the original apartment where the series was taped. In December 2011, the two appeared as guests for an entire episode of Veče sa Ivanom Ivanovićem, the most-watched television talk show in Serbia, where they mostly discussed Bolji život. The television commercial proved popular so they did another one, again in character, in February 2012.

Croatian television network Doma TV bought the entire run of Bolji život (82 episodes) in fall 2012. On 5 November 2012, it started rerunning it to record ratings in the country despite airing in the same time slot opposite Turkish first-run soap opera Muhteşem Yüzyıl about Suleyman the Magnificent on the rival RTL Televizija.

On 16 January 2013, twenty-six years after the series' original run, RTS began the ninth rerun cycle of Bolji život.

It was also aired in Bosnia and Herzegovina often since 2015 via state-owned TV network FTV.

== See also ==
- Radio Television of Serbia
