= Unseen Wonder =

1984 film

- Directed by: Živko Nikolić
- Screenplay by: Siniša Pavić
- Starring: Savina Geršak
- Cinematography: Stanislav Szomolányi
- Release date: 26 January 1984
- Running time: 92 minutes
- Country: Yugoslavia
- Language: Serbo-Croatian

Unseen Wonder (Serbian: Чудо невиђено, translit. Čudo neviđeno) is a 1984 Yugoslav comedy film written by Siniša Pavić and directed by Živko Nikolić. It was entered into the 14th Moscow International Film Festival where it won the Silver Prize.

== Cast ==
- Savina Geršak as Amerikanka
- Dragan Nikolić as Karuzo
- Boro Begović as Đoko
- Petar Božović as Zeljo
- Veljko Mandić as Zeljo's father
- Taško Načić as Baro
- Vesna Pećanac as Krstinja
- Boro Stjepanović as Soro
- Danilo 'Bata' Stojković as Gazda Šćepan
- Bata Živojinović as Father Makarije
