= Vruć vetar =

- Starring: Ljubiša Samardžić; Bora Todorović; Miodrag Petrović Čkalja; Radmila Savićević; Vesna Čipčić; Žika Milenković
- Country of origin: SFR Yugoslavia
- No. of seasons: 1
- No. of episodes: 10

Production
- Running time: 55 minutes

Original release
- Network: TV Belgrade
- Release: 6 January – 10 March 1980

Vruć vetar (Serbian Cyrillic: Врућ ветар, lit. 'Hot Wind') is a Yugoslav television series that aired in 1980. The series and the film, which was cut from scenes of the show, Avanture Borivoja Šurdilovića (Serbian Cyrillic: Авантуре Боривоја Шурдиловића, lit. 'The Adventures of Borivoje Šurdilović'), were also popular in neighbouring countries (Hungary, Romania and Bulgaria, as well as in Czechoslovakia). The main theme was titled "A sad adio", and it was performed by Slavko Bešić Čupa, Dragan Stojnić and others.

== Plot ==
The show follows the adventures of Šurda, a man in his mid-thirties from Vlasotince who comes to Belgrade to work and get rich. In Belgrade, he lives in a small house with his grandmother and Uncle Firga, a retired mason. Šurda buys a local barbershop. However, the job does not suit him abd so Šurda sells the barbershop and buys a car to become a taxi driver. He is not successful in this job either abd so Šurda, after listening to Bob's story about better life abroad, decides to become gastarbeiter, a guest worker in Germany.

However, none of the jobs that he finds is right for him and so he is forced to return to Yugoslavia. There, he meets Vesna, an attractive stewardess, and the couple eventually get married. Firga succeeds in employing Šurda in his former construction firm. There, Šurda, with a little cheating, wins a flat that the company gives for its own workers, but after some internal problems within the company, Šurda is forced to fight for the flat. Eventually, Firga is awarded a new flat and so the whole family settle to a new home. However, it finds that the new flat is occupied by Pera, a homeless chemist.

== Cast ==
- Ljubiša Samardžić — Borivoje Šurdilović "Šurda"
- Bora Todorović — Slobodan Mihajlović "Bob", Šurda's friend and "partner"
- Miodrag Petrović Čkalja — Blagoje Popović "Firga", Šurda's uncle
- Radmila Savićević — Šurda's Granny
- Žika Milenković — Sotir Šurdilović "Soća", Šurda's father
- Vesna Čipčić — Vesna Šurdilović, Šurda's wife
- Ljubica Ković — Šurda's mother
- Dragomir Bojanić Gidra — Krstivoje, Šurda's partner
- Čedomir Petrović — Pera

== Episode list ==
1. Čovek na pogrešnom mestu (A Man in the Wrong Place) — 6 January 1980
2. Taksista (A Taxidriver) — 13 January 1980
3. Gastarbajter (Gastarbeiter) — 20 January 1980
4. Kobni susret (The Fatal Encounter) — 27 January 1980
5. Bračni vir (Marriage Whirl) — 3 February 1980
6. Stan (Flat) — 10 February 1980
7. Na barikadama (On Barricades) — 17 February 1980
8. Pronalazak (The Invention) — 24 February 1980
9. Brodolom (Shipwreck) — 3 March 1980
10. Šampion (The Champion) — 10 March 1980
