= Petar Banićević =

Serbian actor

- Петар Банићевић
- Born: 8 February 1930; Nikšić, Kingdom of Yugoslavia
- Died: 4 September 2006 (aged 76); Belgrade, Serbia
- Occupation: Actor
- Years active: 1960–2004

Petar Banićević (Serbian Cyrillic: Петар Банићевић; 8 February 1930 – 4 September 2006) was a Serbian actor.

The "Petar Banićević" award is given annually by the National Theatre in Belgrade to a young actor under 40 years of age who excels artistically.

== Selected filmography ==
=== Film ===
Year	Title	Role	Notes
1963	Man and Beast	Stani	
1966	Witness Out of Hell	Fischer	
1980	Snovi, zivot, smrt Filipa Filipovica	Ministar	
1982	13 jul.	Major Petar Rajevic	
1989	Najbolji	Mejrin otac	
1993	Three Tickets to Hollywood	Tymoshenko	

=== Television ===
Year	Title	Role	Notes
1966	Crni sneg	Doktor Jovan Stamenkovic	TV series; 10 episodes
1966	Ljudi i papagaji	Giletov sin Pale	TV series; 5 episodes
1971	Cedomir Ilic	King Alexander Obrenovic	TV series; 3 episodes
1974	Zasto je pucao Alija Alijagic	Drzavni tuzilac	TV movie
1988	Vuk Karadzic	Mitropolit Josif Rajacic	TV series; 2 episodes
1993–1996	Srecni ljudi	Doktor Vulovic	TV series; 8 episodes

== Accolades ==
- In December 2004, he received the Life Achievement Award "Dobričin prsten" for his roles in Yugoslav theatres.
