= Radmila Savićević =

Serbian and Yugoslav actress (1926–2001)

- Радмила Савићевић
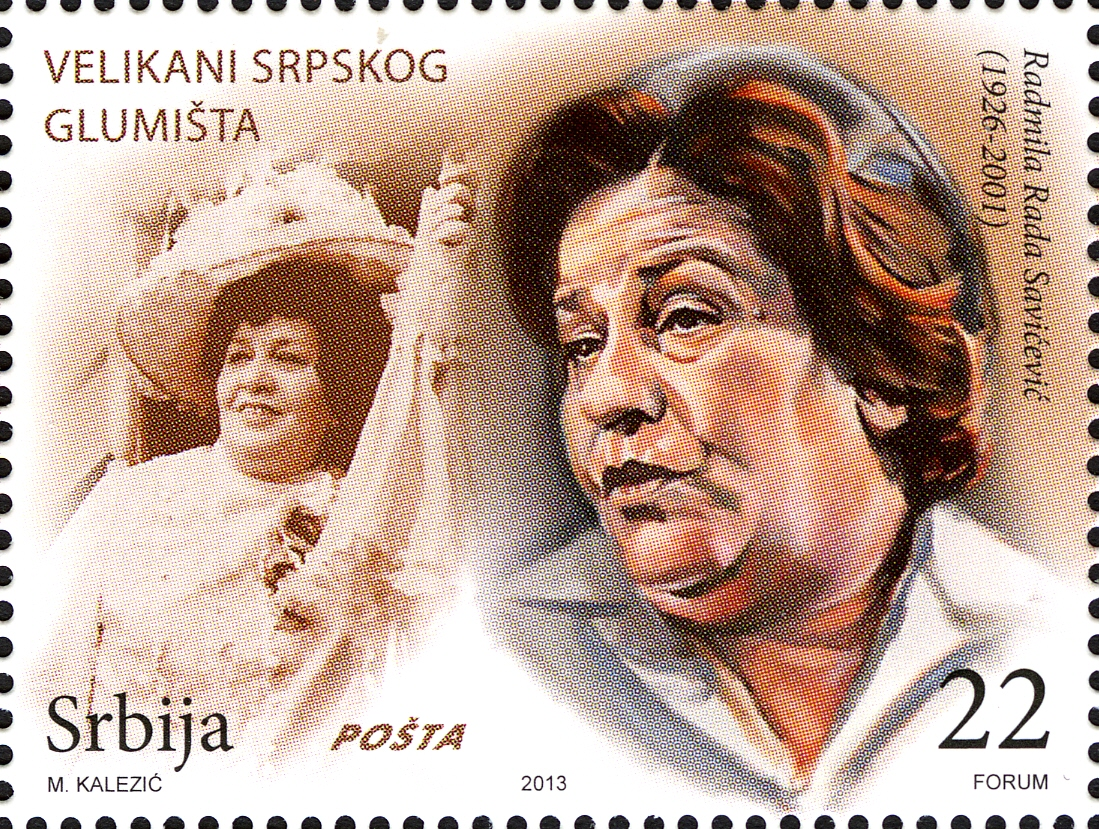
- Savićević on a stamp issued in 2013
- Born: 8 February 1926; Kruševac, Kingdom of Serbs, Croats and Slovenes
- Died: 8 November 2001 (aged 75); Belgrade, FR Yugoslavia
- Occupation: Actor
- Years active: 1961–2000
- Spouse: Božidar Savićević

Radmila Savićević (Serbian Cyrillic: Радмила Савићевић; 8 February 1926 – 8 November 2001) was a Serbian actress. She appeared in more than sixty films from 1961 to 2000.

== Biography ==
Radmila Savićević, born Radmila Milenković in 1926 in Kruševac, Serbia, was a beloved Yugoslav and Serbian actress. Raised by her single mother, a seamstress, Radmila began her acting career with the Kruševac Theatre and later joined the National Theatre in Niš in 1947. Despite a brief return to her hometown, she became a permanent member of the Niš Theatre in 1956, performing in over 40 plays.

Though she wanted to Sarajevo, she declined an offer from Meša Selimović, then director of the Sarajevo National Theatre. She became known for her strong stage presence in comedies and classical roles, including works by Molière and Gorky.

Radmila moved to Belgrade in the 1950s, where she transitioned into film and television, with early roles in movies like Mica i Mikica (1961) and Višnja na Tašmajdanu. In 1973, she gained national fame as Violeta in the hit TV series Kamiondžije, acting alongside Miodrag Petrović Čkalja and Pavle Vuisić. Her character, a strong-willed but kind-hearted village woman, became iconic.

Another notable achievement was her role as Vuka Petrović in Pozorište u kući, a long-running series from 1972 to 1984. Her portrayal of the rustic yet warm-hearted mother-in-law gained her a high reverence to viewers, as she became known as "a TV mother of the nation.”

In 1977, she starred as the grandmother Tomana in Babino unuče, a children’s series by Timothy John Byford. The role solidified her as a national favorite, especially among younger audiences.

Her final notable TV role was in the popular 1990s series Srećni ljudi, playing the no-nonsense grandmother Ristana “Riska” Golubović, whose sharp wit and heart of gold made her one of the most quoted characters in Serbian television history.

== Personal life ==
Savićević was married to Božidar Savićević up until her death in 2001. They had no children together. Božidar died in January 2003 and was buried next to Savićević.

During the 1990s Savićević was a strong opponent to Yugoslav wars, stating: "Everything that is happening right now makes me truly sad."

== Death ==
Savićević died in Belgrade on November 8, 2001. She was 75.

== Selected filmography ==
Year	Title	Role	Notes
2000	Shadows of Memories	Neighbor	
1993–1996	Srećni ljudi	Ristana "Riska" Golubović	TV series
1988–1991	Bolji život	Živadinka "Žarka" Šijaković	TV series
1984	Strangler vs. Strangler	Mica Mojsilović	
1980	Vruć vetar	Šurda's grandma	TV series
1978	The Tiger	Tamara's mother	
1977	Special Education	Neighbor	
1973	Paja i Jare	Violeta	
