= Živko Nikolić =

Montenegrin film director (1941–2001)

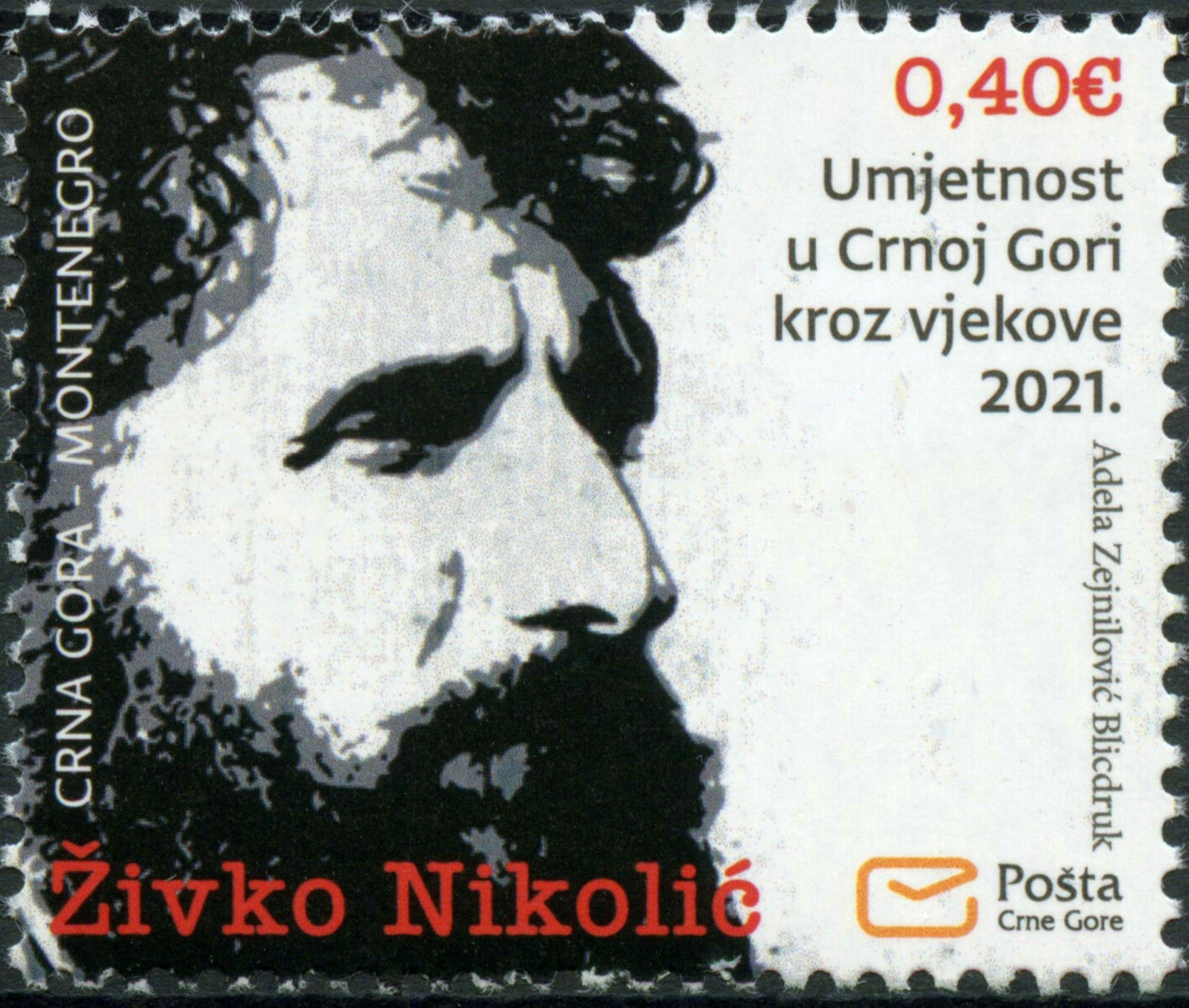
- Nikolić on a 2021 stamp of Montenegro
- Born: 20 November 1941; Ozrinići, Nikšić, Montenegro
- Died: 17 August 2001 (aged 59); Belgrade, Serbia, FR Yugoslavia
- Occupation: Film director
- Years active: 1968–1995

Živko Nikolić (Cyrillic: Живко Николић; 20 November 1941 – 17 August 2001) was a Montenegrin film director.

== Biography ==
Živko Nikolić was born in Ozrinići, Nikšić municipality in today's Montenegro, in 1941. He graduated from the Art School in Herceg Novi where he was trained as a painter of ceramics which contributed to his specific perception of the film. He died on 17 August 2001 in Belgrade. His 1984 film Unseen Wonder was entered into the 14th Moscow International Film Festival where it won the Silver Prize.

== Filmography ==
- Sebi za života (1968) documentary short
- Blaženi mirotvorci (1968) documentary short
- Trag (1971) documentary short
- Čačanski neimari (1971) documentary short
- Ždrijelo (1972) documentary short
- Polaznik (1973) documentary short
- Bauk (1974) documentary short
- Aerodrom Rijeka (1974) documentary short
- Marko Perov (1975) documentary short
- Prozor (1976) documentary short
- Beštije (1977) ... aka Beasts
- Oglav (1977)
- Ine (1978)
- Jovana Lukina (1979)
- Krvava svadba na Brzavi (1980) (TV)
- Ane (1980)
- Graditelj (1980)
- Biljeg (1981)
- Smrt gospodina Goluže (1982) ... aka Smrť pána Golužu
- Čudo neviđeno (1984) ... aka Unseen Wonder
- Lepota poroka (1986) ... aka The Beauty of Vice
- U ime naroda (1987) ... aka In the Name of the People
- To ka' uvati ne pušta (1988) (TV)
- "Đekna još nije umrla, a ka' će ne znamo" (1988) TV Series
- Iskušavanje đavola (1989)
- Ukleti brod (1990) ... aka Cursed Ship
- "Oriđinali" (1995) (mini) TV Series
- Uspavanka " (1995)
- In Search of the Miraculous (1998)
