= Branislav Jerinić =

Serbian actor (1932–2006)

- Born: 20 March 1932; Kragujevac, Yugoslavia
- Died: 27 June 2006 (aged 74); Belgrade, Serbia
- Occupation: Actor
- Years active: 1958-2003

Branislav "Ciga" Jerinić (20 March 1932 – 27 June 2006) was a Serbian actor. He appeared in more than ninety films from 1958 to 2003. He was married to actress Slavka Jerinic (1931-1997).

== Selected filmography ==
Year	Title	Role	Notes
1958	The Sky Through the Trees		
1964	March on the Drina	Aleksa	
1965	Three	Komandir	
1972	The Master and Margaret		
1993	Three Tickets to Hollywood	Spasoje	
