= Srećni ljudi =

- Created by: Milovan Vitezović
- Starring: Desimir Stanojević; Tanja Bošković; Zlata Numanagić; Dubravka Mijatović; Jugoslava Drašković; Svetislav Goncić; Velimir Bata Živojinović; Radmila Savićević; Nikola Simić
- Country of origin: FR Yugoslavia
- Original language: Serbian
- No. of seasons: 2
- No. of episodes: 70

Production
- Executive producers: Petar Galović; Zoran Janković
- Running time: 40 minutes

Original release
- Network: TV Belgrade
- Release: 12 September 1993 – 30 June 1996

Srećni ljudi (Serbian Cyrillic: Срећни људи, lit. 'Happy People') is a Serbian TV series that aired from 1993 to 1996. Created by the Radio Television of Belgrade (RTB), it is the first Serbian TV show ever produced after the breakup of SFR Yugoslavia.

== History ==
Srećni ljudi began airing on Radio Television of Belgrade on Sunday 12 September 1993, opening with the theme song named "Srećni ljudi" sung by Ekstra Nena and Boba Stefanović. It has 70 episodes, divided into 2 seasons, both having 35 episodes. The last episode aired on 30 June 1996.

The series was reran several times.

== Plot ==
The plot follows the members of Golubović family (father, mother, their son, his wife and their two children), in the time of sanctions and difficulty. Each member is confronted by their own daily struggles and everyone is looking for solutions.

== Cast ==
- Velimir Bata Živojinović - Aranđel Golubović (main character)
- Radmila Savićević - Ristana Golubović (Aranđel's wife)
- Živojin Milenković - Tijosav Marjanović "Garac" (father of Ristana's and Aranđel's daughter in-law)
- Desimir Stanojević - Vukašin Golubović (Ristana's and Aranđel` son)
- Tanja Bošković / Zlata Numanagić - Lola Golubović (Vukašin's wife)
- Dubravka Mijatović / Jugoslava Drašković - Đurđina "Đina" Golubović (Vukašin's and Lola's daughter)
- Svetislav Goncić - Časlav Marjanović "Čarli" (Lola's brother)
- Janko Milivojević - Nebojša "Neca" Golubović (Vukašin's and Lola's son)
- Nikola Simić - Mihajlo Ostojić (Golubović's neighbour)
- Danilo Lazović - Šćepan Šćekić
- Vlastimir Đuza Stojiljković - Marinko Bidžić / Conte Mario Marco del Tintoretto (Italian man)

== Change of actresses ==
After the 25th episode, Tanja Bošković and Dubravka Mijatović were replaced by Zlata Numanagić and Jugoslava Drašković, respectively. Both of the actresses left the series allegedly because of unpaid wages.

== See also ==
- Radio Television of Serbia
