= Branka Katić =

Serbian actress (born 1970)

- Бранка Катић
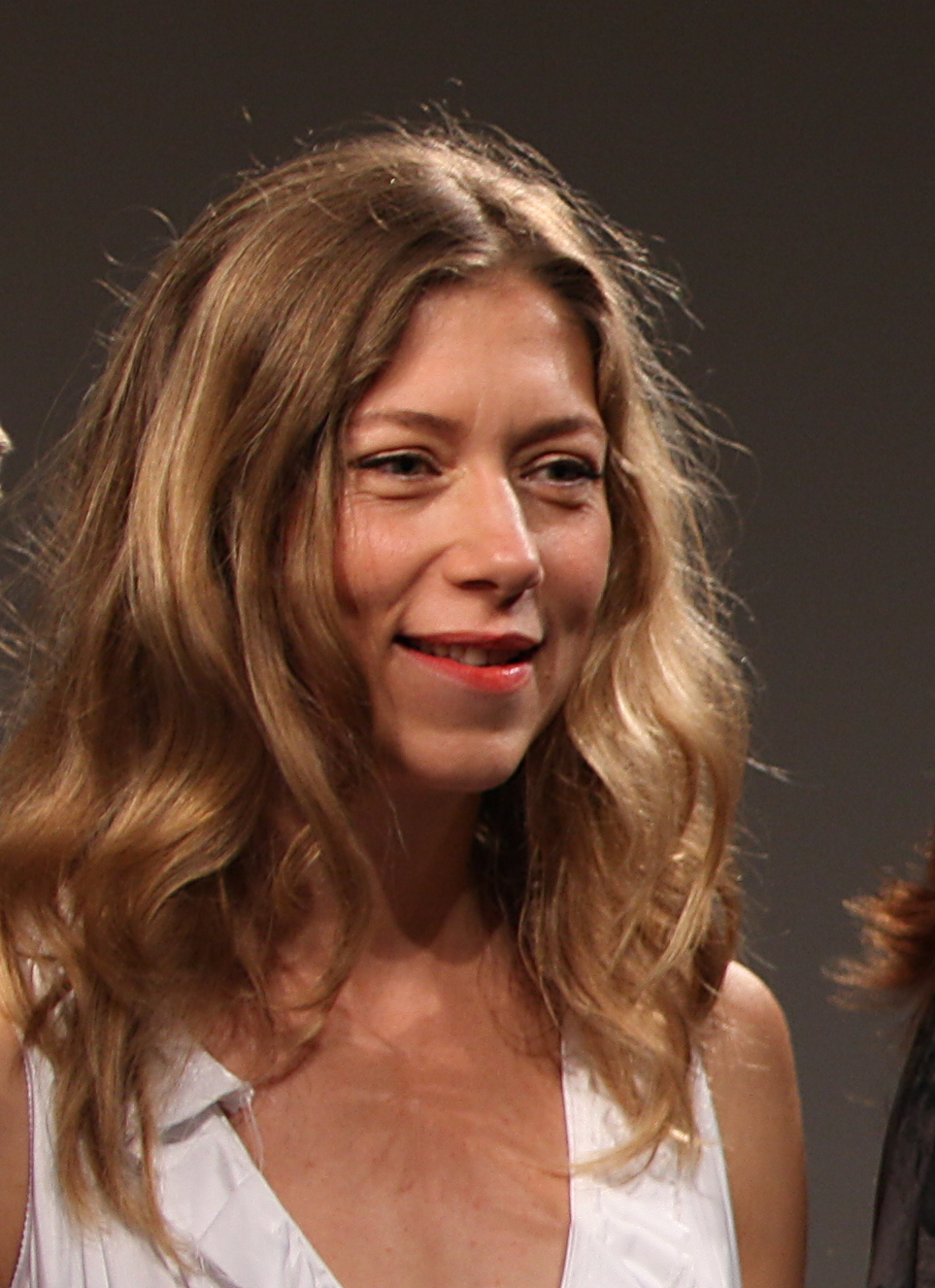
- Katić in 2010
- Born: 20 January 1970 (age 56); Belgrade, PR Serbia, Yugoslavia
- Occupation: Actress
- Years active: 1985–present
- Spouse: Julian Farino
- Children: 2

Branka Katić (Serbian Cyrillic: Бранка Катић; born 20 January 1970) is a Serbian actress known for appearing in the films Black Cat, White Cat and Public Enemies, and the TV series Big Love.

== Career ==
Katić debuted in the film Nije lako sa muškarcima when she was 14 years old. She was a student of the Academy of Dramatic Art, and received instruction from actor Rade Šerbedžija. She appeared in theatre in Subotica, Novi Sad and Belgrade.

Her film appearances include Black Cat, White Cat, In July and Public Enemies. Her television work includes playing Tatiana Taylor, the second wife of Barry Taylor, in Auf Wiedersehen, Pet; Ana on the HBO series Big Love; Charlotte Kaletta in the TV miniseries Anne Frank: The Whole Story; Nika Marx, the producer's wife in the episode "The Prince's Bride" of Entourage; and as a prostitute in an episode of The Vice.

== Personal life ==
Katić is married to British film and television director Julian Farino. They have two sons.

== Filmography ==
Film
Year	Title	Role	Notes
1985	Nije lako sa muškarcima	Tanja	
1992	Policajac sa Petlovog brda	Jasna Simić	
1992	We Are Not Angels	Buba	
1992	Crni bombarder	Daca	
1992	Bulevar revolucije	A friend of Biljana	
1994	Biće bolje		
1994	Slatko od snova	Đina	
1995	Tamna je noć	Sofija 'Cocke' Askerc	
1995	Premeditated Murder	Jelena Panić (Bulika)	
1996	Pretty Village, Pretty Flame	Nurse	
1998	The Wounds	Suzana	
1998	Black Cat, White Cat	Ida	
2000	In July	Luna	
2001	Sand	Marianne	Short film
2002	Jealousy		Short film
2002	Ten Minutes Older	Young Woman	Segment: "Addicted to the Stars"
2003	Strawberries in the Supermarket	Jagoda Dimitrijević	
2004	Falling in Paradise	Dušica Kundacina	
2004	Floating	Mitsy	Short film
2005	The Truth About Love	Katya	
2006	Breaking and Entering	Tanya	
2007	The Englishman	Svetla	
2009	Public Enemies	Anna Sage	
2010	The Woman with a Broken Nose	Biljana	
2010	L'Homme qui voulait vivre sa vie	Ivana	
2012	Falsifikator	Mirjana	
2014	Captain America: The Winter Soldier	Renata	
2021	The King's Man	Alexandra Feodorovna	
2025	How Come It's All Green Out Here?	Marjana	The film premiered at KVIFF on 7 July, competing for Proxima Grand Prix.
2025	Desire Lines (Linije želje)		It premiered in the main competition at the 78th Locarno Film Festival on 12 August.
2026	The Brink of War	Raisa Gorbacheva	

Television
Year	Title	Role	Notes
1987	Bolji život	A schoolfriend of Boba	9 episodes
1992	Devojka s lampom	Damjan's sister	TV film
1993	Niko nije savršen	Hortenzija	TV film
1993	Osmeh Margaret Jursenar	Grejs Frik	TV film
1993	Policajac sa Petlovog Brda	Jasna	6 episodes
1995	Otvorena vrata	Sandra tj. Cora	Episode: "Ja bih da se malo izblaziram do sutra" Episode: "Slava"
1998	Zla žena	Pela / Sultana	TV film
1998	Kod Lude ptice		TV series
1999	Warriors	Almira Zec	TV film
2000	The Vice	Sofia	Episode: "Betrayed: Part 1"; Episode: "Part 2"
2001	Anne Frank: The Whole Story	Charlotte 'Lotte' Kaletta	TV miniseries
2001	Armadillo	Irina	TV series
2002–2004	Auf Wiedersehen, Pet	Tatiana Taylor	7 episodes
2003	Clocking Off	Maya Lazarevic	Episode: "Maya's Story"
2003	Byron	Teresa Guiccioli	TV film
2004	Red Cap	Samira Hadjic	Episode: "Betrayed"
2004	The Last Detective	Natalie Berisha	Episode: "Dangerous and Lonely Hearts"
2004	Hustle	Olenka	Episode: "A Touch of Class"
2006	H. G. Wells: War with the World	Maura Budberg	TV film
2007	Entourage	Nika Marx	Episode: "The Prince's Bride"
2007	Mile vs. tranzicija	Maca	6 episodes
2007–2011	Big Love	Ana	14 episodes
2008	Trial & Retribution	Maryna Petrenko	Episode: "The Rules of the Game: Part 1"
2008	Waking the Dead	Jasni Vaspovic	Episode: "Pieta: Part 1"; Episode: "Pieta: Part 2"
2009	Bored to Death	The Lonely White Dove	Episode: "The Case of the Lonely White Dove"
2011	Chaos	Sophia Vukola	Episode: "Defending Sophia"
2011	The Jury II	Kristina Bamford	5 episodes
2012	The Fuse	Donna	TV series, post-production
2012	Blackout	Donna	BBC TV series
2013	Red Widow	Alexandra	TV series
2013	The Paradise	Clemence Romanis	Series 2, episodes 2 and 8
2015	You, Me and the Apocalypse	Antonia	Series 1, episode 5
2016–2020	Novine	Dijana Mitrović	
2019	Cleaning Up	Mina	
