= Stevan Šalajić =

- Стеван Шалајић
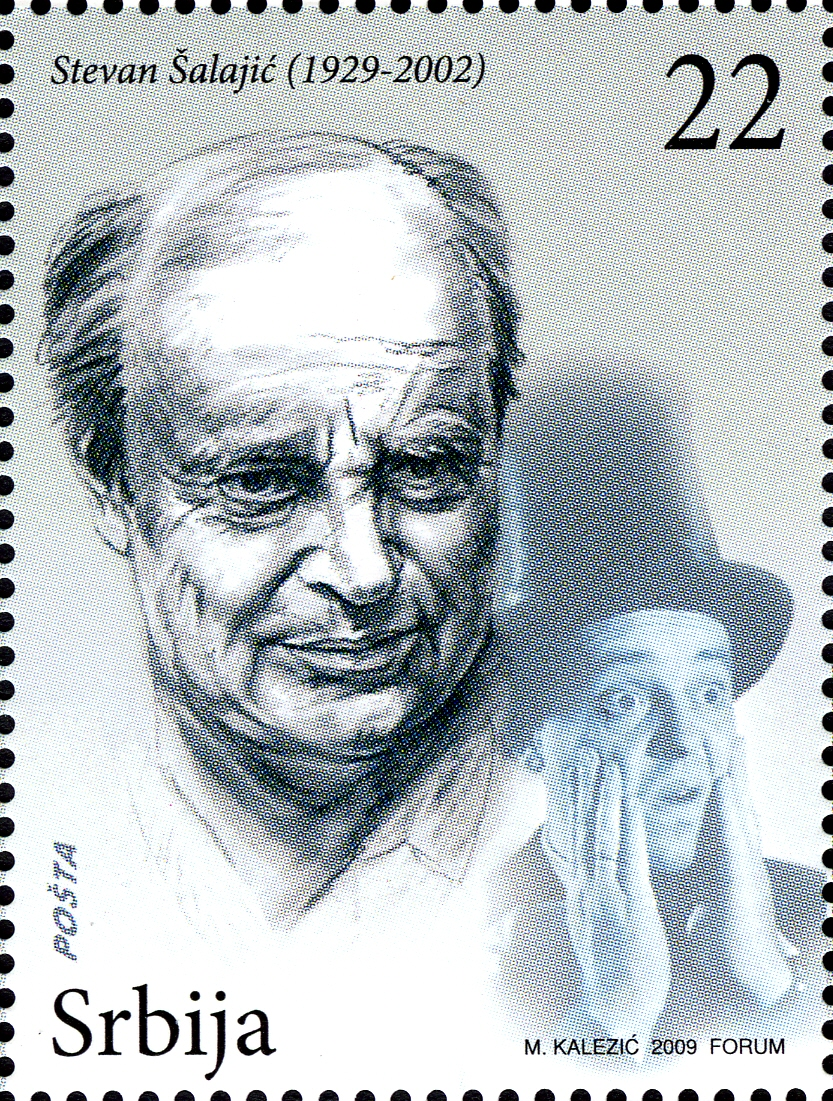
- Šalajić at 2009 Serbian post stamp
- Born: 23 June 1929; Borča, Belgrade, Kingdom of Yugoslavia
- Died: 1 July 2002 (aged 73); Novi Sad, Serbia and Montenegro
- Occupation: Actor

Stevan Šalajić (Serbian Cyrillic: Стеван Шалајић: 23 June 1929 – 1 July 2002) was a Serbian actor.

== Selected filmography ==
=== Film ===
Year	Title	Role	Notes
1959	Campo Mamula	Bane	
1961	Izbiračica	Tosica	
1981	Siroko je lisce	Gusa	
