= Marko Nikolić (actor) =

Serbian actor (1946–2019)

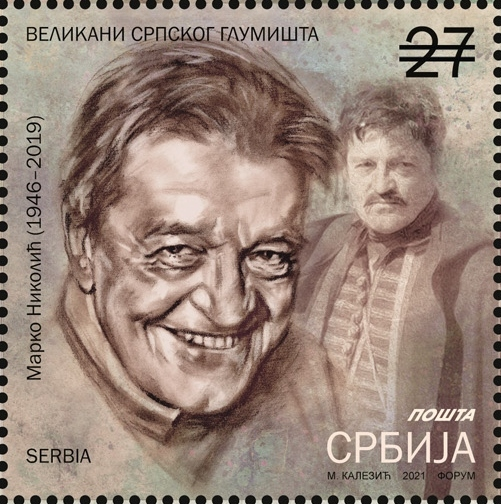
- Nikolić on a 2021 Serbia postage stamp.
- Born: 20 October 1946; Kraljevo, PR Serbia, FPR Yugoslavia
- Died: 2 January 2019 (aged 72); Belgrade, Serbia
- Other names: Giga; Mare
- Occupation: Actor
- Years active: 1967–2018

Marko Nikolić (20 October 1946 – 2 January 2019) was a Serbian actor. He appeared in more than one hundred films from 1967 to 2018.

== Filmography ==
Film
Year	Title	Role	Notes
1968	It Rains in My Village	Aziz	
1969	Sedmina		
1969	Zaseda	Seoski milicajac II	
1969	Early Works	Dragisa	
1972	Prvi splitski odred	Povjerenik glavnog ustaskog stana	
1974	The Republic of Užice	Klaker	
1975	Poznajete li Pavla Plesa?	Mrdjan	
1976	Devojacki most	Marko	
1977	A Shot	Petar Zoric	
1978	Dvoboj za Juznu prugu	Misa	
1978	Bosko Buha	Puskar	
1980	Petria's Wreath	Dobrivoje	
1980	Snovi, zivot, smrt Filipa Filipovica		
1981	Sesta brzina	Gastarbajter	
1981	Kraljevski voz	Zeleznicar ilegalac	
1983	Le prix du danger	Contestant	Uncredited
1983	Great Transport	Pavle Paroski	Voice, Uncredited
1989	Bolji zivot	Dragisa Popadic	
1990	Silent Gunpowder	Mrki	
1994	Dnevnik uvreda 1993	Stefan Nikolic	
1995	Terasa na krovu	Ratko	
1995	Tamna je noc	Bosko Belezada	
2002	Drzava mrtvih	Pijanac Rocko	
2002	The Cordon	Zmaj	
2006	Sejtanov ratnik	Karadjordje	
2010	Montevideo, God Bless You!	Atanas Bozic	
2011	The Parade	Bogdan	
2014	Jednaki		(segment "Sofija")
2014	Peti leptir	Deda Dusan	
2015	Za kralja i otadzbinu	Milisav Janjic – stari	
2015	Brat Deyan	Dejan Stanic	

Television
Year	Title	Role	Notes
1987–1988	Vuk Karadžić	Karadjordje Petrovic	8 episodes
1987–1991	Bolji život	Dragisa 'Giga' Popadic	82 episodes
1995	The End of Obrenović Dynasty	General Cincar Markovic	9 episodes
2017	Shadows over Balkan	Deda Luka	6 episodes
2018–2019	Pogrešan čovjek	Lazar Crnkovic sr.	131 episodes
