= The Beauty of Vice =

1986 film by Živko Nikolić

- Directed by: Živko Nikolić
- Starring: Mira Furlan; Mima Karadžić
- Music by: Zoran Simjanović
- Release date: 6 January 1986
- Running time: 105 minutes
- Country: SFR Yugoslavia
- Language: Serbo-Croatian

The Beauty of Vice (Serbian: Lepota poroka, Лепота порока) is a 1986 Yugoslav drama film directed by Živko Nikolić.

The film sold 866,474 tickets at the box office.

== Cast ==
- Mira Furlan - Jaglika
- Mima Karadžić - Luka
- Petar Božović - Žorž
- Alain Noury - foreign nudist
- Ines Kotman - foreign nudist
- Mira Banjac - Milada
