= Three Tickets to Hollywood =

1993 film

- Directed by: Božidar Nikolić
- Starring: Branislav Lečić; Bogdan Diklić
- Edited by: Branka Ceperac
- Release date: 9 April 1993
- Running time: 1h 58min
- Country: Yugoslavia
- Language: Serbian

Three Tickets to Hollywood (Serbian: Tri karte za Holivud) is a 1993 Serbian comedy film directed by Božidar Nikolić.

== Cast ==
- Branislav Lečić - Gavrilo
- Bogdan Diklić - Zivadin
- Ljubiša Samardžić - Limijer
- Neda Arnerić - Natalija
- Bata Živojinović - Mrgud
- Branislav Jerinić - Spasoje
- Vesna Stanojević - Ruza
- Dragan Nikolić - Aldo
- Slobodan Ćustić - Nikola
- Vesna Čipčić - Uciteljica
- Mima Karadžić - Globus
- Danilo Lazović - Brica
- Petar Banićević - Timosenko
- Dušan Janićijević - Postar
