= Josif Tatić =

Serbian actor

- Born: 13 April 1946; Novi Sad, FPR Yugoslavia
- Died: 8 February 2013 (aged 66); Belgrade, Serbia
- Occupation: Actor
- Years active: 1967–2011

Josif Tatić (13 April 1946 – 8 February 2013) was a Serbian film actor. He appeared in more than one hundred films from 1967 to 2011, such as Balkan Express (1983), Let's Fall in Love 2 (1989), Three Tickets to Hollywood (1993), Savior (1998), The Professional (2003), Wait for Me and I Will Not Come (2009).

== Selected filmography ==
Film
Year	Title	Role	Notes
2008	The Tour		
2007	Hadersfild		
2005	Made in YU		
2003	The Professional		
1999	The Dagger		
1984	The End of the War		
1977	Special Education		

TV
Year	Title	Role	Notes
1987-1991	Bolji život		
1987	Vuk Karadžić		
