= Tihomir Arsić =

Serbian actor (1957–2020)

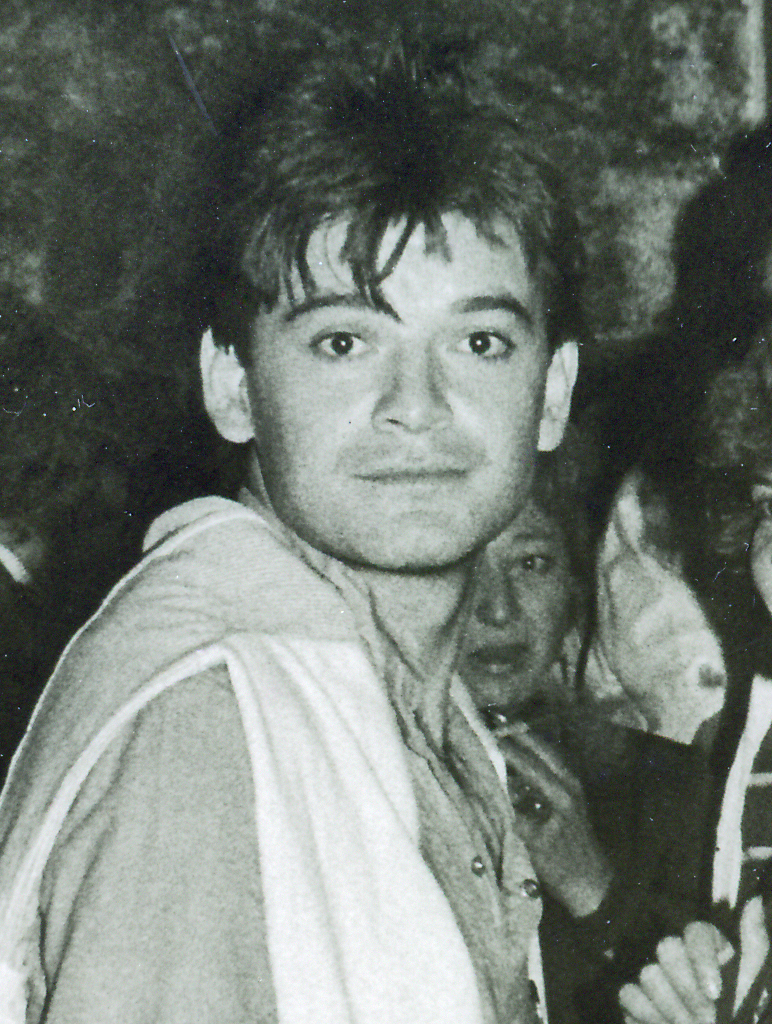
- Arsić in 1984
- Born: 21 July 1957; Zemun, PR Serbia, FPR Yugoslavia
- Died: 7 December 2020 (aged 63); Belgrade, Serbia
- Occupation: Actor
- Years active: 1975–2020

Tihomir Arsić (21 July 1957 – 7 December 2020) was a Serbian actor. He appeared in more than forty films since 1975.

== Selected filmography ==
Year	Title	Role	Notes
1981	The Promising Boy		
1983	Great Transport		
1989	Battle of Kosovo	Lazar Musić	
2006	The Optimists		
