= Glas javnosti =

Newspaper in Belgrade, Serbia

- Type: Daily newspaper
- Format: Berliner
- Owner: Radisav Rodić
- Founded: 20 April 1998; 28 years ago
- Ceased publication: 16 January 2010
- Political alignment: Center-right; Populism
- Headquarters: 27. marta 69/14, 11000 Belgrade, Serbia
- Website: www.glas-javnosti.rs

Glas javnosti (Глас јавности, meaning "Voice of the Public") was a daily newspaper published in Belgrade. After publishing a newspaper from April 1998 until January 2010, the people behind the project have since then run an online news portal and YouTube channel under the same name.

Its first issue appeared on 20 April 1998, published by a group of journalists from Blic daily who, led by Manojlo Vukotić, left to form their own newspaper.

Initially, their new paper carried the Novi Blic name, but the Belgrade Commercial Court put a stop to that by issuing an immediate injunction citing copyright infringement. After five issues, on 25 April 1998, the paper appeared under its current name, which the staff took from a long-forgotten 19th century publication.

Modern Glas javnosti assumes a continuity from a newspaper of the same name published in Kragujevac during the 19th century. The first issue of that Glas javnosti came out on 15 July 1874.

Glas is financially managed by Radisav Rodić who also owns Kurir. Initially, the paper's editor-in-chief duties were performed by Manojlo Vukotić, who was succeeded by Srećko Petrić, Milan Bečejić, Slavoljub Kačarević, Maja Vojinović, Petar Lazić, Ivan Čorbić, Slavica Jovović, and Ljiljana Staletović.

The FR Yugoslavian authorities frequently went after Glas. On 2 and 3 October 1999, the paper ceased publication due to an official injunction, citing three unregistered workers at the ABC grafika printing company. The ban was widely seen as retribution for the paper's decision to print and distribute a bulletin by the Alliance for Change opposition coalition.

In January 2010, the newspaper ceased publishing its print issue. The plan initially was to continue with the web-portal and eventually go back to print publishing but this did not occur.
