= Rogojevac, Kragujevac =

Coordinates: 44.0333°N 20.7667°E

Rogojevac Рогојевац (Serbian)
- Village
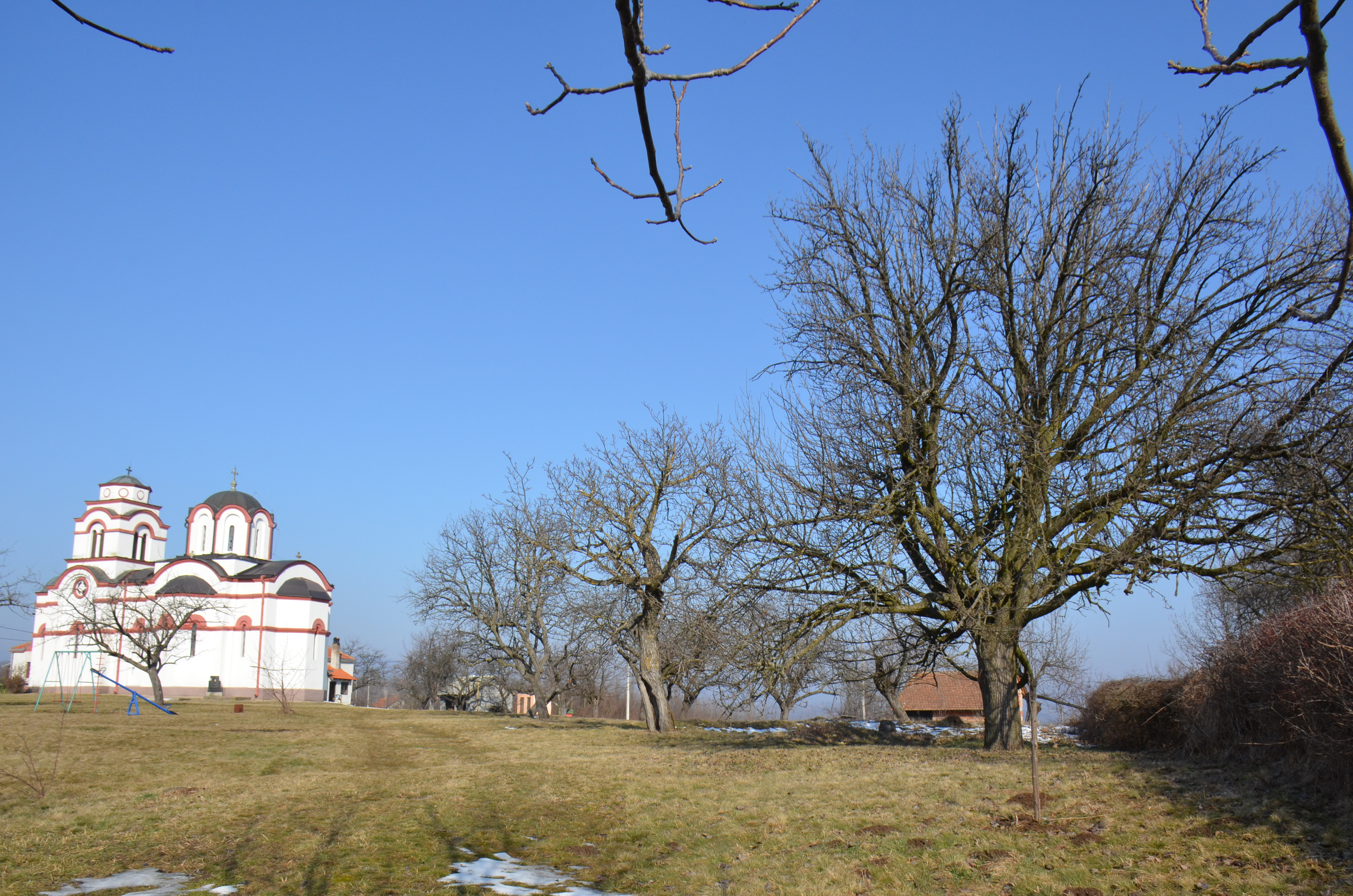
- Interactive map of Rogojevac
- Country: Serbia
- District: Šumadija District
- City: Kragujevac

Population (2011)
  - Total: 394
- Time zone: UTC+1 (CET)
  - Summer (DST): UTC+2 (CEST)

Rogojevac (Serbian Cyrillic: Рогојевац) is a village in the Kragujevac city area in the Šumadija District, Serbia. According to the 2011 census there were 394 inhabitants. Bronze Age graves of nomads from the steppes of Russia were found in the village vicinity.
