= Danilo Lazović =

Serbian actor (1951–2006)

- Данило Лазовић
- Born: 25 November 1951; Brodarevo, PR Serbia, FPR Yugoslavia
- Died: 25 March 2006 (aged 54); Belgrade, Serbia and Montenegro
- Occupation: Actor

Danilo Lazović (Serbian Cyrillic: Данило Лазовић; 25 November 1951 – 25 March 2006) was a Serbian actor. He is best remembered by his role of Šćepan Šćekić in the Yugoslav TV series Srećni ljudi.

== Political views ==
During the Yugoslav wars, he strongly supported both Slobodan Milošević and his friend and politician Radovan Karadžić and was also a member of an organisation with the goal to show the world the truth about Karadžić. He saw Karadžić as the rightful president of Republika Srpska, which in his thoughts is and must be Serbian.

== Death ==
On 25 March 2006, he died of a heart attack in Belgrade, at the age of 54.

== Filmography ==
- Jagoda u supermarketu
- Virtualna stvarnost
- Tajna porodičnog blaga
- Three Tickets to Hollywood
- Mala
- Poslednji krug u Monci
- Timočka buna
- Igmanski marš
- Laf u srcu
- Sveto Mesto
- Srećni Ljudi
- Slom
- The End of the Obrenović Dynasty
