= Predrag Ejdus =

Serbian actor (1947–2018)

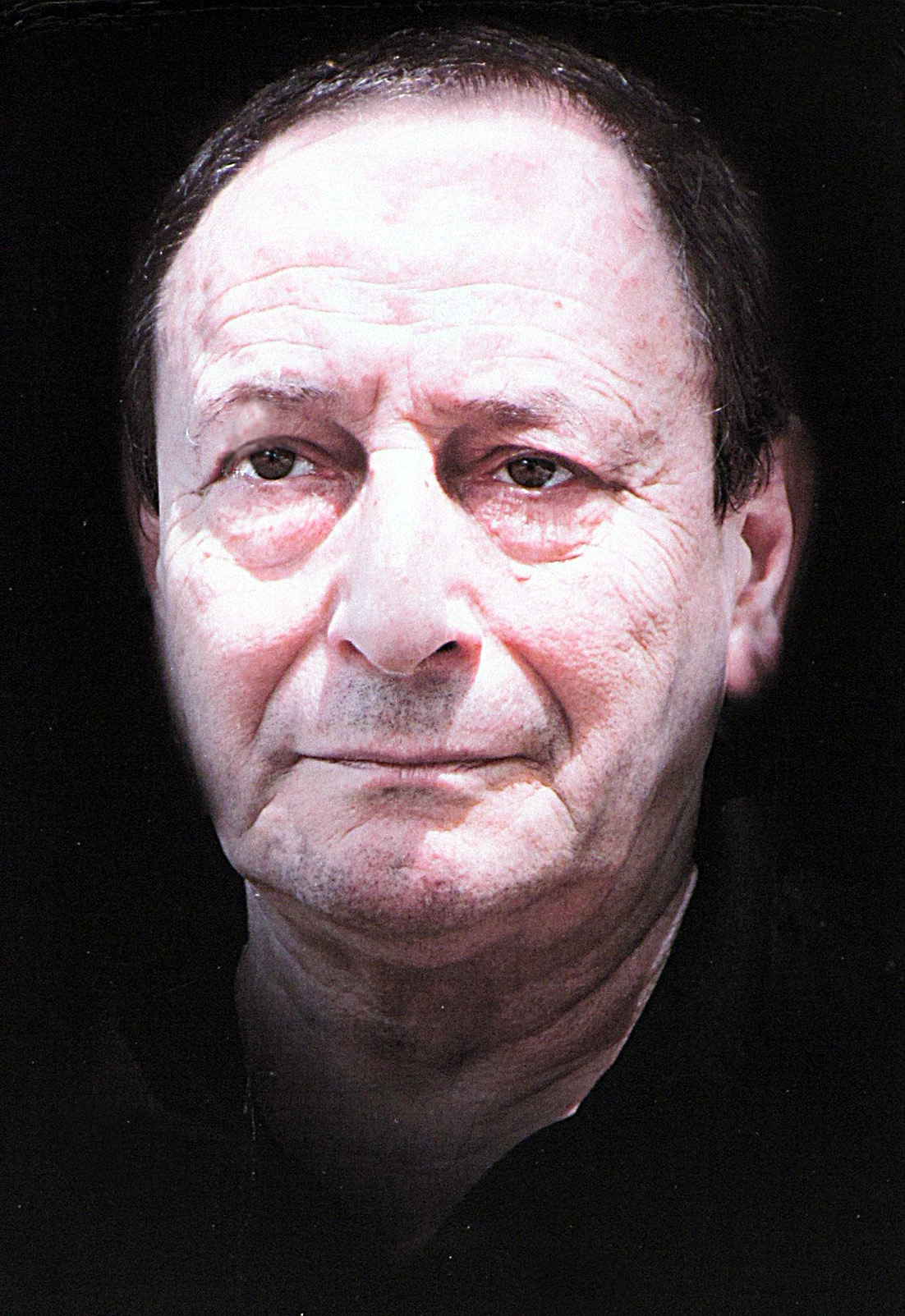
- Predrag Ejdus on a poster
- Born: 24 July 1947; Belgrade, PR Serbia, FPR Yugoslavia
- Died: 28 September 2018 (aged 71); Belgrade, Serbia
- Education: Faculty of Dramatic Arts
- Alma mater: University of Arts in Belgrade

Predrag Ejdus (Serbian Cyrillic: Предраг Ејдус; 24 July 1947 – 28 September 2018) was a Serbian actor of theater, film and television. His extensive body of work includes over 200 theater productions, 50 films and 30 television series.

Ejdus received numerous acting awards including the Statuette of Joakim Vujić in 2004 and Dobričin prsten in 2008.

== Life ==
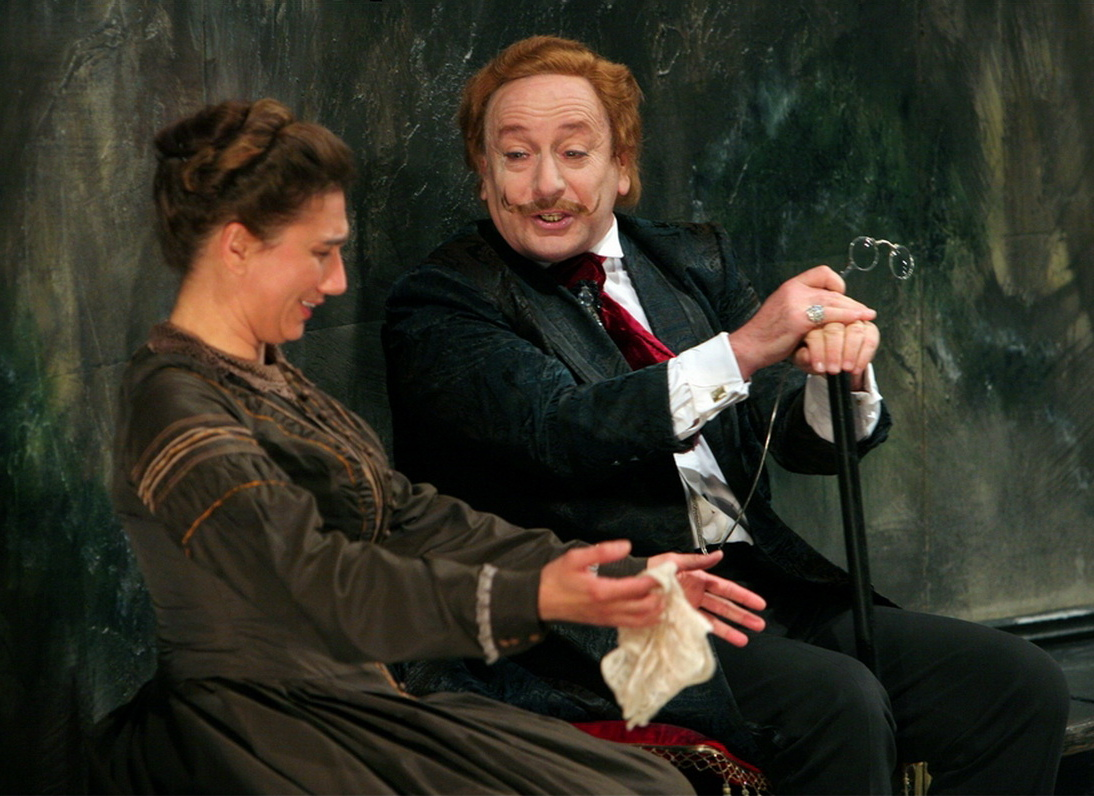
Ejdus in Uncle's Dream by Dostoevsky

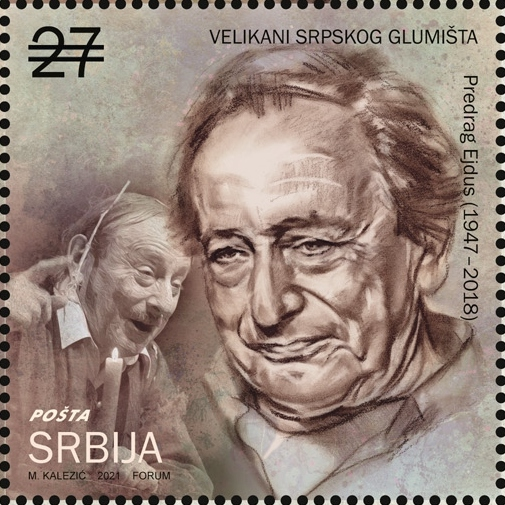
Ejdus on a 2021 stamp of Serbia

Ejdus was born on 24 July 1947 in Belgrade, Yugoslavia (now Serbia) to a Jewish father and a Serb mother. He later married and had a daughter and a son. He graduated from the Fourteenth Belgrade Gymnasium and from the Belgrade Academy of Theater, Film, Radio and Television in 1972.

Between 1985 and 1989, Ejdus was president of the Society of Theater Artists of Serbia, and in 1993 he joined the ensemble of the Yugoslav Drama Theatre. He died on 28 September 2018 in Belgrade.
