= Dubravka Mijatović =

Serbian actress

- Дубравка Мијатовић
- Born: 27 December 1968 (age 57); Belgrade, SFR Yugoslavia
- Education: Faculty of Dramatic Arts
- Alma mater: University of Arts in Belgrade
- Occupation: Actress
- Years active: 1985–present

Dubravka Mijatović (Serbian Cyrillic: Дубравка Мијатовић; born 27 December 1968) is a Serbian actress.

== Film and television career ==
Dubravka was only nine years old when she got her first TV role in children's program "Vaga Za Tačno Merenje" along with famed actors Renata Ulmanski, Mija Aleksić. In 1985, Dubravka's film debut was in the film "Nije Lako Sa Muškarcima," she starred with prominent Serbian actors Milena Dravić, Ljubiša Samardžić, Milivoje Mića Tomić. She graduated from the Faculty Of Dramatic Arts at the University of Belgrade in 1994.

In 1998, she starred in romantic comedy "Tri Palme Za Tri Bitange; "Rat Uživo" (2000); "Jagoda U Supermarketu" (2003). In 1988, Dubravka starred in popular television series "Bolji Život." In 1993, she got a major role in TV series "Happy People," but after a second season she arbitrarily left the show. She was blacklisted by the state television RTS because of that scandal. In 2003, she returned on RTS and starred in numerous TV series: "Kazneni Prostor" (2003); "Stižu Dolari" (2004).

Recently, she is famous for playing Dragorad's wife in Moj rodjak sa sela RTS TV series and a godmother in Bela ladja RTS TV series.

== Personal life ==
Dubravka has two daughters; Iva Radaković with her former husband Goran Radaković and Sara Madžgalj with former partner Marinko Madžgalj.
