= Petar Božović =

Serbian actor

- Петар Божовић
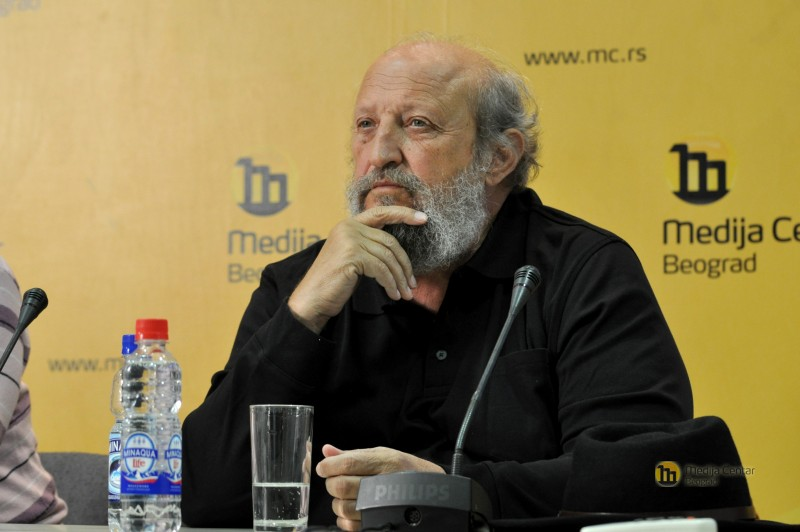
- Božović in May 2014
- Born: 22 May 1946 (age 79); Zemun, PR Serbia, FPR Yugoslavia
- Other names: Pera
- Occupation: Actor
- Years active: 1968–present
- Height: 1.84 m (6 ft 0 in)
- Children: Draško

Petar Božović (Serbian: Петар Божовић; born 22 May 1946) is a Serbian actor.

== Selected filmography ==
=== Film ===
Year	Title	Role	Notes
1980	The Secret of Nikola Tesla	Nikola Tesla	
1984	Unseen Wonder	Zeljo	
1986	The Beauty of Vice	Žorž	
1987	Reflections (1987 film)	Stole	Golden Arena Award for Best Supporting Actor
1992	The Black Bomber	Besevic	
1997	Three Summer Days	Erke	
1999	The Dagger	Sabahudin Aga / Atifaga Tanović	
2009	Wait for Me and I Will Not Come	Milenko	
