= When I Am Dead and Gone =

- Serbo-Croatian: Kad budem mrtav i beo
- Directed by: Živojin Pavlović
- Written by: Ljubiša Kozomara; Gordan Mihić
- Starring: Dragan Nikolić; Ružica Sokić; Neda Spasojević; Dara Čalenić; Severin Bijelić
- Cinematography: Milorad Jakšić Fanđo
- Edited by: Olga Skrigin
- Production company: Filmska Radna Zajednica
- Release date: 27 December 1967
- Running time: 79 minutes
- Country: Yugoslavia
- Language: Serbo-Croatian

When I Am Dead and Gone (Serbo-Croatian: Kad budem mrtav i beo, Serbian Cyrillic: Кад будем мртав и бео) is a 1967 Yugoslav film directed by Živojin Pavlović and written by Ljubiša Kozomara and Gordan Mihić. It stars famous Serbian actors Dragan Nikolić and Ružica Sokić.

When I Am Dead and Gone is considered by critics to be one of the greatest achievements of the Yugoslav Black Wave. The Yugoslav Film Archive officially listed it as the second-best Yugoslav film of all time.

== Plot ==
Janko Bugarski, also known as Jimmy Barka, has to leave his temporary job as a seasonal worker together with his girlfriend Ljilja. Without a job, he sets out with Ljilja into uncertainty. His mother, a poor washerwoman, cannot help him, and there are no jobs available in factories or companies. In order to make some money, Jimmy steals from workers at a construction site, and while fleeing from pursuers, he loses Ljilja. That's when the odyssey of Jimmy Barka begins. He meets a bar singer, Duška, becomes her lover, and learns to sing. Although he sings poorly, that doesn't stop him from traveling through small towns, singing at fairs, and in remote military garrisons. In one small town, he meets a young dental technician named Bojana, and with her, he goes to Belgrade to compete in a young singers' competition. Instead of applause and affirmation, he is met with boos and insults. Jimmy runs away on his own, and on a ship, he once again encounters Ljilja, who makes a living by pickpocketing and feigning pregnancy. Both of them go to see the former construction site manager, Milutin, in an attempt to blackmail him: the young woman supposedly carries his child. Milutin discovers that he has been deceived. He tries to assault Ljilja, but Jimmy stops him. He attempts to kill Jimmy and mocks him in front of the workers. Humiliated and enraged, he takes his rifle and kills Jimmy.

== Cast ==
- Dragan Nikolić as Jimmy Barka
- Slobodan Aligrudić as Milutin
- Miodrag Andrić as Ibro
- Severin Bijelić as officer
- Dara Čalenić as Mica
- Aleksandar Gavrić as Dule
- Milan Jelić as Jimmy's roommate
- Ljiljana Jovanović as Jimmy's mother
- Petar Lupa as chauffeur
- Vojislav Mićović as worker
- Branislav Ciga Milenković as violinist
- Žika Milenković as Stole (waiter)
- Predrag Milinković as railroad worker
- Ružica Sokić as Duška
- Milorad Spasojević as journalist
- Neda Spasojević as Lilica
- Zorica Šumadinac as Bojana
- Milivoje Tomić as supervisor
- Vladan Živković as "Kidney"
- Ljubomir Ćipranić
- Olga Jančevecka
- Nikola Milić
- Svetolik Nikačević
- Đorđe Pura
- Snežana Lukić
- Alenka Rančić
- Borivoje Bora Stojanović
- Janez Vrhovec

== Awards ==
- Pula - Golden Arena for Best Film, Golden Arena for Best Director (Živojin Pavlović), Special Award for Best Actor (Dragan Nikolić), Best Film of the Year
- Niš - Special Award for Best Actor - Dragan Nikolić, Special Award for Best Actress - Ružica Sokić, Golden Medal of Politika Express

== Legacy ==
The Yugoslav Film Archive, in accordance with its authorities based on the Law on Cultural Heritage, declared one hundred Serbian feature films (1911–1999) as cultural heritage of great importance on December 28, 2016. When I Am Dead and Gone is also on that list.

== Trivia ==
- According to some sources, director John Schlesinger listed When I Am Dead and Gone among the films that inspired Midnight Cowboy.
- The role of Jimmy Barka was originally intended for Boris Dvornik. However, as Dvornik was in the military at the time, the role was assigned to Dragan Nikolić, and it brought him fame.
- In 2018, the Yugoslav Film Archive, in collaboration with the company Vip Mobile and Center Film, restored and digitally remastered the film. The restored version was presented at the Berlin Film Festival as part of the prestigious official Forum program, and a special screening for the Serbian audience was held on February 21 in the ceremonial hall of the Yugoslav Film Archive.
