= The Dog Who Loved Trains =

- Directed by: Goran Paskaljević
- Written by: Gordan Mihić
- Starring: Svetlana Bojković; Irfan Mensur; Bata Živojinović; Pavle Vuisić; Danilo Stojković; Ljiljana Jovanović
- Cinematography: Aleksandar Petković
- Edited by: Olga Skrigin
- Music by: Zoran Hristić
- Release date: 1977
- Running time: 91 minutes
- Country: Yugoslavia
- Language: Serbo-Croatian

The Dog Who Loved Trains (Serbo-Croatian: Pas koji je voleo vozove, Serbian Cyrillic: Пас који је волео возове), is a 1977 Yugoslav film directed by Goran Paskaljević.

The film was nominated for the Golden Bear award at the 28th Berlin International Film Festival in 1978.

The plot revolves around three completely different people - a girl who escapes from prison, a former movie stuntman who imitates Western scenes in the province, and a young man who believes in friendship and love. They meet and part ways in search of their own imagined worlds.

== Plot ==
A girl, Mika, is in prison for minor smuggling, which shatters her dreams of going to Paris. However, during the transportation of prisoners for forced labor, she manages to escape, which encourages her once again to pursue the trip. Without money and an identity, she is forced to accept the help of a former movie stuntman who travels through the provinces in cowboy attire with a horse and donkey, performing scenes from Western movies. On their journey, they meet an unemployed young man with no family who aimlessly roams, searching for his long-lost dog. The young man becomes attached to Mika, and together they flee from the stuntman and go to Belgrade, where he helps her obtain a fake passport so she can finally see Paris.

== Cast ==
- Svetlana Bojković as Mika
- Irfan Mensur as Mladić (Young Man)
- Bata Živojinović as Rodoljub "Rodney" Aleksić
- Pavle Vuisić as Uncle
- Danilo Stojković as Father
- Ljiljana Jovanović as Mother
- Dušan Janićijević as Žuti (Yellow)
- Dragomir Čumić as Mechanic
- Katica Želi as Female Convict
- Miroslava Bobić as Female Guard
- Gordana Pavlov as Sister
- Janez Vrhovec as Railwayman
- Boro Begović as Guard
- Ljubomir Ćipranić as Piljar
- Ratko Miletić as Mechanic's colleague
- Melita Bihali as Convict on the train
- Zoran Miljković as Miner
- Gordana Kosanović as Mother with a baby
- Vladan Živković
- Miroslub Lešo
- Ilonka Dognar
- Andrija Radić
- Božidar Stanković
- Ljubomir Veljković

== Awards ==
- Actress Svetlana Bojković received the Golden Arena for Best Actress at the Pula Film Festival in 1978 for her role of Mika in the film.

== Legacy ==
The Yugoslav Film Archive, in accordance with its authorities under the Law on Cultural Heritage, declared one hundred Serbian feature films (1911-1999) as cultural heritage of great importance on December 28, 2016. The Dog Who Loved Trains is also included in this list.
