= Tomanija Đuričko =

Serbian actress (1914–1994)

- Томанија Ђуричко
- Born: Tomanija Popović; 16 February 1914; Šabac, Kingdom of Serbia
- Died: 31 January 1994 (aged 79); Belgrade, Serbia, FR Yugoslavia
- Occupation: Actress
- Relatives: Nikola Đuričko (grandson)

Tomanija Đuričko (née Popović, Serbian Cyrillic: Томанија Ђуричко; 16 February 1914 – 31 January 1994) was a Serbian actress. Aside from playing in troupes and theatres across Yugoslavia, she also starred in a large number of films and TV shows. Her grandson is Serbian actor Nikola Đuričko.

== Early life ==
Tomanija Đuričko was born on 16 February 1914 in Šabac as Tomanija Popović. Her father was called Jakov, and her mother Angelina; she was their fourth child. Between 1918 and 1922, the family lived in Menton in France as refugees. Following this, she lived in Bitolj and Skopje, but after her mother died and her father remarried, she moved back to Serbia. In Čačak, she took two years of grammar school, but due to financial issues, she completed her education at a hairdresser's school instead. She married in Čačak and changed her last name to Jeremić, however by the age of 17 she was already widowed.

== Career ==
Starting in 1927, Đuričko was a member of various amateur troupes, before joining her first professional troupe with actor and director Dobrica Radenković, where she would stay from 1934 to 1937. After a series of engagements with other troupes, she joined the Danube National Theatre in Pančevo, which would later become the Serbian National Theatre. She played there between 1941 and 1951, when she moved to Belgrade and joined the Belgrade Drama Theatre. She returned to Pančevo in 1954 or 1955, but ultimately left in 1956 when the theatre there shut down. In October of that year, she went to Bulgaria on a tour with the Belgrade Drama Theatre, playing in Arthur Miller's Death of a Salesman as the character of Linda Loman alongside Sima Janićijević as Willy Loman. She played in Šabac between 1957 and 1959, when she moved to Tuzla. In 1963, she became a member of the National Theatre in Belgrade, where she played until her eventual retirement from theatre in October 1977. After a short illness, she died in Belgrade on 31 January 1994.

Throughout her career, Đuričko played a very diverse set of roles in theatre, though in her later years she played mostly roles of mothers. Some of the plays she starred in include Branislav Nušić's Ožalošćena porodica, Jovan Sterija Popović's Pokondirena tikva, Anton Chekhov's Uncle Vanya, Henry de Montherlant's Port-Royal, and Friedrich Schiller's Intrigue and Love. She also starred in roles in films and TV shows, including Subotom uveče (1957), Operacija Ticijan (1963), Face to Face (1963), The Rats Woke Up (1967), which won the Silver Bear for Best Director at the 17th Berlin International Film Festival, Ljubav na seoski način (1970), Čedomir Ilić (1971), Hronika palanačkog groblja (1971), Kamiondžije (1972), Vruć vetar (1979), and Svedoci optužbe.

In 1950, the National Assembly of Vojvodina gave her an award for her role as Gurmyzhskaya in Alexander Ostrovsky's The Forest. Additionally, her role in Njih dvojica won her an award in Japan in 1956, and the Republic of Bosnia and Herzegovina gave her an award in 1961 for her role in Tennessee Williams' Orpheus Descending during her work in Tuzla. In 1966, she also won a medal at a film festival in Rome for her role in The Man in the Photograph (1963).

== Family ==
Through her work in the Danube National Theatre, she visited Kovin, where she met her husband, Đorđe Đuričko. They married in 1943, and Đorđe moved to Pančevo with her. He eventually died in 1989. Together, they had two children, a son by the name of Nikola in 1944, and a daughter named Marija in 1946. Nikola's son is Serbian actor Nikola Đuričko — he has stated that it is possible that his grandmother is the reason he is an actor.
