= Perfidy (disambiguation) =

Perfidy is a criminal, deceptive tactic in war.

Perfidy may also refer to:

- Perfidy (film) (1953), a Yugoslavian drama film directed by Vladimir Pogacic
- Perfidy (book) (1961), about the Rudolf Kastner trial, by Ben Hecht

== See also ==
- Perfidious Albion, a pejorative phrase for the UK, Great Britain, or England
