= Milivoje Tomić =

Serbian actor

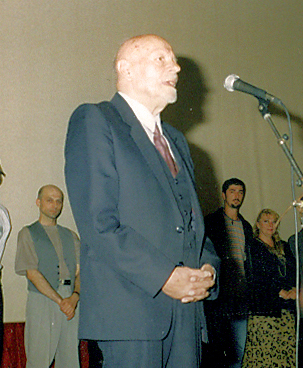
- Tomić in 1997
- Born: 10 February 1920; Belgrade, Kingdom of Serbs, Croats and Slovenes
- Died: 23 August 2000 (aged 80); Belgrade, FR Yugoslavia
- Occupation: Actor
- Years active: 1954–1998

Milivoje "Mića" Tomić (10 February 1920 – 23 August 2000) was a Serbian actor.

Tomić won numerous awards during his career, including the "Pavle Vuisic" Lifetime Achievement Award in 1997.

== Selected filmography ==
Year	Title	Role	Notes
1992	Tito and Me		
1987	The Harms Case		
1984	Balkan Spy	Doctor	
1984	The End of the War	Old Man	
1982	The Marathon Family	Maksimilijan Topalović	
1980	Petria's Wreath		
1980	Who's Singin' Over There?	Aleksa Simić	
1979	Nacionalna Klasa		
1978	The Tiger		
1977	Special Education		
1976	Beach Guard in Winter		
1967	I Even Met Happy Gypsies	Romanian	
1967	The Rats Woke Up	Milorad	
