= Legends of Anika =

- Directed by: Vladimir Pogačić
- Written by: Vladimir Pogačić; Vicko Raspor; Ivo Andrić (Novel)
- Starring: Milena Dapčević; Bratislav Grbić; Ljubinka Bobić; Mirko Milisavljević; Bosiljka Boci; Severin Bijelić; Mata Milošević; Viktor Starčić
- Cinematography: Aleksandar Sekulović
- Edited by: Milada Rajšić
- Music by: Krešimir Baranović
- Production company: Avala Film
- Release date: 18 April 1956 (United States)
- Running time: 87 minutes
- Country: Yugoslavia
- Language: Serbo-Croatian

Legends of Anika (Serbo-Croatian: Anikina vremena), is a 1954 Yugoslav drama film directed by Vladimir Pogačić.

The film is based on the same-titled short novel penned by the Nobel Prize-winning Yugoslav author Ivo Andrić, continuing Pogačić's series of screen adaptations of literary works by local authors (it was preceded by his critically acclaimed 1953 film Perfidy, which was itself based on a play by Ivo Vojnović).

It was the first Yugoslav film which had a cinema release in the United States, where it premiered on 18 April 1956.
