= Minja Vojvodić =

- Born: 31 August 1942; Kolašin, Italian governorate of Montenegro
- Died: 17 June 2014 (aged 71); Belgrade, Serbia
- Occupation: Actor
- Years active: 1965-2009

Minja Vojvodic (31 August 1942 – 17 June 2014) was a Montenegrin actor. He appeared in more than ninety films from 1965 to 2009.

== Filmography ==
Year	Title	Role	Notes
1965	Treasure of the Aztecs		Uncredited
1966	Sticenik	Siledzija III	Uncredited
1967	The Rats Woke Up	Postar	
1968	Brat doktora Homera		Uncredited
1968	Comandamenti per un gangster	Driver	Uncredited
1968	Pre istine	Huligan	Uncredited
1969	The Bridge		
1970	Zarki		
1972	Tecumseh	Black Eagle	
1972	Pukovnikovica	Seoski krcmar	
1974	SB zatvara krug		
1974	Death and the Dervish	Strazar (II)	
1975	Decak i violina		
1978	Ljubav i bijes		
1978	Inn of the Sinful Daughters		
1978	The Tiger		
1981	Sok od sljiva	Delatnik motela	
1981	Lov u mutnom		
1981	The Promising Boy	Student	
1982	Savamala		
1982	Variola Vera	Milicioner na aerodromu 1	
1983	Jos ovaj put		
1983	Timocka buna	Petko ... kocijas	
1983	Kako sam sistematski unisten od idiota	Kamiondzija I	
1983	Mahovina na asfaltu	Anicin otac	
1984	Moljac		
1985	Cao inspektore	Covek sa biciklom	
1985	Sest dana juna	Milicionar 2	
1985	Zikina dinastija		
1986	Sekula i njegove zene		
1986	Razvod na odredjeno vreme		
1987	The Felons	Loncar	
1988	Tajna manastirske rakije	Milicioner (I)	
1988	Zaboravljeni	Stari svat	
1988	Spijun na stiklama		
1988	Suncokreti		
1989	Bunker Palace Hôtel		
1990	Cubok		
1991	The Serbian Girl		
1991	Noc u kuci moje majke	Radnik (II)	
1991	Svemirci su krivi za sve		
1992	Dezerter	Streljani vojnik	
1992	Crni bombarder	Policajac III	
1992	Bulevar revolucije		
1992	Jevreji dolaze	Floresku	
1992	Dama koja ubija	Siledzija II	Uncredited
1993	Three Tickets to Hollywood	Slovo 'D'	
1993	Obracun u kazino kabareu		
1994	Dnevnik uvreda 1993		
1994	Vukovar, jedna priča	Pljackas II	
1996	Dovidjenja u Cikagu	Obijac	
1997	Balkanska pravila	Lozac	
1997	Vracanje		
1998	Kupi mi Eliota	Kuvar	
2002	Drzava mrtvih	Vozac autobusa	
2003	Siroti mali hrcki 2010	Agent iz zgrade	
