= Heaven Without Love =

- Serbo-Croatian: Pukotina raja
- Directed by: Vladimir Pogačić
- Written by: Vladimir Pogačić; Milan Tutorov
- Based on: Pukotina raja by Milan Tutorov
- Starring: Ljubica Jović; Milan Puzić; Severin Bijelić; Tatjana Beljakova; Antun Vrdoljak
- Cinematography: Milorad Marković; Slobodan Marković
- Edited by: Ljerka Šurina-Stanojević
- Music by: Bojan Adamič
- Production company: Jadran Film
- Release date: 22 July 1959
- Running time: 102 minutes
- Country: Yugoslavia
- Language: Serbo-Croatian

Heaven Without Love (Serbo-Croatian: Pukotina raja / Пукотина раја, lit. 'A Crack in Heaven') is a Yugoslav drama film directed by Vladimir Pogačić, adapted from a play by Milan Tutorov. It was released in 1959. The film was poorly received.

== Plot ==
In Belgrade, Marija, a pharmacy student (Ljubica Jović) marries a medicine student, Slobodan Marković (Milan Puzić), in order to solve her existential issues. They grow older and their relationship changes. Slobodan abuses and ignores her, convinces her to have an abortion as she gets pregnant, and cheats on her with a nurse, so she starts a tragic love affair with Pavle Borovac (Antun Vrdoljak), a young journalist whom she meets at a beach.

== Cast ==
- Ljubica Jović as Marija Marković
- Milan Puzić as Slobodan Marković
- Tatjana Beljakova as Branka
- Severin Bijelić as Inspector Naumović
- Antun Vrdoljak as Pavle Borovac
- Branko Tatić as Obrad Kratić
- Zoran Longinović as Police Department Chief

== Reception ==
The film was poorly received upon its release and was criticised for its perceived advocacy of Jean-Paul Sartre's philosophy. Utilising psychological realism, the film was part of a trend of decreasing emphasis on ideology and regime compliance in Communist cinema towards the late 1950s. Tomislav Šakić of Kino Tuškanac likens the film to Orson Welles' Citizen Kane in its form as it tells the story from the point of view of a police investigation, and considers it an early feminist film for its portrayal of abortion.
