= Battle of Kosovo (film) =

1989 Yugoslav film

Бој на Косову Boj na Kosovu Battle of Kosovo
- Directed by: Zdravko Šotra
- Written by: Ljubomir Simović
- Produced by: Slobodan Jocić
- Starring: Miloš Žutić, Gorica Popović, Vojislav Brajović, Žarko Laušević, Ljuba Tadić
- Distributed by: Centar film
- Release date: 21 June 1989
- Running time: 117 minutes
- Country: Yugoslavia
- Language: Serbian

Battle of Kosovo (Serbo-Croatian: Бој на Косову, Boj na Kosovu) is a 1989 Yugoslav historical drama/war film filmed in Serbia. The film was based on the drama written by poet Ljubomir Simović. It depicts the historical Battle of Kosovo between Medieval Serbia and the Ottoman Empire which took place on 15 June 1389 (according to the Julian calendar, 28 June 1389 by the Gregorian calendar) in a field about 5 kilometers northwest of Pristina.

The film was released in 1989, which marked the 600th anniversary of the Battle. However, according to Serbian historian Olivera Milosavljevic, the film "said more about the political context of the 1980s than about...1389". Other academics have backed this sentiment, criticizing the film's historical accuracy and pointing to the film's support of Serbian nationalism.

== Synopsis ==
Serbian Duke Lazar in 1389 refuses to obey the Turk Sultan Murat who intends on invading Serbia with an army in order to conquer Europe. Although aware that he is weaker, without enough men, Duke Lazar decides to fight him anyway. The Serbian Lords are not united. Most of them want to fight, even at the cost of defeat, but some of them do not. Everyone fit for battle is sent to Kosovo. The battle of Kosovo in 1389 ended with no winners - with both armies defeated and both Lazar and Murat dead. The Turks would proceed to invade Serbia but were hindered from taking over the rest of Europe.

== Cast ==
- Miloš Žutić as Prince Lazar Hrebeljanović
- Gorica Popović as Princess Milica
- Vojislav Brajović as Vuk Branković
- Žarko Laušević as Miloš Obilić
- Ljuba Tadić as Sultan Murad
- Branislav Lečić as Bayezid
- Katarina Gojković as the Kosovo Maiden
- Neda Arnerić as the Fishwife
- Tihomir Lazić as Lazar Musić
- Marko Baćović as Yakub Bey
- Branko Cvejić as Tamnavac
- Bogdan Diklić as Levčanian
- Svetozar Cvetković as Milan Toplica
- Milena Dravić as Velisava
- Milan Gutović as Ivan Kosančić
- Dušan Janjićijević as Miralem
- Rastislav Jović as Milutin the Servant
- Ivan Bekjarev as Paramunac
- Milutin Karadžić as The guard
- Petar Kralj as Vojiša
- Predrag Laković as Teofan
- Toni Laurenčić as Stefan Musić
- Irfan Mensur as Makarije
- Radoslav Milenković as Bogoje/Mustafa
- Predrag Milinković as The salooner
- Miodrag Radovanović as Spiridon
- Nemanja Stanišić as Stefan Lazarević
- Tanasije Uzunović as Gerasim
- Bata Živojinović as Hamza the Serb
- Suzana Petričević as Andja
- Dragomir Čumić as Peasant who saves Lazar's head
- Josif Tatić as Head Gatekeeper

== See also ==
- Yugoslav films
- Serbian films
