= Predrag Milinković =

Serbian actor

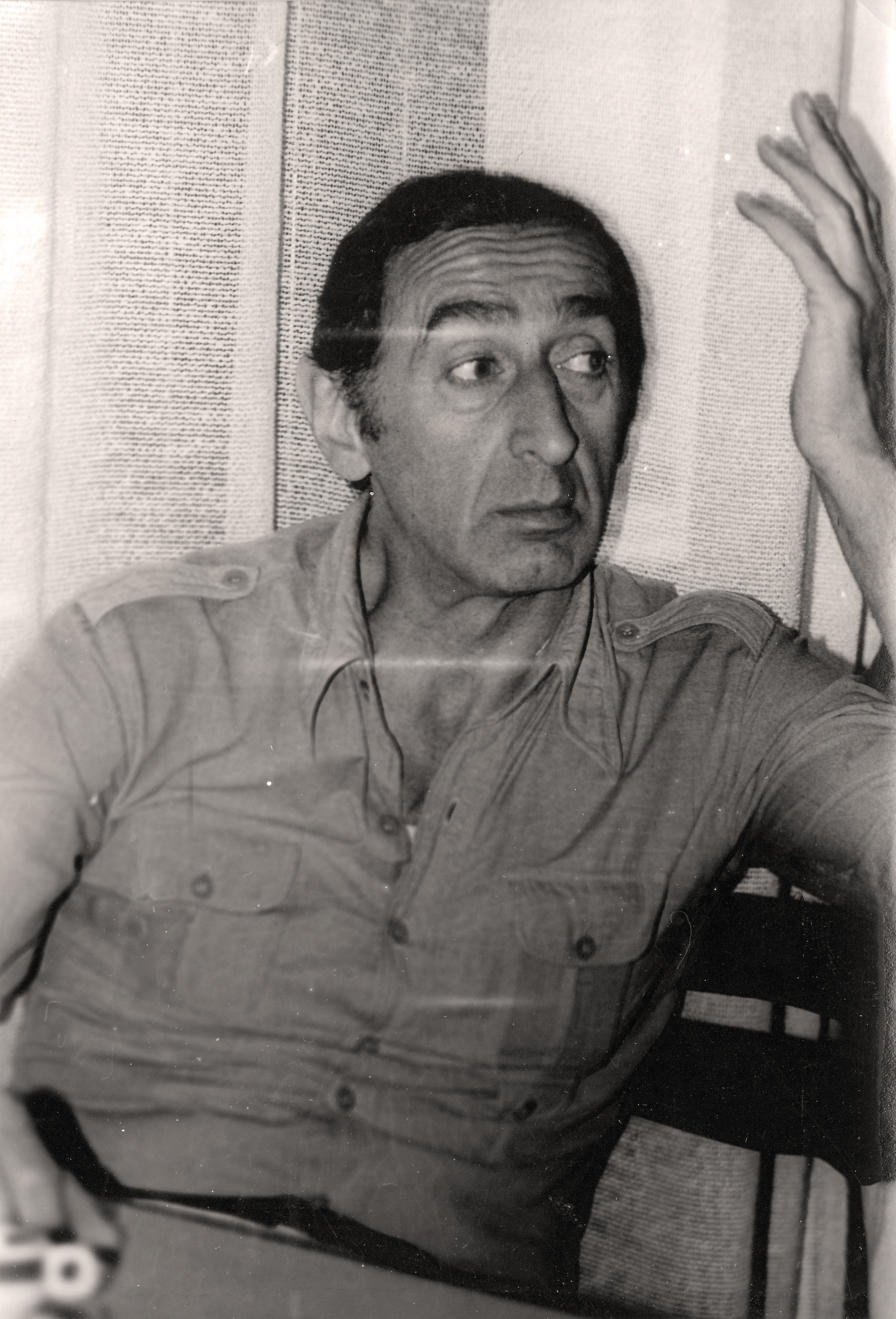
- Predrag Milinković, 1984.
- Born: 20 August 1933; Belgrade, Kingdom of Yugoslavia
- Died: 4 April 1998 (aged 64); Belgrade, Federal Republic of Yugoslavia
- Occupation: Actor
- Years active: 1958–1998

Predrag Milinković (Serbian Cyrillic: Предраг Милинковић; 20 August 1933 – 4 April 1998) was a Serbian actor.

Consider by many to be the most famous supporting actor of Yugoslav cinema, he appeared in 222 films from 1958 to 1998, with majority of his roles ranging from bit to character parts.

== Selected filmography ==
Year	Title	Role	Notes
1989	Battle of Kosovo		
1978	The Tiger	Kelner	
1972	Traces of a Black Haired Girl		
1967	The Rats Woke Up		
1964	March on the Drina		
