= Miodrag Petrović Čkalja =

Serbian actor (1924–2003)

- Миодраг Петровић Чкаља
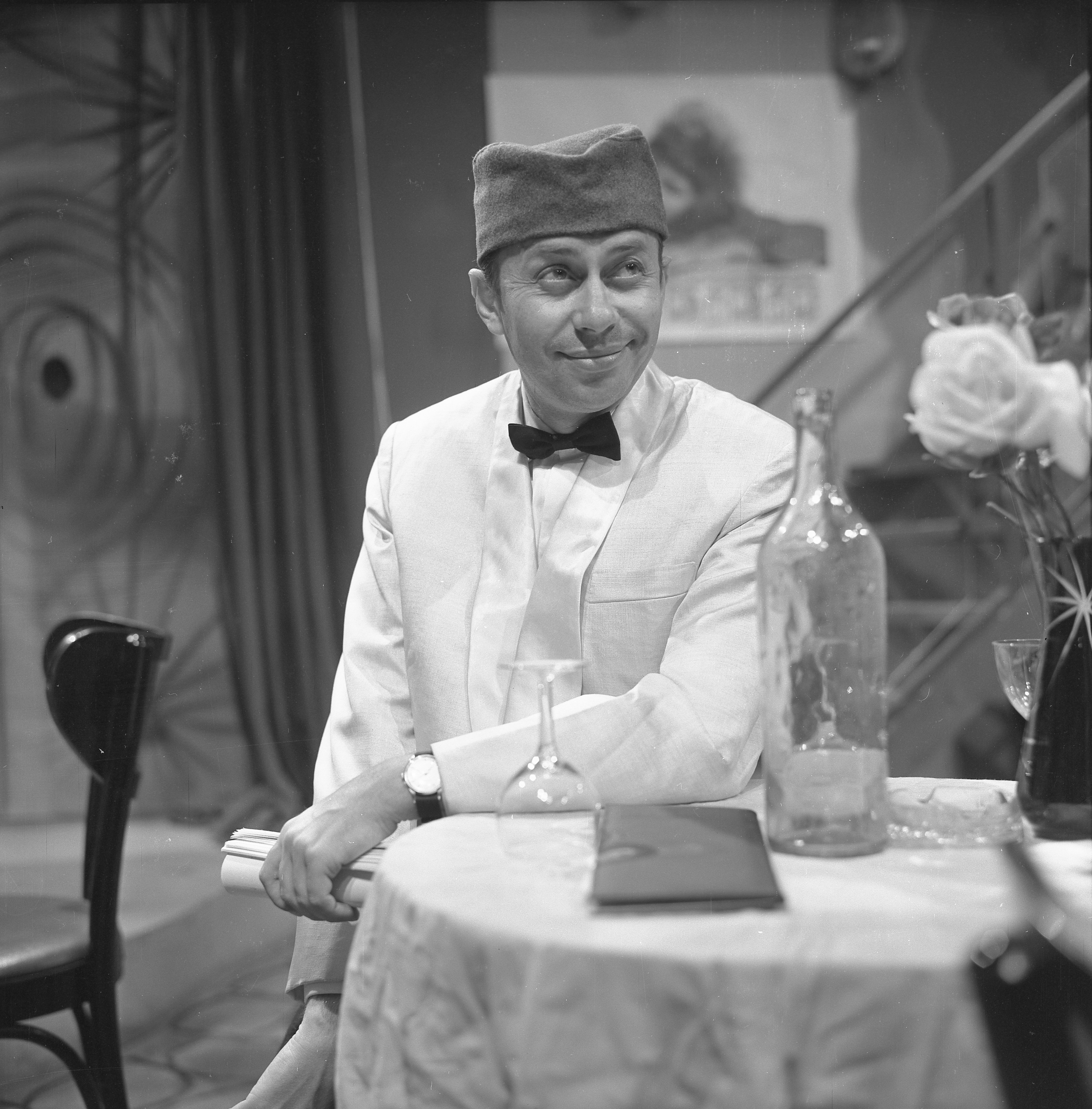
- Čkalja in 1963.
- Born: Miodrag Petrović; 1 April 1924; Kruševac, Kingdom of Serbs, Croats and Slovenes
- Died: 20 October 2003 (aged 79); Belgrade, Serbia and Montenegro
- Occupation: Actor

Miodrag Petrović (1 April 1924 – 20 October 2003), known by his stage name Čkalja, was a Serbian actor and one of the most popular folksy comedians of Socialist Yugoslavia.

== Biography ==
He studied veterinary medicine in Belgrade and started as a voice actor in radio dramas after the Second World War. In 1952, he began to perform in theatre comedies by Branislav Nušić, Georges Feydeau and Nikolai Gogol. However, it was the new medium of television that made him famous. From 1959 to the 1980s, he appeared in about 20 films and many TV comedy shows: Servisna stanica, Dežurna ulica, Spavajte mirno, Sačulatac, Crni sneg, Ljudi i papagaji, Ljubav na seoski način, Kamiondžije (with Paja Vuisić) and Vruć vetar. He also performed sketches on TV and in showbiz, many of which he wrote himself.

Disappointed with the lowly state of humour and the showbiz, which made him hugely popular in Yugoslavia, he left theatre in 1975 and retired soon afterwards. His last public appearance was during the Democratic Opposition of Serbia election campaign in 2000 in the overthrow of Slobodan Milošević.

In 2005, a statue of Čkalja was placed in front of his birth house in Kruševac. In 2006, a street in the Zvezdara neighbourhood of Belgrade was named after him.

== Partial filmography ==
- Jezero (1950) - Crkvenjak
- Crveni cvet (1950) - Profa
- Četiri kilometra na sat (1958) - Profesor psihologije
- Diližansa snova (1960) - Kir Janja (voice, uncredited)
- Ljubav i moda (1960) - Komercijalni direktor
- Zajednički stan (1960) - Pepi
- Nema malih bogova (1964) - Jordan
- Sreća u torbi (1961) - Jordan
- Put oko sveta (1964) - Jovanče Micić
- Na mesto, građanine Pokorni! (1964) - Bora Munja
- Orlovi rano lete (1966) - Poljar Lijan
- Zlatna praćka (1967) - Sibin
- Kad golubovi polete (1968) - Žika Afrika
- Višnja na Tašmajdanu (1968) - Profesor francuskog jezika
- Bog je umro uzalud (1969) - Predrag & Nenad
- Ubistvo na svirep i podmukao način i iz niskih pobuda (1969) - Miodrag Petrović Čkalja (uncredited)
- Silom otac (1969) - Jovanče Micić
- Lepa parada (1970) - Krojač
- Biciklisti (1970) - Jiri
- Paja i Jare (1973) - Živadin Jarić 'Jare'
- Avanture Borivoja Šurdilovića Vruc Vetar (1980) - Blagoje Popović 'Firga'
- Kamiondžije opet voze (1984) - Živadin Jarić 'Jare'
