= The Seventh Continent (1966 film) =

- Directed by: Dušan Vukotić
- Written by: Ružena Fisher
- Produced by: Sidney Glazier
- Starring: Demeter Bitenc
- Cinematography: Karol Krška
- Edited by: Lida Braniš
- Music by: Tomislav Simovic
- Production companies: Jadran Film; Filmové Studio Koliba
- Distributed by: Universal Marion Corporation
- Release date: 12 July 1966
- Running time: 84 minutes
- Country: Yugoslavia
- Language: Croatian

The Seventh Continent (Croatian: Sedmi kontinent) is a 1966 Yugoslav and Czechoslovak co-production film directed by Dušan Vukotić.

== Plot ==
A group of children discovers a new continent, not inhabited by adults. Soon, thousands of children of all races begin to abandon their parents and arrive at the new continent, forming a friendly and joyous society, where everyone is equal. Their parents realize children are going missing all over the world and begin to look for them, but are unaware of the existence of the seventh continent.

== Cast ==
- Demeter Bitenc as White Boy's Father
- Karla Chadimová as General's Wife
- Vanja Drach as Diplomat
- Oudy Rachmat Endang as Yellow Girl's Father
- Mikloš Huba as General
- Jindřich Láznička
- Antun Nalis as Otac djece
- Tomislav Pasarić as White Boy
- Hermina Pipinić as White Boy's Mother
- Abdoulaye Seck as Black Boy
- Viktor Starčić as Expert at Conference
- Iris Vrus as Yellow Girl
- Dano Živojinović

== Production ==
The film was shot in Ulcinj, Montenegro. A number of children of foreign diplomats serving in Yugoslavia were cast in the film. Abdoulaye Seck, playing the role of the Black Boy, was the son of a Senegalese diplomat stationed in Belgrade.

== Themes and reception ==
Croatian film critic Nenad Polimac described the film as a "benign fairytale-like fantasy with a moral". The Croatian Film Association database of Croatian cinema notes the film's criticism of the modern civilization and its mechanisms of repression, as well as its poetic visuals, but also its ultimately excessive idealization of the children's world, stereotypically contrasted with the world of grown-ups.
