= Viktor Starčić =

Serbian actor

- Born: 11 May 1901; Ruse, Ottoman Empire
- Died: 1 June 1980 (aged 79); Belgrade, Yugoslavia
- Occupation: Actor
- Years active: 1927–1981

Viktor Starčić (Serbian Cyrillic: Виктор Старчић; 11 May 1901 – 1 June 1980) was a Serbian actor. He appeared in more than one hundred Yugoslav films from 1927 to 1981.

== Filmography ==
| Year | Title | Role | Notes |
|---|---|---|---|
| 1927 | Gresnica bez greha | | |
| 1949 | Prica o fabrici | Antikvar | |
| 1949 | Majka Katina | Sekretar u Associated Press-u | Uncredited |
| 1950 | Jezero | | |
| 1950 | Crveni cvet | Podpredsednik | |
| 1951 | Bakonja fra Brne | Kusmelj | |
| 1951 | Major Bauk | Agent | |
| 1953 | Opstinsko dete | Sima Nedeljkovic | |
| 1953 | Perfidy | Gospar Frano Drazic | |
| 1954 | Legends of Anika | | |
| 1958 | Dva zrna grozdja | | |
| 1958 | Lazni car | | |
| 1958 | Zenica | Profesor | |
| 1958 | Potrazi Vandu Kos | Prof. Maric | |
| 1958 | Oleko Dundich | Srpski general | |
| 1958 | Miss Stone | Dr. Haus | |
| 1960 | The Fourteenth Day | Zorzov otac | |
| 1961 | Prvi gradjanin male varosi | Konobar Emil | |
| 1961 | Square of Violence | German Commandant | |
| 1961 | Ne diraj u srecu | Profesor | |
| 1962 | Srescemo se veceras | Doktor Petrovic | |
| 1962 | Medaljon sa tri srca | Sima ... profesor | (segment "Prica2") |
| 1962 | Sasa | Profesor matematike | |
| 1963 | Il fornaretto di Venezia | | |
| 1964 | Pod isto nebo | | |
| 1964 | Sette a Tebe | | |
| 1964 | Il vendicatore mascherato | | |
| 1965 | Uncle Tom's Cabin | | |
| 1966 | Kiss Kiss, Kill Kill | | |
| 1966 | The Seventh Continent | Expert at Conference | |
| 1966 | The Dream | Dirigent | |
| 1967 | The 25th Hour | Hurtig | |
| 1967 | The Morning | Stari zarobljenik | |
| 1967 | Dim | Profesor istorije Leder | |
| 1967 | Brown Eye, Evil Eye | | |
| 1970 | Put u raj | Barun Silvester | |
| 1971 | Klopka za generala | Doktorov otac | |
| 1971 | Ovcar | Slavonski gazda | |
| 1975 | Pavle Pavlovic | Lekar | |
| 1977 | Bestije | Kapetan | |
| 1977 | Miris poljskog cveca | Reditelj u pozoristu | |
| 1978 | Ljubav i bijes | | |
