= Svetislav Basara =

Serbian writer and columnist

- Светислав Басара
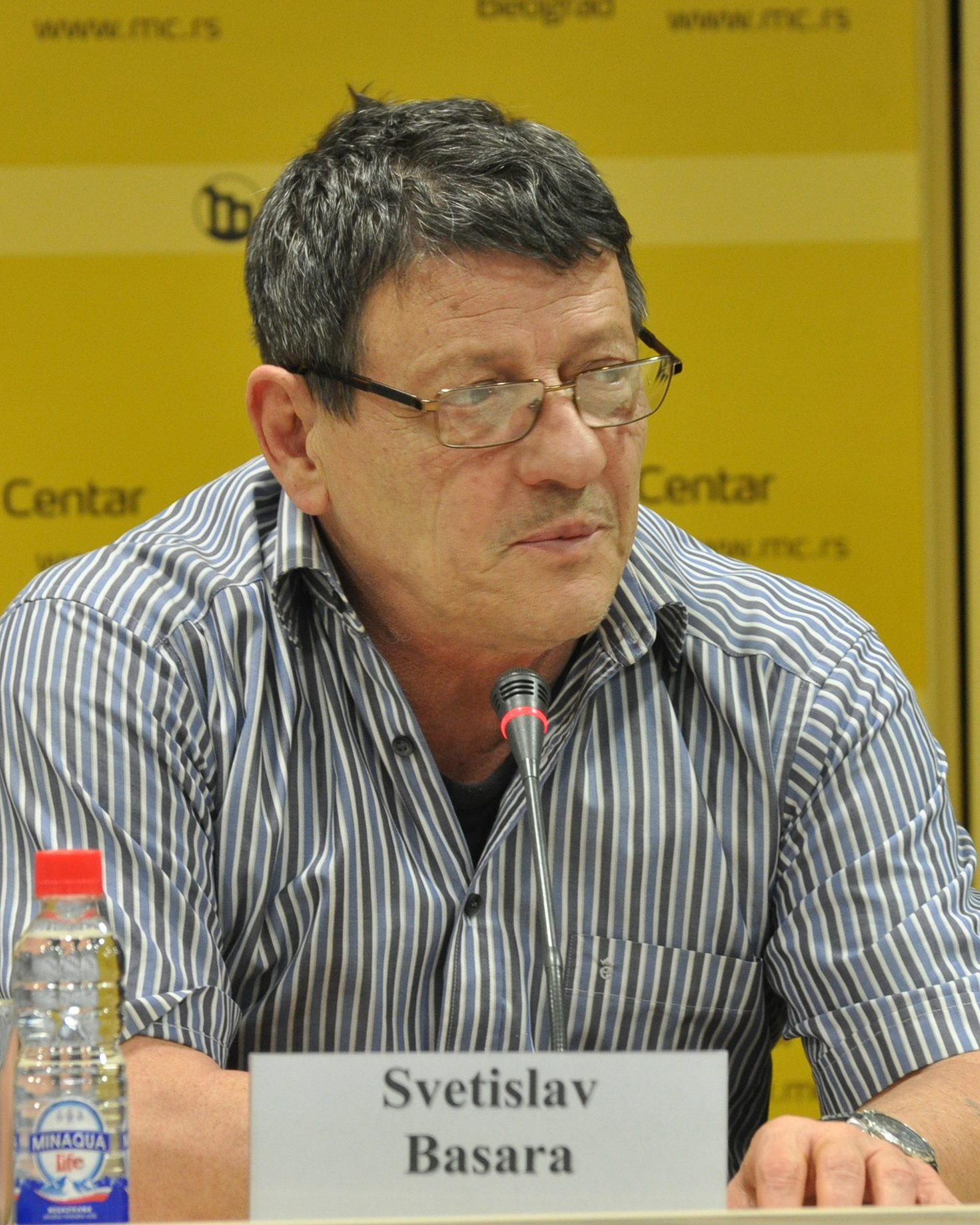
- Basara in 2014
- Born: 21 December 1953 (age 72); Bajina Bašta, FPR Yugoslavia
- Education: Užice Gymnasium; University of Belgrade (no degree)
- Occupation: Writer
- Political party: Democratic Party
- Relatives: Branislav Crnčević (father-in-law)

Svetislav Basara (Serbian Cyrillic: Светислав Басара; born 21 December 1953) is a Serbian writer and columnist.

== Biography ==
Basara grew up in Užice, attended the Gymnasium of the town and graduated with maturity diploma, then he began studying at the Philological Faculty of the University of Belgrade but left the faculty after two semesters without graduation in 1976. The young man started his career as freelance writer and became editor of the literary journals Književna reč (1983–86) and Međaj (1989); many other journals, newspapers and magazines published numerous contributions to literary and cultural-philosophical topics of the author in recent decades, he writes for the column Famous (Famozno) of Danas since 2009. He is the author of more than forty literary works, including novels, short story collections, essays, he is considered to be one of the most important writers of contemporary Serbian literature, and one of the most successful contemporary Serbian authors in the international book market. His complete work is already including one or several editions in Bulgarian, German, English, French, Italian, Dutch, Romanian, Slovenian, Spanish, Hungarian and Ukrainian translation. He received the NIN Prize 2006 for the novel The Rise and Fall of Parkinson's Disease (Uspon i pad Parkinsonove bolesti) and the Isidora Sekulić Award 2015 for his novel Angel of Assassination (Anđeo atentata). Basara wrote the screenplay for Boomerang and his play Hamlet Remake (Hamlet rimejk) premiered at National Theatre Niš in 2001, his seconds-long guest appearance in the role as drug addict in the film Munje! is an amusing edge note of his artistic biography. Five works have already been published in English, translated by Randall Major, Department of Anglistics, University of Novi Sad.

Basara was the ambassador of FR Yugoslavia (Serbia and Montenegro) in Cyprus from 2001 to 2005. The artist is current member of the Democratic Party (DS) but had changed his party affiliation in the past for several times and was temporary member of the Democratic Party of Serbia (DSS) as well as Christian Democratic Party (DHSS). In any case, the author takes a clear and unambiguous position in a political sense: he calls in question any form of political extremism in his country, and dismantles it into its absurd components in literary way. The titles of the novel Mein Kampf: burleska (allusion to Mein Kampf) and the collection of essays Vučji brlog (Little Wolf's Lair; not to be confused with Wolf's Lair) are provocative confrontations to related topics of Serbian extremist self-images. Basara was already denigrated because of his critical and cosmopolitan attitude, for example, by the far-right group of the Serbian national movement Naši.

On 28 December 2019, the Montenegrin President Milo Đukanović signed a new freedom of religion act, which caused unrest in Montenegro and provoked some political reaction from Serbia. An official response is an Appeal for condemning the threat to peace in Montenegro, signed by more than eighty prominent personalities of former Yugoslavia including Basara; it says, among other things, that several European institutions and governments of democratic countries are condemning the new attempt to destabilize Montenegro on the principles of Slobodan Milošević's policies. Political, ecclesiastical and media campaigns of misinformation from Belgrade, which is being implemented in both Podgorica and Banja Luka, have seriously threatened peace not only in Montenegro, but throughout the region. Monuments of such policy are genocide, ethnic cleansing, war and crimes against humanity committed in Croatia, Bosnia and Herzegovina and Kosovo.

The writer is also signatory of the Declaration on the Common Language of the Croats, Serbs, Bosniaks and Montenegrins within the project Languages and Nationalisms (Jezici i nacionalizmi). The declaration is against political separation of four Serbo-Croatian standard variants that leads to a series of negative social, cultural and political phenomena in which linguistic expression is enforced as a criterion of ethno-national affiliation and as a means of political loyalty in successor states of Yugoslavia.

Dobrila Basara, his mother, grew up as an orphan under the care of Svetislav Veizović and his family, who was arrested, charged and shot by Partisans under pretext during the time of the Republic of Užice in 1941. The mother baptized her son in honor and in memory of this man by his given name, who was rehabilitated as an innocent victim in 2013 only. Svetislav Basara is the father of two children (daughter Tara and son Relja) and was married to Branislav Crnčević's daughter Vida, who is also the mother of the children, and his second residence is in Beška.

He once said in an interview: It’s the same with people as with money, the more of something there is, the less valuable it is. Hyperinflation of humanity. Fatigue. The crisis of meaning…. nothing exists except for selling and buying.

When there is talk of theories, I always think of Baudrillard’s definition that - I paraphrase - theory might be a trap, in which the reality should blunder in. Reality too often blunders in these apparently naive traps, to its own and our chagrin. I think that farce, exaggeration and non earnestness are the very best tools for writing about the so-called „serious things“. I also have a citation ready for this assertion. In the 1950s, an Italian actor and comedian, who felt strongly connected to religion, wrote a letter to Padre Pio, the famous mystic and stigmatist. He complained in it that he was unable to devote to the spirit, because he had to go on stage with makeup each evening and make a fool of himself. Padre Pio gave him following answer: „My son, these scruples are groundless. We all make morons of ourselves in the places that providence has determined for us.“ Great misfortune happens when a human being takes itself and the world in which it lives too seriously. Svetislav Basara, June 2014

== Works ==
Serbian editions

- Priče u nestajanju (1982)
- Peking by Night (1985)
- Kinesko pismo (Chinese Letter, 1985)
- Napuklo ogledalo (1986)
- Na ivici (1987)
- Fama o biciklistima (The Cyclist Conspiracy, 1987)
- Fenomeni (1989)
- Na Gralovom tragu (In Search of the Grail, 1990)
- Mongolski bedeker (Mongolian Travel Guide, 1992)
- Tamna strana meseca (1992)
- Izabrane priče (1994)
- De bello civili (1993)
- Drvo istorije (1995)
- Ukleta zemlja (1995)
- Virtualna kabala (1996)
- Looney Tunes (1997)
- Sveta mast (1998)
- Vučji brlog (1998)
- Ideologija heliocentrizma (1999)
- Mašine iluzija (2000)
- Kratkodnevnica (2000)
- Džon B. Malkovič (2001)
- Bumerang (2001)
- Oksimoron (2001)
- Srce Zemlje (2004)
- Fantomski bol (2005)
- Uspon i pad Parkinsonove bolesti, (2006)
- Izgubljen u samoposluzi (2008)
- Majmunopisanije (2008)
- Dnevnik Marte Koen (2008)
- Nova Stradija (2009)
- Fundamentalizam debiliteta (2009)
- Na gralovom tragu (2010)
- Eros, giros i Tanatos (2010)
- Početak bune protiv dahija (2010)
- Tajna istorija Bajine Bašte (2010)
- Mein Kampf (2011; allusion to Mein Kampf)
- Dugovečnost (2012)
- Gnusoba (2013)
- Tušta i tma (2014), with Miljenko Jergović
- Yugonostalghia (2015)
- Anđeo atentata (2015)
- Drugi krug (2015), with Miljenko Jergović
- Očaj od nane (2016)
- Andrićeva lestvica užasa (2016)
- Pušači crvenog bana (2017)
- Nova srpska trilogija (2017)
- Atlas pseudomitologije (2018)
- Bajakovo-Batrovci, with Miljenko Jergović, (2020)
- Kontraendorfin (2020)
- Đinđić: memoari s onu stranu groba (2026)

English editions

- The Prince of Fire: Anthology of Contemporary Serbian Short Stories, contains A Letter From Hell by Basara, University of Pittsburgh Press 1998, ISBN 978-0-8229-4058-6.
- Chinese Letter, Dalkey Archive Press, London 2004, ISBN 978-1-56478-374-5.
- The Cyclist Conspiracy, Open Letter Rochester, Rochester 2012, ISBN 978-1-934824-58-0, (First English edition, Geopoetika, Belgrade 2009).
- Fata Morgana : a compendium of short fiction, Dalkey Archive Press, Victoria 2015, ISBN 978-1-62897-113-2.
- In Search of the Grail, Dalkey Archive Press, Victoria 2017, ISBN 978-1-94315-019-9.
- The Mongolian Travel Guide, Dalkey Archive Press, McLean 2018, ISBN 978-1-62897-250-4.
- The Rise and Fall of Parkinson's Disease, Dalkey Archive Press, Dallas 2026, ISBN 978-1628976328

== Awards (selection) ==
- NIN Award (2006), for Rise and Fall of Parkinson's Disease
- Biljana Jovanović Award (2015), for Angel of Assassination (Archduke is first-person narrator)
- Isidora Sekulić Award (2015), for Angel of Assassination
- NIN Award (2020), for Kontraendorfin
