= Traces of a Black Haired Girl =

1972 film

- Directed by: Zdravko Randić
- Written by: Dragoljub Ivkov; Zivojin Pavlovic
- Starring: Pavle Vujisic
- Cinematography: Milorad Jaksic-Fandjo
- Edited by: Olga Skrigin
- Release date: 7 June 1972
- Running time: 86 minutes
- Country: Yugoslavia
- Language: Serbo-Croatian

Traces of a Black Haired Girl (Serbo-Croatian: Tragovi crne devojke) is a 1972 Yugoslav film directed by Zdravko Randić. It was entered into the 22nd Berlin International Film Festival.

== Cast ==
- Pavle Vujisic - Paja
- Boris Dvornik
- Neda Spasojevic - Slavica
- Ruzica Sokic
- Velimir 'Bata' Zivojinovic - Sinter
