= Beach Guard in Winter =

1976 film

- Serbo-Croatian: Čuvar plaže u zimskom periodu
- Directed by: Goran Paskaljević
- Written by: Gordan Mihić
- Starring: Irfan Mensur; Gordana Kosanović; Danilo Stojković; Mira Banjac
- Cinematography: Aleksandar Petković
- Edited by: Olga Skrigin
- Music by: Zoran Hristić
- Production company: Centar Film
- Release date: June 1976
- Running time: 90 minutes
- Country: Yugoslavia
- Language: Serbo-Croatian

Beach Guard in Winter (Serbo-Croatian: Čuvar plaže u zimskom periodu) is a 1976 Yugoslav film directed by Goran Paskaljević. It was entered into the 26th Berlin International Film Festival.

== Cast ==
- Irfan Mensur as Dragan Pasanović
- Gordana Kosanović as Ljubica Miladinović
- Danilo Stojković as Milovan Pasanović (Dragan's father)
- Mira Banjac as Spasenija Pasanović (Dragan's mother)
- Dara Čalenić as Dragan's Aunt
- Bata Živojinović as Ljubica's Father
- Pavle Vuisić as Buda
- Ružica Sokić as Widow
- Faruk Begolli as Dragan's Friend
- Ana Krasojević as Ljubica's Mother
- Janez Vrhovec as Orchestra Leader
- Dragomir Felba as Chauffeur
- Bora Todorović as Petar Dunjić
- Dušan Janićijević as Film Director
- Milivoje Tomić as Laundry Boss
- Stevan Minja as Ljubica's Uncle
- Vladan Živković as Gastarbeiter
