= Jelica Sretenović =

Serbian actress (born 1954)

- Born: 3 March 1954 (age 72); Belgrade, Yugoslavia
- Occupation: Actor
- Years active: 1975-present

Jelica Sretenović (born 3 March 1954) is a Serbian actress. She appeared in more than seventy films since 1975.

== Selected filmography ==
Year	Title	Role	Notes
2002	Zona Zamfirova	Kaliopa	
1988	Migrations		
1983	Nešto između	Jelica	
1982	A Tight Spot	Suzana	
1978	The Tiger		
