= The Rats Woke Up =

1967 film

- Directed by: Živojin Pavlović
- Written by: Dragoljub Ivkov; Ljubiša Kozomara; Gordan Mihić; Momčilo Milankov
- Produced by: Duško Ercegović
- Starring: Slobodan Perović; Dušica Žegarac; Severin Bijelić; Mirjana Blašković; Nikola Milić; Milivoje "Mića" Tomić; Pavle Vuisić
- Cinematography: Milorad Jakšić Fanđo
- Edited by: Olga Skrigin
- Release date: 26 January 1967
- Running time: 79 minutes
- Country: Yugoslavia
- Language: Serbo-Croatian

The Rats Woke Up (Serbo-Croatian: Буђење пацова, romanized: Buđenje pacova) is a 1967 Yugoslavian drama film directed by Živojin Pavlović.

It was entered into the 17th Berlin International Film Festival where Pavlović won the Silver Bear for Best Director.

== Cast ==
- Slobodan Perović as Velimir Bamberg
- Dušica Žegarac
- Severin Bijelić as Lale ... fotograf
- Mirjana Blašković
- Nikola Milić as Konobar
- Milivoje "Mića" Tomić as Milorad
- Pavle Vuisić as Krmanos
- Ljubomir Ćipranić as Pera UDBA
- Mira Dinulovic
- Tomanija Đuričko
- Milan Jelić as Student
- Ljiljana Jovanović
- Nada Kasapic
- Snezana Lukic
- Petar Lupa
- Vojislav Micovic
- Predrag Milinković as Gost u kafani
- Olga Poznatov
- Alenka Rancic
- Dusan Tadic
- Minja Vojvodić
- Gizela Vukovic
