= Branislav Crnčević =

Serbian writer and politician (1933–2011)

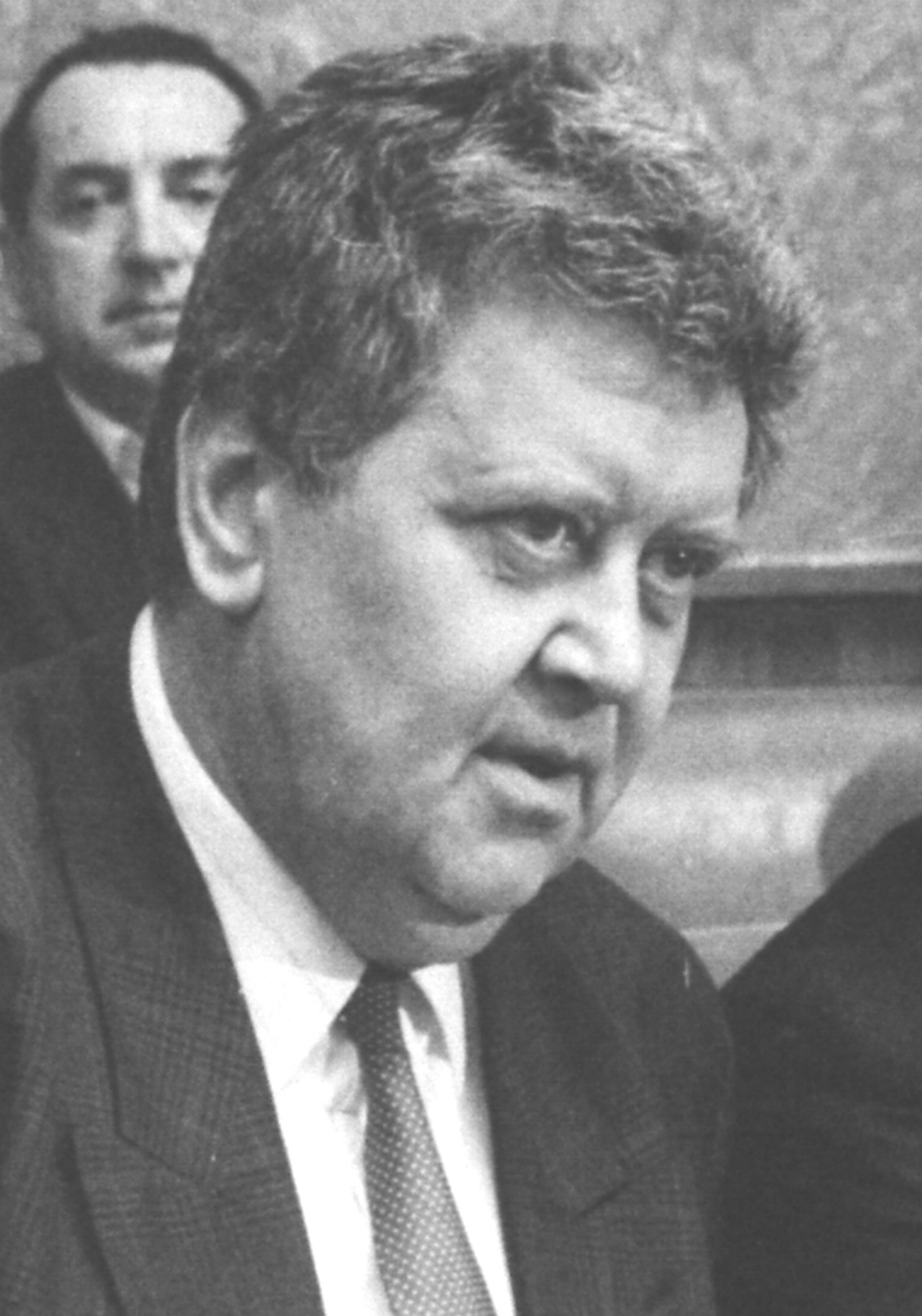
- Born: 8 February 1933; Kovačica, Kingdom of Yugoslavia
- Died: 14 April 2011 (aged 78); Belgrade, Serbia
- Resting place: Belgrade New Cemetery
- Education: University of Belgrade Faculty of Philosophy
- Occupations: Writer, politician
- Children: Vida, Ivan and Mina
- Relatives: Svetislav Basara (son-in-law)
- Writing career
- Period: 1963–2011

Branislav "Brana" Crnčević (Serbian Cyrillic: Бранислав Брана Црнчевић, Serbian pronunciation: [brǎnislaʋ brâːna tsř̩ntʃeʋitɕ]; 8 February 1933 – 14 April 2011) was a Serbian writer and politician.

Throughout his decades-long career, he wrote novels, aphorisms, short stories, TV dramas, poems and children's literature.

== Biography ==
Crnčević was born on 8 February 1933 in Kovačica and was raised in Ruma. After the death of his father, he spent his childhood in orphanages and foster homes.

He graduated from the University of Belgrade Faculty of Philosophy. He began his career as an employee of the Zrenjanin brewery regional office in Novi Sad. He then worked as a journalist and editor in the newspapers Jež and Duga along with the newspaper for children called Mali jež. He also published columns in various newspapers and magazines such as NIN and Politika. In the meantime, he published his first children's book Bosonogi i nebo and later his first collection of aphorisms Piši kao što ćutiš. He entered into the literary scene under the pseudonyms Vinon Rumski and Branislav BIP. He was also one of the screenwriters for the 1987 film The Harms Case.

In addition to his literary career, Crnčević was also engaged politically and was friends with Slobodan Milošević. In 1990, he was elected president of the Matica iseljenika Srbije (Heritage Foundation of Serbia). He was a member of the Serb Democratic Party, and an advocate of the innocence of Radovan Karadžić before the Hague Tribunal. After the departure of Vojislav Šešelj to The Hague, he joined the Serbian Radical Party, but after the split of that party into two political options, he followed Tomislav Nikolić to the Serbian Progressive Party. Crnčević was chosen as a member of the Senate of Republika Srpska in 1996 and was awarded the Order of Njegoš (first degree).

== Death and legacy ==
Crnčević died on 14 April 2011 after a long illness. He is interred in the Alley of Distinguished Citizens in the Belgrade New Cemetery in a joint plot with Milutin Čolić, Mladen Srbinović and Momo Kapor.

The cultural center in Ruma is named after him. In September 2016, a street in the Vračar municipality of the city of Belgrade was named after him.

== Works ==
- 1963. Bosonogi i nebo
- 1963. Cipelice od krokodilske kože
- 1963. Njen prvi čaj
- 1965. Devojka sa tri oca
- 1965. Kafanica, sudnica, ludnica (also performed as a performance in Atelje 212)
- 1965. Piši kao što ćutiš
- 1968. Dunavo
- 1967 – 1971 Zanati
- 1971. Kapetan i lula
- 1971, 1981, 1989, 2006. Dnevnik jednog...
- 1978. Peta strana sveta
- 1982. Sibiri
- 1982. Emigrant i igra
- 1984. Mrav dobra srca
- 1985. Snovi bez tumačenja
- 1990, 2006. Srpska posla
- 1992, 2006. Srpska i hrvatska posla
- 1994. Glasnik
- 1997. Crni đavo, crveni rep I-II 2001. III
- 2001. Pesme
- 2003. Zaštitnica umetnosti i druge pripovetke
- 2005. Zemlja nadimaka
- 2006. Knjiga zadušnica
- 2006. Obećani svet
- 2007. Sedam mokrih majica i drugi zapisi
- 2008. Ima da nas nema
- 2009. Čuvari pepela
- 2010. Šta ima
- 2010. Piši kao što ćutiš (amended, supplemented and expanded edition)
- 2011. Crni đavo, crveni rep I-II
- 2011. Zaštitnica umetnosti i druge pripovetke
- 2012. Trosobna samica / Трёхкомнатная одиночка, drama
