= Zoran Hristić =

Serbian composer (1938–2019)

Zoran Hristić (Serbian Cyrillic: Зоран Христић; 30 July 1938–12 November 2019) was a Serbian composer. He had a freelance artist status for a long time. At the initiative of Dušan Radović in 1979, he was nominated an editor, director and founder of the Concert Studio B. from 1982 to 1989, he was the chief music editor of Radio Belgrade, and then moved on RTVB, later RTS where he was editor in chief of the editorial board of Music programme until 1995.

He was the artistic director of BEMUS and "Mokranjac days" festivals as well as a selector. He improved the Trumpet Festival in Guča.

== Biography ==
Hristić was born and died in Belgrade. His musical education began at his early age. He played piano, and the first song he wrote was a Play for the piano (1949). At age 15, he wrote Toccata for piano and won the student competition, after which he enrolled in composition classes at the Conservatory Giuseppe Verdi in Milan, with professor Niccolò Castiglioni. He continued to study at the Music Academy of Belgrade with Dr Stanojlo Rajičić, graduating in 1963. He received the prestigious Stevan Hristić Award for the best thesis Titles for the chorus and orchestra.

Hristić's work includes solo and chamber works, vocal and instrumental works, ballets, radiophonic works, music for theater, film and television. His compositions have been performed by prominent national and international performers.

"I have never accepted that it is important to write music just for oneself and I think one is deceived by the artist who says he does not care about communication and influence. Art means to influence".

== Awards ==
- Stevan Hristić Award (1963) for a thesis Titles for the choir and orchestra
- Yugoslav Broadcasting Award for Chamber Music (1967) for piano trio 4 for E
- Golden Arena (1967), for the music in the film Hasanaginica
- Golden Arena (1969) for the music in the films Crows and Horoscope
- Stage Music Award - Meetings of Puppet Theatre (1972, 1973)
- 4th July prize(1974) for the Darinka’s Gift ballet
- Stage Music Award - Meetings of Vojvodina Puppet Theatres (1974),
- Golden Harp Award - Television Festival in the City of Galaway, Ireland (1984) for the radiophonic work Battle
- Stage Music Award for the play Balkan Myths in the 24th Festival of Puppet Theaters in Zrenjanin, Serbia (1991)
- Stage Music Award at 38th Sterijino pozorje (1993) for the music for the play Koštana
- Stage Music Award at 47th Sterijino pozorje (2002) for the music for the play Siege of St. Saviour temple.
- Golden Ring Award for Lifetime Achievement (2012).

== Style ==
Hristić belongs to a generation of composers who entered into Serbian musical constellation in the early 1970s. Other representatives of this generation are Petar Bergamo and Rajko Maksimović. This avant-garde five was characterized by an effort to achieve a new expression and not to stand side of the current trends, which successfully compensated and overcame the time lag of our musical avant-garde in comparison to analogous phenomena in European music. They connected avant-garde level of Serbian and European music on the basis of their specific relationship to the past. Hristić met with the European avant-garde in the late fifties, when his composition professor in Milan, Castiglioni acquainted him with contemporary Italian music and Schoenberg dodecaphony.

In Hristić thesis Titles for the chorus and symphony orchestra (1963) he, for the first time achieved the use of the elements of the Polish music school (primarily Penderecki) in the Serbian music. It’s not about the principles of Penderecki’s aleatoricism, although Hristić is strongly connected to Penderecki by the treatment of the twelve chromatic scales often distributed in clusters of "short" seconds, complete lack of thematic material, and particularly the use of instruments and choral that achieve the sound effects that are close to noise.

After the impact of the new Polish music, Hristić evolved towards distinctive tonal language, in which sporadic elements of serial structures were in service of creating almost bizarre tonal composing. His art has developed into a line that runs from the lower chamber of interest to the broad forms of intervention in the field of theatre, vocal and instrumental music. Although close to a generation of Bergamo, Ozgijanu, Radovanović and Maksimović, Zoran Hristić’s style, in his own words, is closer to Croat composers Detoni, Kuljerić and Foretić while he recognizes the local influence only from Vladan Radovanović.

== List of works ==
=== The student works ===
- Bach, Schoenberg Bi-bap, variations for piano (premiere Ljubljana 1961) Recording: Radio Belgrade, Nada Vujičić.
- Visa Sonata for clarinet and piano (premiere Ljubljana 1961) Recording: RTB, Ernest and Oliver Ačkun Đurđević.
- Titles, music for chorus and orchestra, graduate work. Written on lyrics of B. Miljković and T. Mladenović (premiered at the panel Yugoslav musical creativity in Opatija, 1965, Chorus and Orchestra of the Slovenian Philharmonic Orchestra)

=== Individual works ===
- Moments at 12, for bassoon and strings (1963) Recording: Radio Belgrade, and Turšič soloist, conductor Oskar Danon
- Tales XX, piano, children piano and violin. (Premiered 1968) Recording: Radio Belgrade and RTB, Simonuti-Đurđević
- 4 for E, Piano Trio (premiere BEMUS 1969) Recording: RTB, Belgrade trio
- Kardiogrami, for chamber string orchestra (1968) Recording: Radio Belgrade, conductor: Z. Hristić
- Empty strings for the full-figured, for chamber string orchestra. (Premiered in 1968, at a concert of the newly founded Belgrade Chamber Orchestra, for which the work was written. Piece was performed at the Youth Festival in Paris (1969), and it was on the Zagreb Soloists ensemble program on tour in the U.S.)
- La-gis, for 14 instruments and two singers. (Premiered 1969) Written for New Music Ensemble, conductor D. Skovran
- Kepadam, written for the new instrument - iglatura from architect P. Ristić, (premiered at the Music Biennale Zagreb in 1971), Video: RTB
- Reality, string quartet, written for Serbian String Quartet (premiered 1973) Publicly performed and recorded for French radio
- Situations, for piano trio, Recording: Radio Belgrade, Academic trio, solo O. Milošević.
- Calm, the bass solo, (1975), written for Lj. Samardžinski, Recording RTB and PGP RTB LP
- Within 8, for string chamber orchestra. (premiered in 1977, at the Music Biennale Zagreb by Belgrade Chamber Orchestra conductor U. Lajovic. Remained in the repertoire of the Vienna Chamber Orchestra and Swedish radio Chamber orekstra). Recording by RTB
- Anticoncert, for violin, synthesizers and symphony orchestra. (Premiered in 1983, at the opening of XII International Festival of Contemporary Music, Zagreb) Soloists: J. Kolundžija, S. Marković, Zagreb Symphony Orchestra, conductor U. Lajovic.
- 15 per Stevan handle, for wind quintet (premiered 2009, at the festival Mokranjac days) by Belgrade Philharmonic Brass Quintet
- Poem for voice solo and flute choir (premiered at RTS show on Sunday night, 2012), sung by Ana Sofrenović and the ensemble Flautino classic

=== Vocal and instrumental works ===
- Creation of world - the Flood, for the chorus and orchestra (premiered 1964), ordered by Radio Belgrade 3rd Programme, literary sketch by L. Da Vinci. Recording: Radio Belgrade, Chorus and Orchestra of the RTB, the author conducts
- Moratorium for four reciters, mixed choir, children's choir and symphony orchestra (premiered 1971), ordered for the opening of the new Memorial Park in Kraljevo 1971st
- Genealogy, on verse poem of peasant-poet Srboljub Mitić, for 5 groups of 5 singers, a rattle, gusle and chamber orchestra. (Premiered in 1972, on Marble and Sounds Festival, Aranđelovac, Collegium Musicum Choir, conductor Darinka Matić-Marović), BEMUS 1972nd That same year, when Genealogy was created, the Collegium Musicum Choir was founded to which this composition was dedicated. The work was later visualized – directed by Novaković.
- The Warning, oratorio on the Yugoslav poets verses, for solo soprano, solo bass, two mixed choirs, children's choir and a symphony orchestra - Orders (premiere 1974) JNA Contractors artistic ensemble and children's choir RTB, conductor A. Šurev
- Fires of July (premiere 1975), cantata for brass orchestra, chorus and ballet
- The world is in sight, oratorio for the three soloists, female chorus, bass chorus, children's choir, a marching band, percussion ensemble and nine minstrels., (Premiere 1976, at Vuk Parliament), conductor F. Klinar
- Mira words, the cantata in May on verses of D. Brajkovic, premiered in 1977). The work was specially written and performed in the traditional May Day Eve concert in front of the National Assembly in Belgrade. The participants were all amateur choirs from Belgrade, the ensemble of the House Guard, baritone solo and ballet ensemble.
- In the name of the truth, an essay for soprano, bass solo, mixed choir two, children's choir and a symphony orchestra, the verses by B. Miljković and D. Brajković (premiered in 1978). Snapshot: RTB, mixed and children's choir RTB, mixed choir anambla JNA RTB Symphony Orchestra, soloists R. Smiljanić and M. Čangalović, conductor O. Danon.
- Songs of Freedom, the children's choir, mixed choir, two vocal soloists, two reciters, large brass orchestra (premiered 1980), conductor M. Petras. The order to open the Memorial Complex in Čačak. TV transmission network for the entire TSA.
- Step, choreo-oratorio on the verses by B. Miljković for five vocal soloists, children's choir, two mixed choirs, a symphony orchestra, folk and electronic instruments, 18 soloists, ballet and folk dance ensemble. Direction and choreography M. Mišković, sets and costumes M. Tabački. Premiere in October 1980, at the Great Hall of Sava Center in honor of the twenty-first General Conference of UNESCO, as well as the opening of the XII BEMUS. conductor A. Šurev. Snapshot: Radio Belgrade, RTB, RTB LP
- The flower of freedom, on the verses by Đ. Radišić, for a brass band, children's choir and mixed (premiere 1984), orders for Big school lesson in Kragujevac. It took a large brass orchestra and mixed choir, children's choir, composed of 1500 students from Kragujevac. Snapshot: PGP RTB LP
- Jugoslavika, big game for symphony orchestra (premiered 1984), the order for the opening of the Winter Olympics in Sarajevo.
- Legacy, the cow horn, viola and orchestra. (Premiered 1988), BEMUS women soloists. Grujic and V. Savic. RTB Symphony Orchestra, conductor A. Baltas.

=== Ballets ===
- Chameleon, TV ballet choreography and libretto by A. Radošević, the main role of L. Pilipenko (premiered in 1972). This is the first stage of Zoran Hristić work, but also the first televised ballet. This ballet is an example of the composer's "escape" from a classical orchestra composition (soprano saxophone, alto saxophone, trumpet, harpsichord, "Hammond" organ, Hawaiian guitar, electric guitar, bass guitar, gong, lazy, Jew's harp, rattle, stones, bells, timpani, vibraphone, harp, string quartet, quartet singing, audiotape).
- Darinka's gift, book B. Božović choreographer V. Kostić (premiere in 1974, the opening parade of Marble and Sounds, Aranđelovac). Title role L. Pilipenko, ballet ensemble of the National Theatre in Belgrade. That same year, the Belgrade premiere opened BEMUS. Professor Ben Arnold (Ben Arnold) from the University of Kentucky (University of Kentucky, USA) in his doctoral dissertation included Hristić's ballet in five major anti-war achievements made in the twentieth century.
- Narcissus, TV ballet libretto by V. Krnjević (premiered 1976). Produced and recorded in the Music studio called Puzzle, a study performed in Modern dance studio from Zagreb and choreographed by I. Šerbedžija.
- Adam and Eve, according to legend by Miroslav Krleza (premiered 1981), ordered by Sarajevo Ballet. The first ballet in this region composed exclusively for electronic instruments, it’s the experiment with six different electronic instruments transferred to tape. Music belongs to the communication avantgarde, and combines contemporary sound experience and a wide range of colors, short tracks and improvisation. Ballet performed at the Dubrovnik Summer Festival and the BEMUS year later.
- Tašana, (1992), on the initiative of the National Theatre in Belgrade. The author is a ballet devoted sister.
- Tin Drum, based and produced in association with the Nobel Prize winner the German writer Günter Grass, direction and choreography by Isidora Stanišić (premiere May 2002). Performers: ballet ensemble and orchestra of the National Theatre in Belgrade.

=== Radiophonic works ===
- Battle (premiere 1989), the first radiophonic work by Zoran Hristić, ordered regarding 600th anniversary of the Battle of Kosovo. Battle is visualized by S. Novaković, first broadcast Ohrid January 1989.
- Colors of illusion, (premiere April 1990, the SCC). Setting N. Antonović with the dance group Mimart. Color appearance use parts from earlier Hristić's compositions
- Ratcatcher, (premiere November 1990, in Bitef theater). This ballet is a play based on scetches by B. Kršić, who addressed the topic of the art of medieval legend and myth of Ratcatcher. This is the first choreography of S. Pervan, while worked for Belgrade theatres.
- Boat of the mad, radiophonic work inspired by allegorical paintings of Hieronymus Bosch which is a shortened version of Ratcatcher.

=== Spiritual music ===
- The Cross Force, the text of prayers to Saint Simeon Theodosius from Hilandar of the thirteenth century, for mixed choir (premiere 1988, Kolarac), ordered by the Serbian Orthodox Church to celebrate eight centuries of the Hilandar monastery.
- Ten speaking of Threehanded Virgin from Hilandar for two choirs, soloists and four keyboards (premiere 2007, Kolarac).

=== Music for the theatre ===
Hristić composed the music for all of Belgrade's theaters as well as theaters in Novi Sad, Zagreb, Sarajevo, Titograd, Skopje, Mostar, Rijeka, Banja Luka, Subotica Vrsac, Šabac, Zaječar, Niš, Leskovac and Kragujevac. First music for the theater he wrote in 1958 for performances in Red and Blue in rainbow and Little box that plays for Youth Theatre in Belgrade.

Significant achievements:

- Woyzeck - music for piano four hands - director: Bojan Stupica, Studio 212, Belgrade (1959)
- Macbeth - director: Boro Drašković, Sarajevo National Theatre (1962)
- Danton's Death - director: Miroslav Belović, Yugoslav Drama Theatre, Belgrade (1963)
- Midsummer Night's Dream - director: M. Belović, Yugoslav Drama Theatre, Belgrade (1963)
- Zona Zamfirova - Serbian National Theatre, Novi Sad
- Alarm - director: Ljubomir Draškić, Yugoslav Drama Theatre, Belgrade (1963)
- People with four fingers - director: Gradimir Mirković, National Theatre, Belgrade
- Coup - director: Željko Orešković, Contemporary Theatre, Belgrade
- Koštana - director: Ž. Mićunović, the National Theatre in Niš, (1993)
- The siege of the Church of the Holy Savior - director: Goran Petrović, National Theatre Sombor (2002)
- Маратонци трче почасни круг - musical (author of the songs are Irena Popović and Mark Grubić), director: Kokan Mladenović, Terazije Theatre (2008)
- The Dervish and the Death - director: Egon Savin, National Theatre, Belgrade (2009)

=== Music for films ===
- The Man from the Oak Forest - directed by Miodrag Popović (1964)
- Destination Death - directed by Wolfgang Staudte (1964)
- The Swarm - directed by Miodrag Popović (1966)
- Soldier - directed by George Breakston (1966)
- Grajski biki - directed by Jože Pogačnik (1967)
- Restless - directed by Vojislav "Kokan" Rakonjac (1967)
- Hasanaginica - directed by Miodrag Popović (1967)
- Wild Shadows - directed by Vojislav "Kokan" Rakonjac (1967)
- The Sun of Foreign Heaven - directed by Milutin Kosovac (1968)
- Poor Maria - directed by Dragoslav Lazić (1968)
- Lelejska gora - directed by Zdravko Velimirović (1968)
- Horoscope - directed by Boro Drašković (1969)
- Crows - directed by Gordan Mihić (1969)
- Torrid - directed by Đorđe Kadijević (1970)
- Ballad of the Cruel - directed by Radivoje "Lola" Đukić (1971)
- Breakfast with the Devil - directed by Miroslav Antić (1971)
- Mirko and Slavko - directed by Branimir "Tori" Janković (1973)
- Guns of War - directed by Živorad Mitrović (1974)
- Death and the Dervish - directed by Zdravko Velimirović (1974)
- Red Clay - directed by Branimir "Tori" Janković (1975)
- Naive Guy - directed by Jovan Živanović (1975)
- Beach Guard in Winter - directed by Goran Paskaljević (1976)
- The Peaks of Zelengora - directed by Zdravko Velimirović (1976)
- The Dog Who Loved Trains - directed by Goran Paskaljević (1977)
- Battle for the Railway - directed by Zdravko Velimirović (1978)
- Svetozar Markovic - directed by Eduard Galić (1980)
- Wide Leafs - directed by Peter Latinović (1981)
- Savamala - directed by Živorad Mitrović (1982)
- The Elusive Summer of '68 - directed by Goran Paskaljević (1984)
- Pervert - directed by Slobodan Jovanović (1994)
- A Man in an Empty Room - directed by Slobodan Jovanović (1994)
- Wounded Country - directed by Dragoslav Lazić (1999)

=== Phono records ===
- Adam and Eve, ballet, (electronic, Z.Hristić, S.Marković, Z.Janković) DISKOS LPD - 1019 STEREO
- Darinka's gift, ballet, orchestra of the Yugoslav Army, the female vocal group, A.Šurev, conductor, PGPRTB LP 2583 STEREO,
- Eight centuries of Chilandar The Cross Force, PGPRTS CD 430 572
- Legacy (Bequest) Ž. Grujić, cow horn, V. Savić, viola, orchestra of Radio Belgrade, Alkis Baltas, conductor, New Sound CD112, SOKOJ MIC

== Literature ==
- Baronijan Vartkes: Music and theatre, Zvuk/Sound, I, 1979.
- Bebler, Neda: The notion of musical sound, thesis, Belgrade, 1971.
- Bosnić, A: New ballet work Darinka gift of Hristić and Bozovic, Politika, 08.04.1974.
- Damjanović, Milan: Art as an experiment, Treći program, Spring, 1969.
- Despić, Dejan, two pillars of the new Kosovo, Zvuk/Sound, II, 1989.
- Detoni, D.: Panopticum Musicum, Selected Writings, Zagreb, Riječ i glazba, 1981.
- Dujmić, Dunja, Communication of meta-theater, Zvuk/Sound, I, 1975.
- Đuric-Klein, Stana: Evening of national ballet, Politika, 11 10.1974.
- Gojer Gradimir: Visual expression of a ballet, Ослобођење, 09.04.1981.
- Gostuški Dragutin: Bemus has started, НИН, 13.10.1974.
- Gostuški Dragutin: Dance in the face of death, НИН, 12. 04. 1981.
- Gostuški Dragutin: Umetnost u nedostatku dokaza/The art in the lack of evidence, Belgrade, Serbian literary union, 1977.
- Grlić, Janko: Radio and contemporary music, Zvuk/Sound, 73, 1967.
- Hristić, Zoran : Working on Darinka’s gift, Политика, 01. 10. 1974.
- Hristić, Zoran: Stage music and direction, Zvuk/Sound, II, 1985.
- Hristić, Zoran: Notes on creation of Darinka’s gift, Belgrade, 15.10. 1977. (handwriting)
- Kabiljo, Vesna: Electronic music in Serbia, Zvuk/Sound II, 1983.
- Kelemen, Milko: Labyrinth of sounds, Zvuk/Sound I – II - III 1980.
- Kelemen, Milko: Music scene, opera and multimedia opera, Zvuk/Sound, 120,1971.
- Kovač, Marija: Music and its clones – BITEF ’90, Zvuk/Sound, V, 1990.
- Kršić Bogdan: Graphics and theater, Politika, 17.11.1990.
- Luck, Rudolpg: New sounds on new instruments, Zvuk/Sound, 91, 1969.
- Peričić Vlastimir: Muzički stvaraoci u Srbiji/Music creators in Serbia, Belgrade, Prosveta, 1969.
- Radovanović, Vladan: Between electronics and music theatre, Treći program, Spring, 1981.
- Skovran, Dušan: Sound and image, Zvuk/Sound, 56, 1963.
- Trišić, Ivana: Elements of music theatre or theatralization of the music, Treći program, Spring, 1979.
- Veselinović, Mirjana: Novelties in Serbian music of the 70ties, Zvuk/Sound, IV, 1983.
- Veselinović, Mirjana: Creative presence of European avantgarde in Serbia, Belgrade, University of Arts
