= Rahela Ferari =

Serbian actress

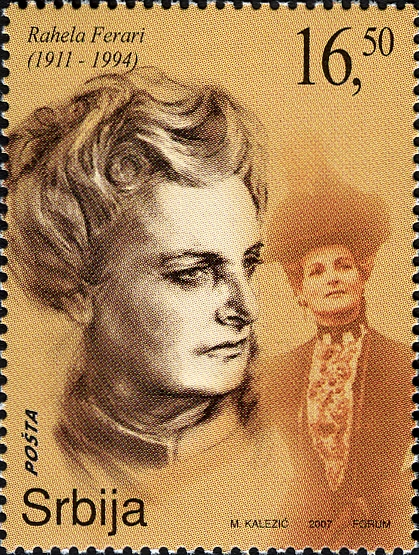
- Born: 27 August 1911; Zemun, Austria-Hungary
- Died: 12 February 1994 (aged 82); Belgrade, Serbia, FR Yugoslavia
- Occupation: Actor
- Years active: 1951–1993

Beela Rochel Freund (Serbian Cyrillic: Бела Рохел Фрojнд; 27 August 1911 – 12 February 1994), known as Rahela Ferari (Serbian Cyrillic: Рахела Ферари), was a Serbian actress who appeared in more than ninety films from 1951 to 1993. She was of Ashkenazi (Jewish) origin.

== Selected filmography ==
Year	Title	Role	Notes
1987	The Harms Case		
1984	Strangler vs. Strangler	Pera's mother	
1982	A Tight Spot	Mita's mother	
1978	The Tiger	Gospođa Hadžirakić	
1967	I Even Met Happy Gypsies	Igumanija	
1960	The Fourteenth Day	Sofija	
1953	Perfidy	Mare	
