= Vladimir Pogačić =

Yugoslav film director

- Born: 23 September 1919; Karlovac, Kingdom of Yugoslavia
- Died: 13 September 1999 (aged 79); Belgrade, Serbia
- Occupations: Director, screenwriter
- Years active: 1949–1963

Vladimir Pogačić (23 September 1919 – 13 September 1999) was a Yugoslav film director.

== Education ==
Before World War II, Pogačić studied art history at the University of Zagreb Faculty of Humanities and Social Sciences. In the late 1940s he enrolled at the Belgrade Film School.

Between 1945 and 1947 he worked as a screenwriter and director at Radio Zagreb (present-day Croatian Radio) and as a director at the Zagreb student theatre, where he directed a local production of Señora Carrar's Rifles in 1947, the first-ever work by Bertolt Brecht staged in Yugoslavia).

== Filmmaking career ==
Pogačić's filmmaking career began in 1949 with The Factory Story (Serbo-Croat: Priča o fabrici), after which he went on to become one of the most prolific Yugoslav film authors of the 1950s. He directed several landmark films of Yugoslav cinema: The Last Day (Poslednji dan, 1951), which is considered the first Yugoslav spy film; Legends of Anika (Anikina vremena, 1954), a film based on Ivo Andrić's story, which was the first Yugoslav film distributed in the United States, and Big and Small (Veliki i mali, 1956), which was the first Yugoslav feature film to win an international prize, as it won Pogačić the Best Director award at the 1957 Karlovy Vary International Film Festival. In addition, his 1953 film Perfidy was screened at the 1953 Cannes Film Festival in the international competition program.

From 1954 to 1981, Pogačić was the director of the Yugoslav Film Archive. He also served as president of the International Federation of Film Archives (FIAF) and vice-president of the International Council for Film Television and Audiovisual Communication (IFTC), the film division of UNESCO, from 1972 to 1979. Pogačić later worked as a lecturer at the University of Belgrade Faculty of Drama Arts and was editor of the influential Yugoslav film magazine Film danas (English: Film Today).

== Filmography ==
- The Factory Story (Priča o fabrici, 1949)
- The Last Day (Poslednji dan, 1951)
- Perfidy (Nevjera, 1953; based on a play by Ivo Vojnović)
- Legends of Anika (Anikina vremena, 1954; based on a story by Ivo Andrić)
- Big and Small (Veliki i mali, 1956)
- Saturday Night (Subotom uveče, 1957)
- Alone (Sam, 1959)
- Heaven Without Love (Pukotina raja, 1959)
- Carolina (Karolina Riječka, 1961; based on a comedy play by Drago Gervais)
- The Man in the Photograph (Čovjek s fotografije, 1963)
