= Pavle Vuisić =

Serbian actor and Yugoslav actor

- Павле Вуисић
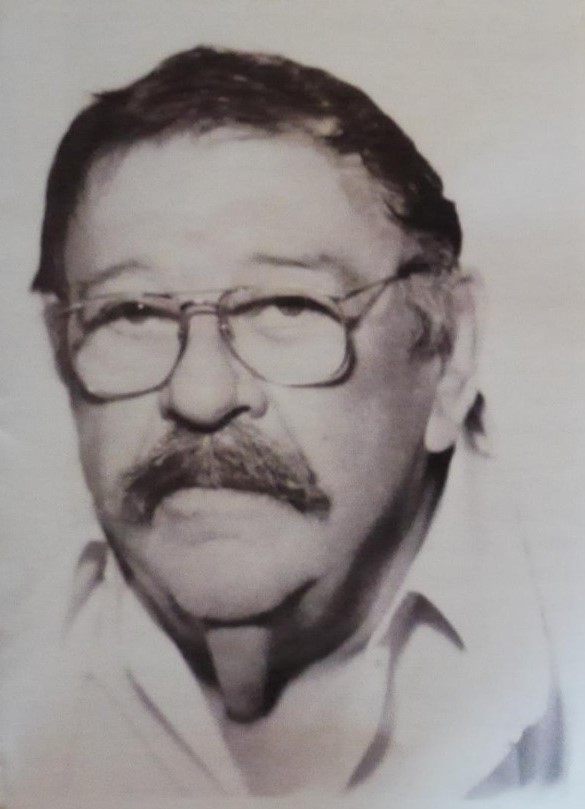
- Born: Pavle Vujisić; 10 July 1926; Cetinje, Kingdom of Serbs, Croats and Slovenes (modern-day Montenegro)
- Died: 1 October 1988 (aged 62); Belgrade, SR Serbia, SFR Yugoslavia
- Other name: Paja
- Occupation: Actor
- Years active: 1950–1986

Pavle "Paja" Vuisić (Serbian Cyrillic: Павле "Паја" Вуисић; 10 July 1926 – 1 October 1988) was a Serbian and Yugoslav actor who is known as one of the most recognisable faces of former Yugoslav cinema.

== Biography ==
He was born in Cetinje as Pavle Vujisić; his father was Mišo, a police officer, and his mother was Radmila. He was named after his grandfather Pavle, a Montenegrin jurist and brigadier. His great-grandfather was Milosav Mišnin Vujisić, a famous hero from Donja Morača and commander of the guard of Prince Danilo. He joined the Yugoslav Partisans and fought at the Syrmian Front. He studied law and literature and worked as a journalist for Radio Belgrade before he got a minor role in 1950 film Čudotvorni mač. After that he tried to become a professional actor, but failed to complete his enrollment at the Drama Arts Academy in Belgrade.

His first major role was in 1955 film Šolaja. He was never a star, but he quickly established himself as one of the most dependable and versatile character actors. In his long and prolific career, he played many different roles, both dramatic and comical, and earned great respect from almost any director with whom he worked. He is arguably best known for his role in 1972 TV series Kamiondžije (Truck Drivers), where he was paired with the comedian Miodrag Petrović Čkalja.

One of the acting awards in Serbia for lifetime acting achievement in movies, which is awarded at film festival in Niš, is named after him.

Orson Welles said in an interview for the former Yugoslav television RTZ that he considered Vuisić as the best actor in the world.

His legacy is housed by Adligat.

== Selected filmography ==
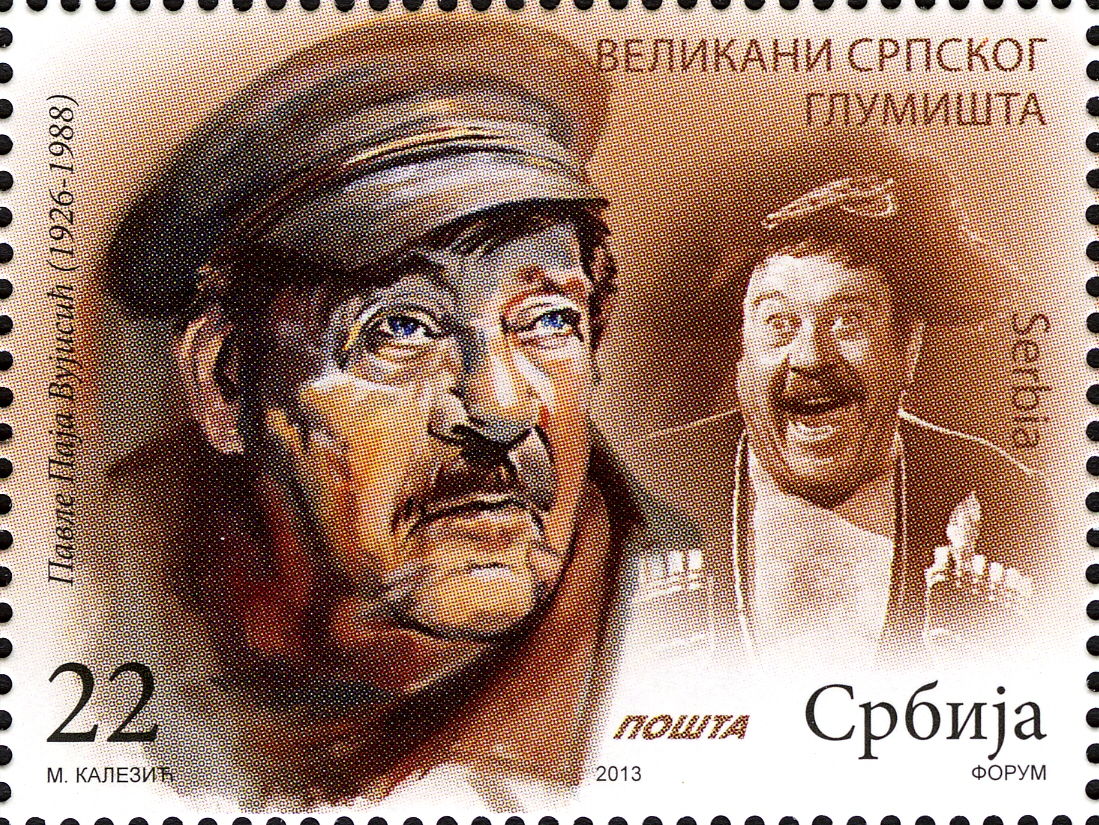
Pavle Vuisić on 2013 Serbian stamp

- The Magic Sword (1950) - Vitez
- Perfidy (1953) - Mornar
- The Gypsy Girl (1953) - Guta
- Point 905 (1960) - Pajo Šerpa
- The Steppe (1962) - Kuzmiciov
- Double Circle (1963) - Krčmar Marko
- Svanuće (1964) - Ilija
- Prometheus of the Island (1964) - Šjor Žane
- To Come and Stay (1965) - Mileta
- Monday or Tuesday (1966) - Markov otac
- The Rats Woke Up (1967) - Krmanoš
- Bomb at 10:10 (1967) - Man with the glasses
- Macedonian Blood Wedding (1967) - Pop Damjan
- When You Hear the Bells (1969) - Gara
- An Event (1969) - Đed Jura
- Battle of Neretva (1969) - Šofer
- Black Seed (1971) - Maki
- Walter Defends Sarajevo (1972) - Otpravnik vozova
- Traces of a Black Haired Girl (1972) - Paja
- The Master and Margaret (1972) - Azazelo
- Razmeđa (1973) - Pajo
- Death and the Dervish (1974) - Muftija
- Hell River (1974) - (uncredited)
- Doktor Mladen (1975) - Radovan Tadić
- Anno Domini 1573 (1975) - Franjo Tahy
- Beach Guard in Winter (1976) - Buda
- The Dog Who Loved Trains (1977) - Stric
- Ward Six (1978) - Čuvar Nikita
- Moment (1978) - Ljuba Kvrga
- The Tiger (1978) - Sorgin tener
- Across the Blue Sea (1979) - Šjor Frane
- Special Treatment (1980) - Direktorov otac
- Petria's Wreath (1980) - Ljubiša
- Who's Singin' Over There? (1980) - kondukter Krstić
- Majstori, majstori (1980) - Stole
- Do You Remember Dolly Bell? (1981) - Tetak
- The Marathon Family (1982) - Milutin Topalović
- The Smell of Quinces (1982) - Jozo
- Twilight Time (1982) - Paško
- Medeni mjesec (1983) - Drug Laza
- Early Snow in Munich (1984) - Otac
- When Father Was Away on Business (1985) - Dedo Muzamer
- Life Is Beautiful (1985) - Kruščić, gazda kafane
