= Adligat =

Serbian civil society organization, running a library and museums

- Адлигат
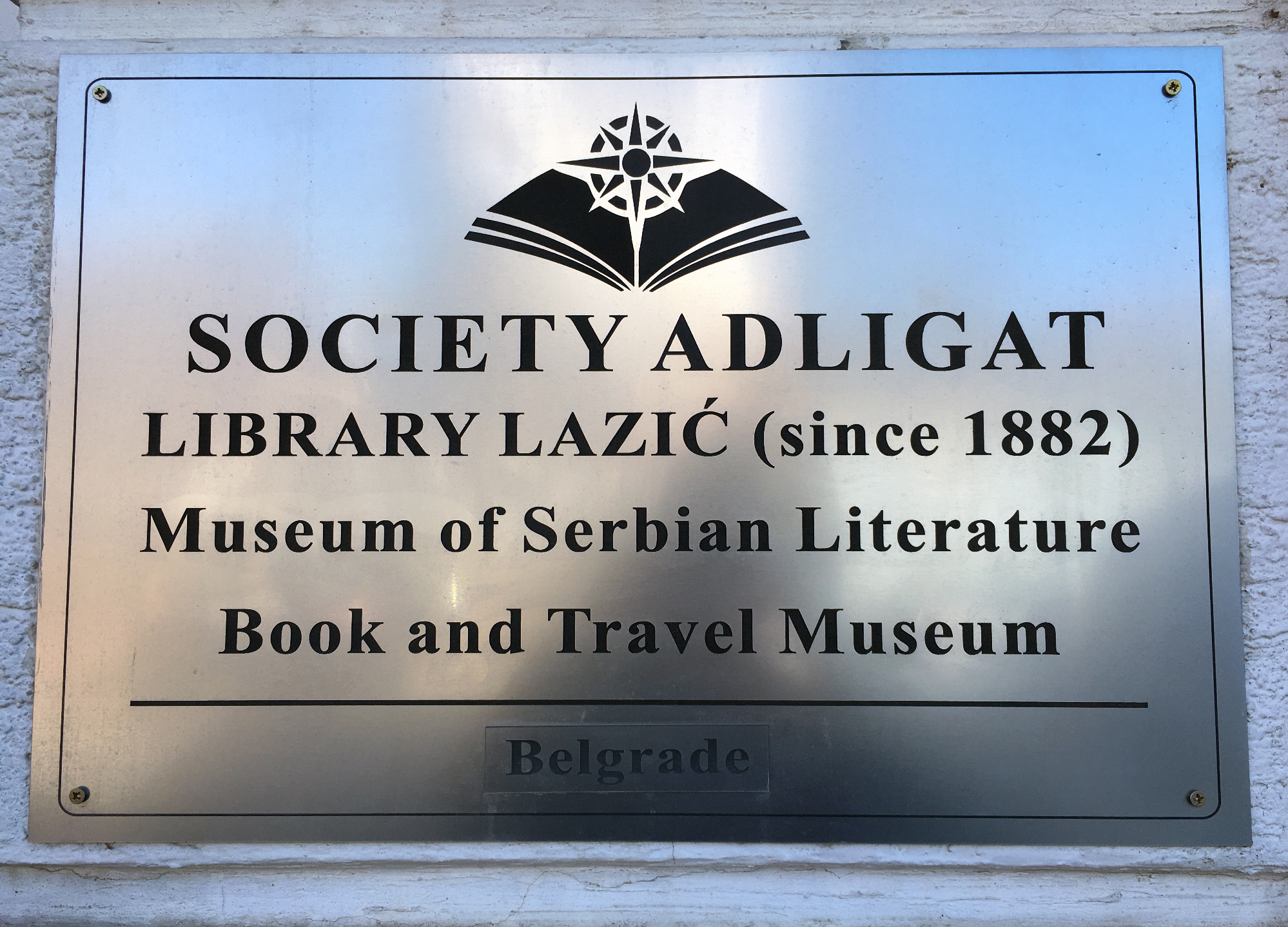
- Location: Belgrade, Banjica, Serbia
- Director: Viktor Lazić
- Website: www.adligat.rs

Adligat is a civil society organization which operates in the area of culture, arts and furthering the international cooperation of Serbia and the rest of the world. Based in Belgrade, It operates one of the largest privately owned libraries in the Balkans with more than 1 million titles, as well as the Museum of Book and Travel and the Museum of Serbian literature.

== History ==
The core of the organization is the personal library of Lazić family, which was founded in 1882 in Vojvodina. The Lazić library and the whole Adligat are run by the writer and world traveller Viktor Lazić who is the ninth generation of the family to manage the library as well as the board of the organization.

A number of academics and scholars are part of Adligat, including Vladeta Jerotić, Miodrag Pavlović, Filip David, Ljubivoje Ršumović, Ljubomir Simović, Emir Kusturica, Milovan Danojlić, Matija Bećković and others.

The two museum hold a number of valuable artefacts, including the letters of Thomas Edison, Nikola Tesla, personal belongings of Serbian kings, the actor Pavle Vuisić, writer Miloš Crnjanski, Nobel Prize winner Ivo Andrić, voivode Živojin Mišić, poet Vojislav Ilić, painter Uroš Predić, more than 120.000 stamps, 3000 coins and banknotes, a vast collection of rare books and numerous other possessions.

== Gallery ==
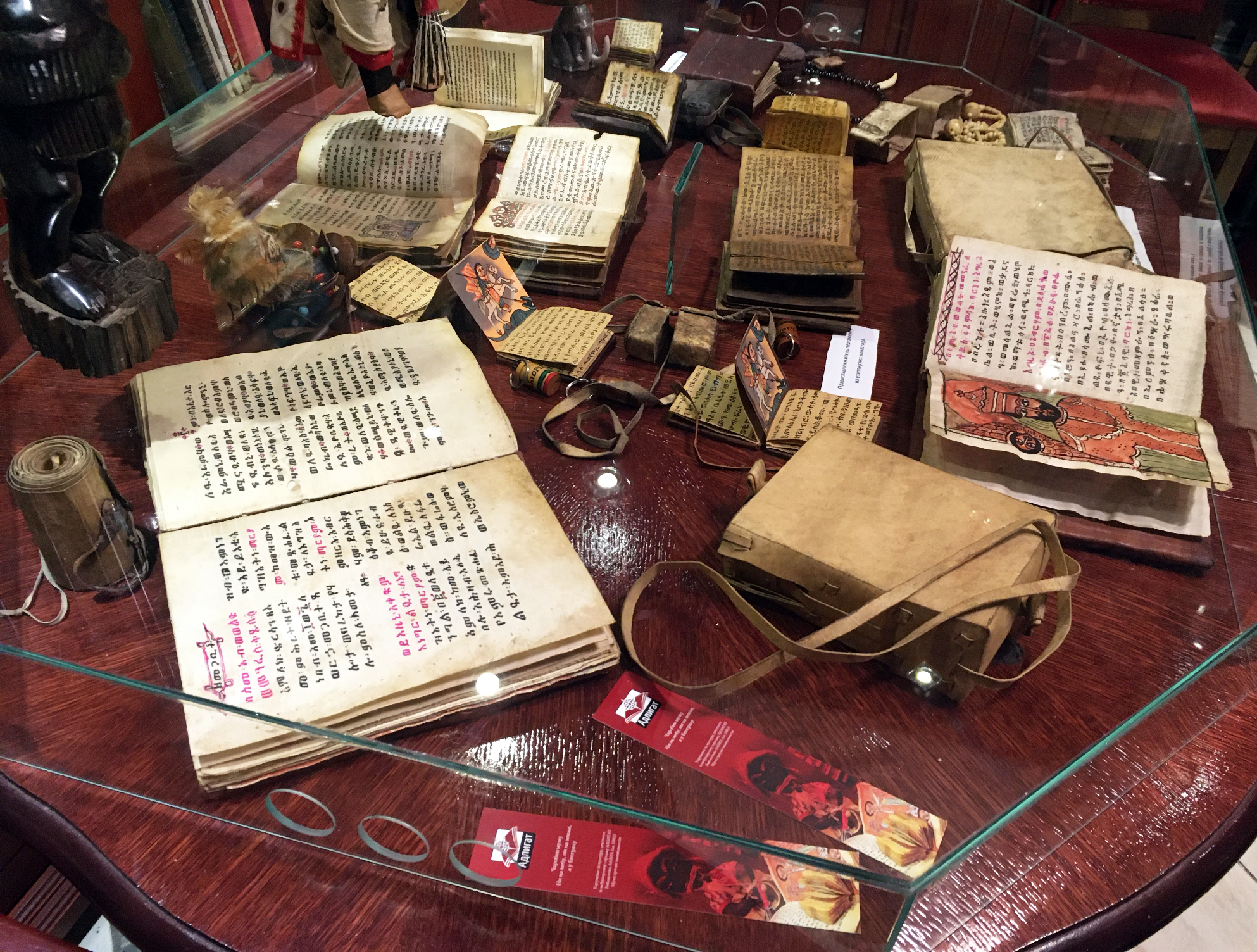
A collection of medieval Ethiopian books, Adligat, Belgrade

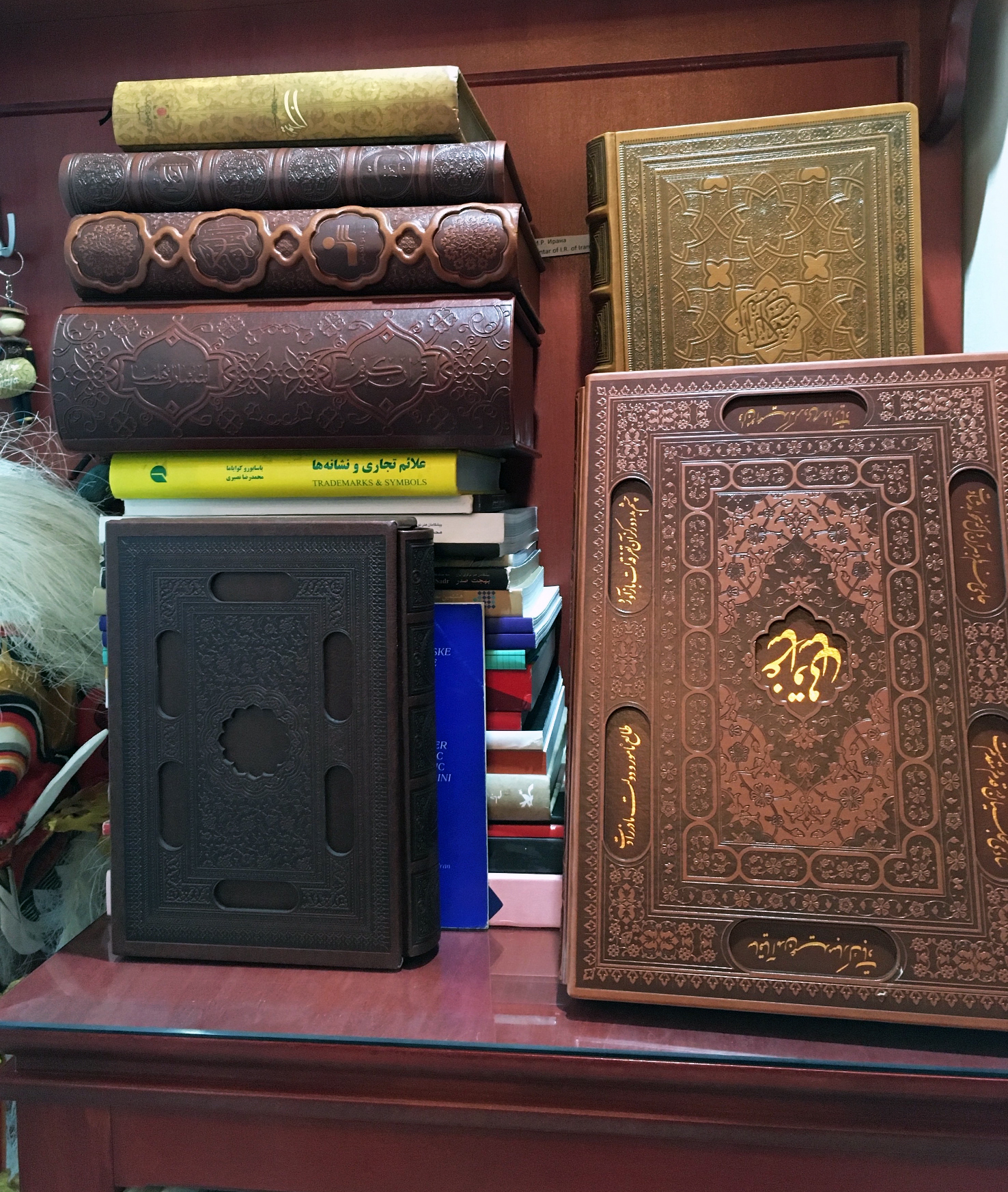
A collection of luxurious Qurans and other holy books

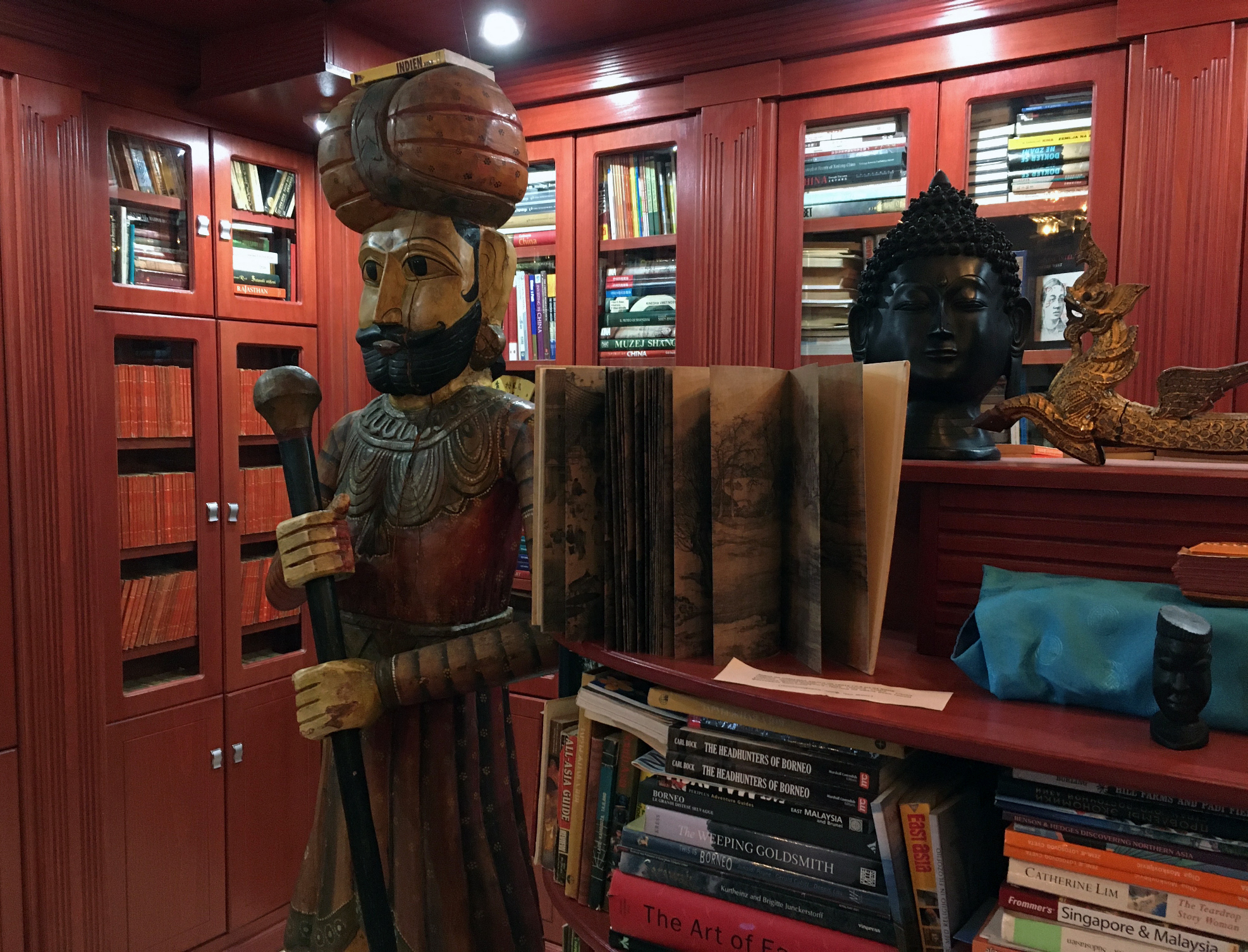
Various books and artifacts

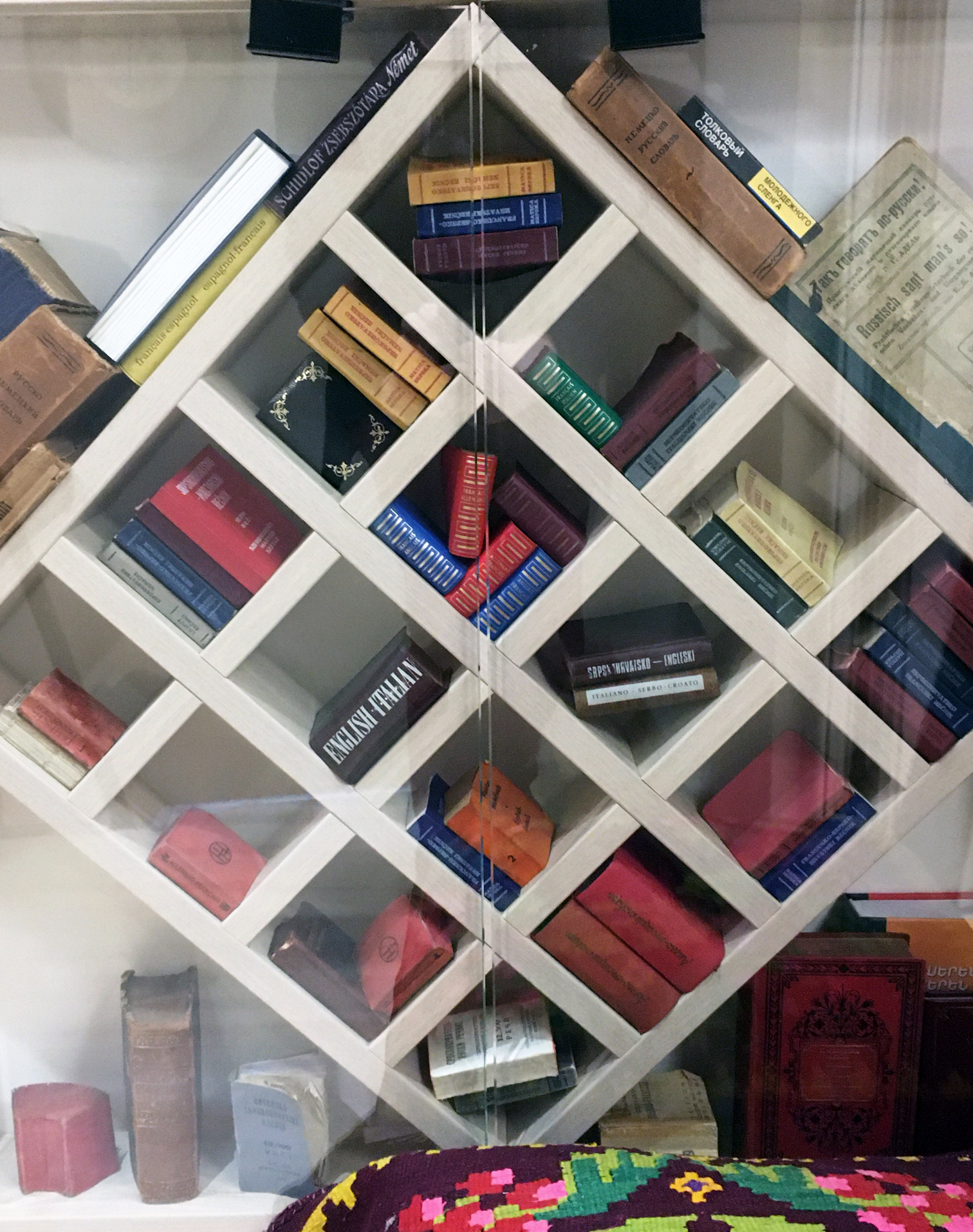
A collection of miniature books

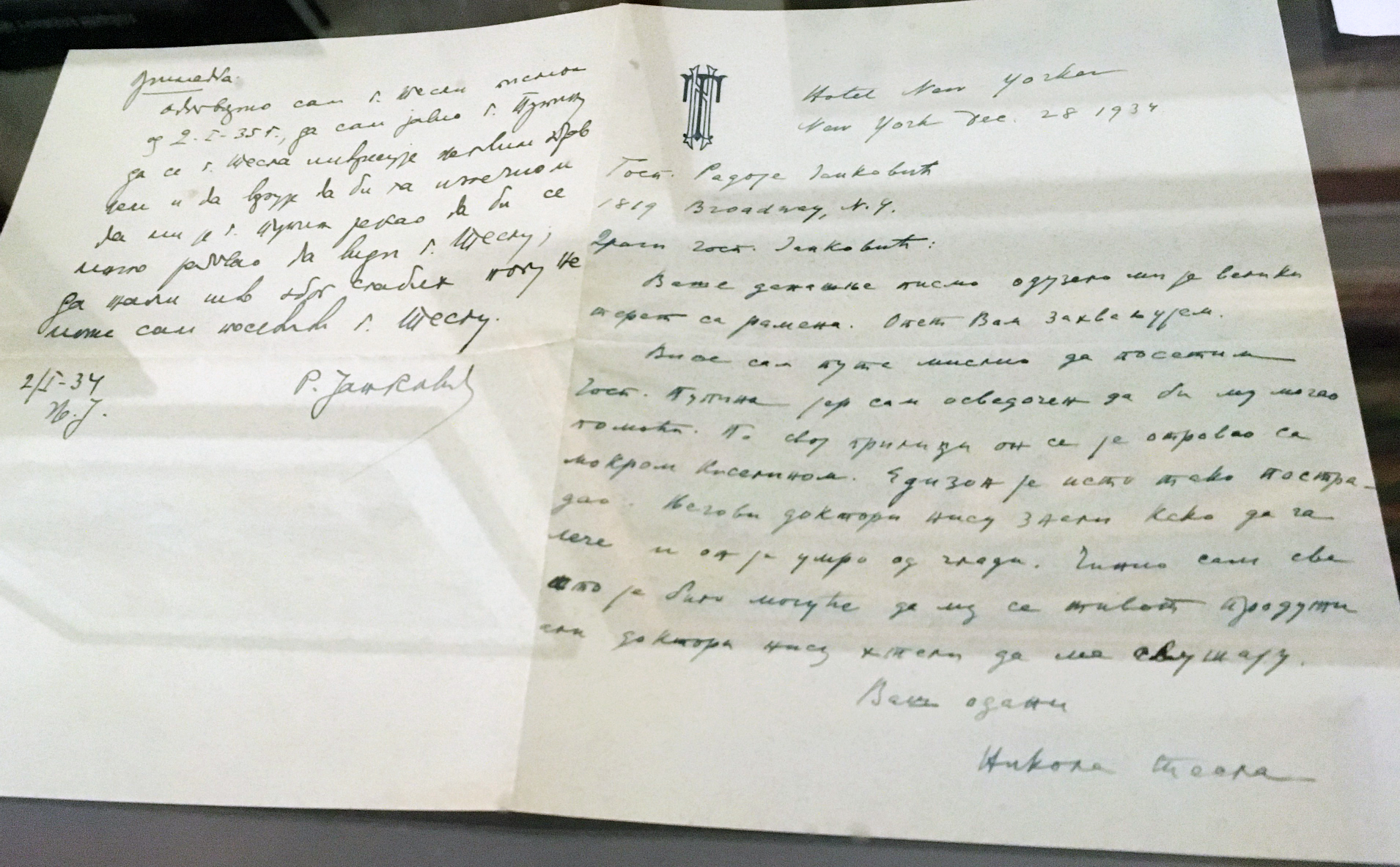
A letter by Nikola Tesla
