= Petria's Wreath =

- Movie poster.
- Directed by: Srđan Karanović
- Written by: Rajko Grlić; Srđan Karanović; Dragoslav Mihailović (Novel)
- Produced by: Milan Žmukić
- Starring: Mirjana Karanović; Dragan Maksimović; Pavle Vuisić; Marko Nikolić; Olivera Marković; Veljko Mandić; Ljiljana Krstić; Milivoje Tomić
- Cinematography: Tomislav Pinter
- Edited by: Branka Čeperac
- Music by: Zoran Simjanović
- Release date: 1980
- Running time: 99 minutes
- Country: Yugoslavia
- Language: Serbo-Croatian (Kosovo-Resava dialect)

Petria's Wreath (Serbo-Croatian: Петријин венац, Petrijin venac), is a 1980 Yugoslav film directed by Srđan Karanović based on the eponymous novel by Dragoslav Mihailović. It won the Big Golden Arena for Best Film, with Mirjana Karanović picking up the Golden Arena for Best Actress at the 1980 Pula Film Festival. Set in a small mining town in Serbia, before, during and after World War II, it follows the life of an illiterate woman. The film marks the acting debut of Mirjana Karanović.
