= The Harms Case =

1987 film

- Directed by: Slobodan D. Pešic
- Written by: Aleksandar Ćirić; Branislav Crnčević; Jovan Marković; Slobodan D. Pešic
- Produced by: Slobodan Stojičić-Lesi
- Starring: Mladen Andrejević
- Cinematography: Milos Spasojević
- Edited by: Neva Paskulović-Habić
- Release date: 1987
- Running time: 93 minutes
- Country: Yugoslavia
- Language: Serbo-Croatian

The Harms Case (Serbian: Slučaj Harms) is a 1987 Yugoslavian drama film directed by Slobodan D. Pešic. It was screened in the Un Certain Regard section at the 1988 Cannes Film Festival.

== Cast ==
- Mladen Andrejević - Zaboločki
- Abdula Azinović - Pijanac (II)
- Miroslav Bukovčić - Oficir koji puca
- Branko Cvejić - Marija Vasilijevna
- Ivana Despotović - Ida Markovna (II)
- Ljubomir Didić - Arhivar
- Ljubomir Draškić - Sveštenik
- Rahela Ferari - Stara dama
- Erol Kadić - Pijanac (I)
- Milutin Karadžić - Invalid instructor
- Vojislav Kostić - Majstor
- Aleksandar Kothaj - Crnoberzijanac
- Violeta Kroker - Ida Markovna (I)
- Predrag Laković - Harmonikaš
- Frano Lasić - Danil Harms
- Damjana Luthar - Anđeo
- Dubravka Marković - Oficir anđeo
- Ivana Marković - žena Feđe Davidovića
- Zoran Miljković - Inspektor KGB
- Željko Nikolić - Feđa Davidović
- Bogoljub Petrović - KGB agent
- Ljubo Škiljević - KGB agent (II)
- Dijana Sporčić - Žena policajac
- Milica Tomić - Irina Mazer
- Milivoje Tomić - Kino operator
- Eugen Verber - Pisar
- Olivera Viktorovic - Žena u kafani
- Francisko Žegarac - Danil Harms, dete
- Branislav Zeremski - Malograđanin
- Stevo Žigon - Professor
