= Gordan Mihić =

Serbian playwright (1938–2019)

- Born: 19 September 1938; Mostar, Kingdom of Yugoslavia (now Bosnia and Herzegovina)
- Died: 11 August 2019 (aged 80); Belgrade, Serbia
- Occupation: playwright
- Spouse: Vera Čukić

Gordan Mihić (Serbian Cyrillic: Гордан Михић; 19 September 1938 – 11 August 2019) was a Serbian playwright best known for his work on movie scripts for Black Cat, White Cat, Time of the Gypsies, Balkan Express and for the TV series Otvorena vrata and Kamiondžije.

He was married to actress Vera Čukić with whom he had a daughter, Ivana Mihić, also an actress. In 2021 Mihić was awarded Medal for Merits by the Republic of Serbia.

== Filmography ==
Year	Film	Notes
1962.	Zvižduk u osam	
1965.	Doći i ostati	
1966.	Vreme ljubavi	
1966.	Tople godine	
1967.	Kad budem mrtav i beo	
1967.	Vrlo stara priča	
1967.	Buđenje pacova	
1968.	Kaputi	
1968.	Tišina	
1968.	Prava adresa	
1968.	Raspust	
1968.	Greška evolucije	
1968.	Sirota Marija	
1969.	Samci 2	
1969.	Gospodin foka	
1969.	Vrane	
1971.	Bubašinter	
1971.	S vanglom u svet	
1972.	I Bog stvori kafansku pevačicu	
1972.	Kamiondžije	
1973.	Paja i Jare	
1973.	Žuta	
1973.	Siroti mali hrčki	
1973.	Junak mog detinjstva	
1974.	Njurci	
1974.	Protiv Kinga	
1974.	Jastuk	
1974.	Trkač	
1974.	Draga tetka	
1974.	Mićko	
1974.	Poštenje	
1975.	Đavolje merdevine	
1975.	Prijatelji	
1975.	Mili	
1976.	Čuvar plaže u zimskom periodu	
1976.	Sve što je bilo lepo	
1976.	Povratak otpisanih	
1977.	Leptirov oblak	
1977.	Pas koji je voleo vozove	
1977.	Mala noćna muzika	
1978.	Tigar	
1978.	Sva čuda sveta	
1979.	Nacionalna klasa	script collaborator
1979.	Osvajanje slobode	
1979.	Kost od mamuta	
1979.	Srećna porodica	
1980.	Došlo doba da se ljubav proba	script collaborator
1981.	500 kada	
1982.	Sablazan	
1982.	Kante ili kese	
1983.	Uvoz—izvoz	
1983.	Balkan ekspres	
1984.	Kraj rata	
1984.	Jaguarov skok	
1984.	Kamiondžije 2	
1984.	Varljivo leto '68	
1984.	Varljivo leto ’68 (TV serija)	
1984.	Kamiondžije opet voze	
1986.	Sivi dom	
1986.	Srećna nova ’49.	
1986.	Boško miš i Boško čovek	
1986.	Smešne i druge priče	
1986.	Nestaško	
1987.	Vrata doma	
1988.	Balkan ekspres 2	
1988.	Dom za vešanje	
1988.	Zaboravljeni	
1989.	Balkan ekspres 2 (serija)	
1989.	Dom za vešanje (mini serija)	
1990.	Zaboravljeni	
1990.	Početni udarac	
1992.	Tango argentino	
1994.	Dnevnik uvreda 1993.	
1995.	Otvorena vrata	
1995.	Terasa na krovu	
1995.	Tuđa Amerika	
1996–1997.	Gore dole	
1997.	Tri letnja dana	
1998.	Kupi mi Eliota	
1998.	Crna mačka beli mačor	
1999.	Ranjena zemlja	
2000.	Mehanizam	
2001.	Ona voli Zvezdu	
2003.	Kuća sreće	
2003.	Siroti mali hrčki 2010	
2003.	Kapija za nebo	
2005.	Kontakt	
2008.	Absurdistan	
2011.	Beli lavovi	story writer
2011–2012	Vojna akademija	
2014.	Deca sunca	story writer
2015.	Bićemo prvaci sveta	script collaborator
2016.	Prvaci sveta	script collaborator
2018.	Nemanjić Dynasty: The Birth Of The Kingdom	
2018.	On the Milky Road	script collaborator
2020.	Vozi, kume	
2020.	Zlatni dani	
//.	Rajko Mitić	pre-production
