= Irfan Mensur =

Serbian theatre, television and film actor

- Ирфан Менсур
- Born: Irfan Kurić; 19 January 1952 (age 74); Sarajevo, PR Bosnia and Herzegovina, FPR Yugoslavia
- Occupation: Actor
- Years active: 1973–present
- Spouses: Ljiljana Perović (m. 1976; div. 1984) Srna Lango (m. 1995; div. 2012)
- Children: 2

Irfan Mensur (Serbian Cyrillic: Ирфан Менсур; born Irfan Kurić, Serbian Cyrillic: Ирфан Курић; 19 January 1952) is a Serbian theatre, television, and film actor of Bosnian descent.

== Early life ==
Born to father Mensur Kurić from Niš whose family traces its origins to Donji Vakuf in Bosnia and Herzegovina and Sarajevo-born mother Nada Wasche of Czech and Hungarian descent, Irfan grew up in Sarajevo's Dolac Malta neighbourhood. His childhood pursuits in Sarajevo generally revolved around sports. At the age of 15, as a result of his parents divorcing, young Irfan moved with his father to Niš.

In Niš, Irfan's father married the actress Miroslava "Mima" Vuković, so adolescent Irfan spent part of his teenage years living with a stepmother.

Encouraged by his stage actress stepmother, young Irfan began pursuing performing arts after, by own admission, setting foot inside a theater for the first time at age 16. Within a few years, he successfully passed the entrance audition at the Academy of Theatre, Film, Radio and Television in Belgrade where he began studying under professor Minja Dedić's tutelage. As a way of honouring his father, soon after moving to Belgrade, the aspiring actor legally changed his last name to Mensur.

== Cinematic career ==
After appearing in several supporting roles in different Yugoslav TV movies and series, in 1975, twenty-two-year-old Mensur landed the role of Gavrilo Princip in a high-budget Yugoslav-Czechoslovak-West German co-production, The Day That Shook the World. Directed by Veljko Bulajić and featuring a prominent cast headed by globally-known actors Christopher Plummer, Florinda Bolkan, and Maximilian Schell, the film about the 1914 assassination of the Austro-Hungarian archduke Franz Ferdinand in Sarajevo was an ambitious and generously funded project that ended up securing a theatrical release in a number of countries. However, it was met with lukewarm reviews and limited box office success. For his part, in later interviews, Mensur talked about being extremely dissatisfied with his own performance in the high-profile movie that "marked me in the Yugoslav public consciousness to the point of forcing me to have to go around convincing different film and TV people [in Yugoslavia] that I'm actually not a bad actor".

== Selected filmography ==
=== Film ===
Year	Title	Role	Notes
1975	The Day That Shook the World	Gavrilo Princip	
1976	Beach Guard in Winter	Dragan Pasanovic	
1977	The Dog Who Loved Trains	Mladic	
1982	The Smell of Quinces	Ibrahim	
1982	A Tight Spot	Profesor 'Japanac'	
1989	Battle of Kosovo	Makarije	
1999	Sky Hook	Zuka	

== Personal life ==
In 1976, at the height of his Beach Guard in Winter popularity in Yugoslavia, twenty-four-year-old Mensur married the twenty-three-year-old Trebinje-born model Ljiljana Perović who had, much like him, also spent her childhood in Sarajevo before ending up in Belgrade in pursuit of a show business career. The couple had a son, Filip, in 1983 before divorcing in 1984.

In 1995, Mensur married the actress Srna Lango who, like Mensur, already had a son from a previous marriage. Their son Pavle was born in 1999. In December 2010, Irfan and Srna appeared as contestants in popular reality show Parovi on the Serbian TV station Happy TV. The couple divorced in 2012.

In April 2013, sixty-one-year-old Mensur suffered a heart attack while preparing a play at the Zoran Radmilović Theater in Zaječar. He was immediately rushed to a cardiovascular clinic in Belgrade where a triple bypass surgery was performed.
