= Kamiondžije =

Yugoslav 1973 television series

- Genre: Comedy
- Created by: Gordan Mihić
- Directed by: Milo Đukanović
- Starring: Miodrag Petrović Čkalja; Pavle Vuisić; Slavka Jerinić; Borivoje Jovanović; Radmila Savićević
- Country of origin: Yugoslavia
- No. of episodes: 10

Production
- Running time: 52 minutes
- Production company: RTB

Original release
- Network: RTS1
- Release: 7 January – 18 March 1973

Kamiondžije (Serbo-Croatian Cyrillic: Камионџије, lit. 'Truckers') is a 1973 Yugoslav comedy television series. It follows the adventures of the truck drivers Paja and Jare, who attempt, with little success, to start a business. The series's cult popularity in Yugoslavia caused several sequels to be produced: films in 1974 and 1984 and a further remake in 2020.
