= Živojin Pavlović =

Yugoslav and Serbian film director, writer, painter and professor

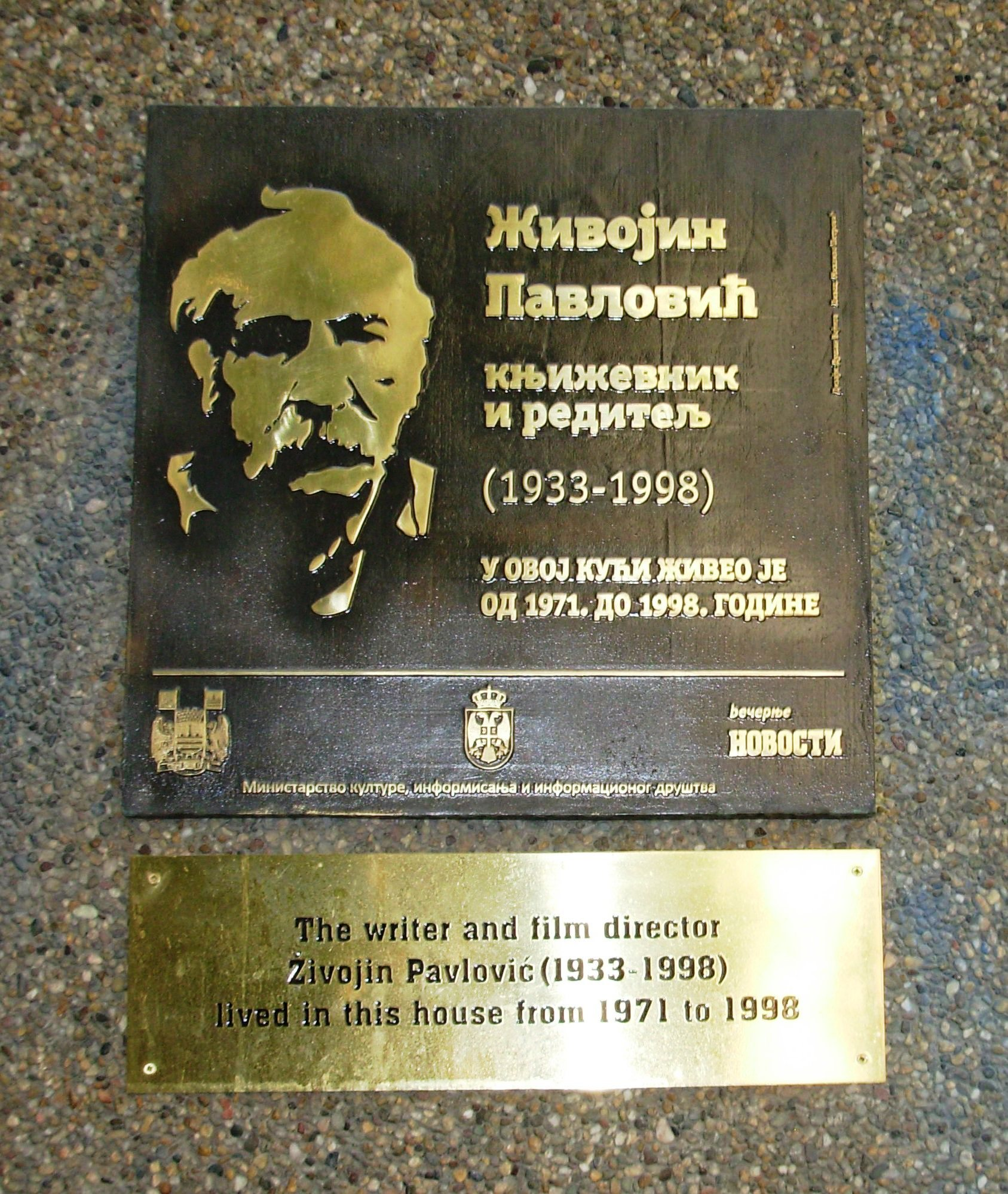
- A plaque on the house in which Pavlović lived and worked
- Born: 15 April 1933; Šabac, Kingdom of Yugoslavia
- Died: 29 November 1998 (aged 65); Belgrade, FR Yugoslavia
- Education: Academy of Applied Arts, University of Belgrade
- Occupations: film director, screenwriter, writer, university professor at Faculty of Dramatic arts
- Awards: NIN Award, Several Golden arenas at Pula Film Festival, Silver Bear for Directing

Živojin "Žika" Pavlović (15 April 1933 – 29 November 1998) was a Yugoslav and Serbian film director, writer, painter and professor. In his films and novels, Pavlović depicted the cruel reality of small, poor and abandoned people living in the corners of society. He was one of the major figures of the Black Wave in Yugoslav cinema in the 1960s, a movement which portrayed the darker side of life rather than the shiny facades of communist Yugoslavia.

== Biography ==
Pavlović was born in Šabac in 1933. When he was 19, he started writing about film and art for Belgrade newspapers. He graduated in painting at the Academy of Applied Arts, University of Belgrade, and directed his first professional film, Žive Vode (Living Water) in 1961. The film received a special jury award at the Pula Film Festival. He died in Belgrade.

Pavlović received numerous awards, including the Andrić Prize, two NIN Prizes for his novels, Isidora Sekulić Award, one Silver Bear of the Berlin International Film Festival and several Golden Arenas of the Yugoslavia's most prestigious Pula Film Festival.

== Filmography ==
Year	Film	Director	Writer	Awards / Notes
1960	Triptih o materiji i smrti (Triptich on the Matter and Death)	Yes	No	Golden Arena at Pula Film Festival
1961	Lavirint (Labyrinth)	Yes	No	Bronze Arena at Pula Film Festival, Golden Berlin Bear nominee
1962	Žive vode (part of Kapi, vode, ratnici)	Yes	Yes	omnibus
1963	Obruč (Encirclement; part of Grad)	Yes	Yes	omnibus
1965	Neprijatelj (The Enemy)	Yes	Yes	
1966	Povratak (The Return)	Yes	No	
1967	Kad budem mrtav i beo (When I Am Dead and Gone)	Yes	No	FIPRESCI Prize at Karlovy Vary International Film Festival, Golden Arena for best film at Pula Film Festival
1967	Buđenje pacova (The Rats Woke Up)	Yes	No	Golden Arena for Best Director at Pula Film Festival, Silver Bear for Directing in Berlin
1969	Zaseda (The Ambush)	Yes	Yes	CIDALC Award at Venice Film Festival
1970	Crveno klasje (Red Wheat)	Yes	No	Best Film and Best Director at the 1970 Pula Film Festival
1973	Let mrtve ptice (Flight of a Dead Bird)	Yes	No	
1975	Pesma (The Song), TV Series	Yes	Yes	TV series
1977	Hajka (Manhunt)	Yes	Yes	Best Film and director at the 1977 Pula Film Festival
1980	Nasvidenje v naslednji vojni (See You in the Next War)	Yes	Yes	
1983	Body Scent (Zadah tela)	Yes	Yes	Best Film, Director and Screenplay at the 1983 Pula Film Festival
1987	Na putu za Katangu (On the Road to Catanga)	Yes	No	
1992	Dezerter (The Deserter)	Yes	Yes	
2000	Država mrtvih (The State of Dead)	Yes	Yes	post-humous

== Bibliography ==
Short story collections

  - Krivudava reka (1963, 1994)
  - Dve večeri u jesen (1967)
  - Cigansko groblje (1972)
  - Ubijao sam bikove (1985, 1988)
  - Kriške vremena (1993)
  - Blato (1999)
  - Dnevnik nepoznatog (1965)
  - Vetar u suvoj travi (1976)
  - Krugovi (1993)
  - Belina sutra (1984)
  - Flogiston (1989)
  - Azbuka (1990)

Essays

  - Film u školskim klupama (1964)
  - Đavolji film (1969, 1996)
  - O odvratnom (1972, 1982)
  - Balkanski džez (1989)
  - Davne godine (1997)

Novels

  - Lutke; Lutke na bunjištu (1965, 1991)
  - Kain i Avelj (1969, 1986)
  - Zadah tela (1982, 1985, 1987, 1988, 1990)
  - Oni više ne postoje (1985, 1987)
  - Zid smrti (1985, 1986, 1987) (NIN Prize)
  - Lov na tigrove (1988)
  - Raslo mi je badem drvo (1988)
  - Vašar na Svetog Aranđela (1990)
  - Trag divljači (1991)
  - Lapot (1992) (NIN Prize)
  - Biljna krv (1995)
  - Simetrija (1996)
  - Dolap (1997)

Diaries

  - Ispljuvak pun krvi (1984 banned, 1990 reissued)
  - Otkucaji (1998)
  - Dnevnici I-VI (2000)
