= Perfidy (film) =

1953 film

- Directed by: Vladimir Pogačić
- Written by: Momčilo Ilić; Ivo Vojnović
- Starring: Marija Crnobori
- Cinematography: Jovan Jovanovic; Nikola Majdak
- Edited by: Milada Rajsic
- Release date: 3 March 1953
- Running time: 80 minutes
- Country: Yugoslavia
- Language: Serbo-Croatian

Perfidy (Serbo-Croatian: Nevjera) is a 1953 Yugoslavian drama film directed by Vladimir Pogačić. It was entered into the 1953 Cannes Film Festival.

== Cast ==
- Marija Crnobori - Jela Ledinic
- Milivoje Živanović - Niko Marinovic
- Viktor Starčić - Gospar Frano Drazic
- Severin Bijelić - Ivo Ledinic ... sin
- Milena Dapčević - Ane di Gracia
- Milan Ajvaz - Stari mornar
- Karlo Bulić - Kapetan broda
- Rahela Ferari - Mare
- Baro Kriletić
- Nevenka Mikulić
- Miša Mirković
- Zoran Ristanović
- Milutin Tatić
- Irina Viskovic
- Janez Vrhovec
- Pavle Vujisić - Mornar
- Čedomir Žarković
