= Severin Bijelić =

Serbian actor

- Born: 10 February 1921; Belgrade, Kingdom of Serbs, Croats and Slovenes
- Died: 28 July 1972 (aged 51); Vela Luka, SR Croatia, SFR Yugoslavia
- Occupations: Actor, footballer
- Years active: 1949–1972

Severin Bijelić (Serbian Cyrillic: Северин Бијелић; 10 February 1921 – 28 July 1972) was a Serbian actor. He appeared in 77 films and television shows between 1949 and 1972. He starred in the 1967 film The Rats Woke Up, which won the Silver Bear for Best Director at the 17th Berlin International Film Festival.

While he was young, he was also a football goalkeeper, having played in the Yugoslav First League with Belgrade side FK BASK. He was registered for BASK in February 1937 and played with BASK in the 1936–37 and 1938–39 making 10 league appearances. Before the start of the Second World War, he was the usual goalkeeper of the Yugoslav U-21 team, and in 1941 he moved to FK Obilić.

In 1940 he was the goalkeeper of the first two games ever of the Yugoslav youth team. Both games were against Romania, the first played in Bucharest on 31 March, a 2–0 win, and second in Belgrade on 22 September, a 4–1 win.

During World War II, Bijelić was sent to a labor camp in Bor with other detainees who were also professional footballers, such as Vladimir Pečenčić and Miodrag Savić from SK Jugoslavija and Laza Popović from BSK Belgrade. They formed a football team that played against local clubs.

After the liberation of Yugoslavia, Bijelić became part of the newly formed Red Star Belgrade playing with them in the 1945–46 season.

== Selected filmography ==
- Perfidy (1953)
- Legends of Anika (1953)
- Love and Fashion (1960)
- The Rats Woke Up (1967)
- I Even Met Happy Gypsies (1967)
