= Ljubomir Ćipranić =

Serbian actor

- Born: 9 April 1936; Stojakovo, Gevgelija, Vardar Banovina, Kingdom of Yugoslavia
- Died: 24 December 2010 (aged 74); Belgrade, Serbia
- Occupation: Actor
- Years active: 1959–2010

Ljubomir Ćipranić (9 April 1936 – 24 December 2010) was a Serbian actor. He appeared in over 160 films and television shows since 1959. He starred in the 1967 film The Rats Woke Up, which won the Silver Bear for Best Director at the 17th Berlin International Film Festival.

== Selected filmography ==
- The Rats Woke Up (1967)
- Tigar (1978)
- Migrations (1988)
