= To Come and Stay =

1965 Croatian film directed by Branko Bauer

To Come and Stay (Doći i ostati) is a 1965 Croatian film directed by Branko Bauer.

== See also ==
- Cinema of Croatia
- List of Croatian films
