= Vladan Živković =

Yugoslav actor (1941–2022)

Vladan Živković (15 December 1941 – 3 January 2022) was a Serbian actor, perhaps best known outside Yugoslavia for his work in Sam Peckinpah's Cross of Iron.

Vladan Živković was born on 15 December 1941 in Belgrade, Territory of the Military Commander in Serbia. In 2007, he was given The Ring with Figure of Joakim Vujić, an award of the Knjaževsko-srpski teatar, Kragujevac, Serbia. He died on 3 January 2022, at the age of 80.

== Partial filmography ==
- England Made Me (1973)
- Beach Guard in Winter (1976)
- Cross of Iron (1977)
- Special Education (1977)
- The Tiger (1978)
- A Tight Spot (1982)
- Balkan Spy (1984)
