= Potpisani =

- Created by: Marko Kovač
- Starring: Marko Kovač; Nikola Dakić; Nemanja Predojević; Milan Djukić; Saša Bajević; Dejan Spasojević
- Country of origin: Serbia
- No. of seasons: 2

Production
- Running time: 45 minutes

Original release
- Network: Art TV; TV Metropolis
- Release: January 25, 2009

Potpisani (Serbian Cyrillic: Потписани, English: The Undersigned) is a Serbian alternative TV serial and parody of Otpisani from 2007, 2008 and 2010 by MK Art Studio.

Like in the original TV series Otpisani, the subject of Potpisani is the underground partisan resistance in Belgrade during World War II.

In addition, the targets of this parody are many famous Hollywood movies like Star Wars, The Matrix, Superman III, Home Alone, Charlie Chaplin's and Bruce Lee's films, and also many of famous Serbian movies and TV shows, such as The Marathon Family, Balkan Spy, Nacionalna klasa, Vratice se rode etc.

Podbradak potpisanih (Serbian Cyrillic: Подбрадак потписаних, English: The Double Chin of the Undersigned) is a sequel of Potpisani which parodies the name of Povratak otpisanih, the sequel of Otpisani.

== List of episodes ==
- Potpisani (Undersigned)

Episode	Original name	Runtime	First airdate	Network
01. The Phone Exchange	Telefonska centrala	45 min.	January 25, 2009	Art TV
02. A Password	Šifra	45 min.	February 1, 2009	Art TV
03. The Train	Voz	53 min.	January 3, 2011	TV Metropolis
04. Paya Shish-kebab	Paja Šiškebab	45 min.	June 1, 2013	Art TV
05. Mobilization	Mobilizacija	59 min.	October 4, 2014	Art TV
06. The Camp	Logor	42 min.	October 22, 2016	Art TV
07. The Garage, the Revenge and Something Else	Garaža, osveta i još ponešto	75 min.	December 1, 2017	DOB
08. Treger	Treger	57 min.	April 7, 2019	DOB

- Podbradak potpisanih (Chin of Undersigned)

Episode	Original name	Runtime	First airdate	Network
01. Episode 1941.	Epizoda 1941.	20 min.	January 4, 2011	TV Metropolis
02. Episode 1942.	Epizoda 1942.	20 min.	October 27, 2012i	Art TV
03. Episode 1943.	Epizoda 1943.	24 min.	November 3, 2012	Art TV
04. Episode 1944.	Epizoda 1944.	23 min.	November 10, 2012	Art TV
05. Episode 1945.	Epizoda 1945.	26 min.	November 17, 2012	Art TV

== Main cast ==
This is a list of characters who have appeared in the Potpisani film serial.

Character	Films / Episodes								TV series
Character	The Phone Exchange (2007)	A Password (2008)	The Train (2010)	Paya Shish-kebab (2013)	Mobilization (2014)	The Camp (2016)	The Garage, the Revenge and Something Else (2017)	Treger (2019)	Podbradak potpisanih (2011)
Prele	Marko Kovač	Marko Kovač	Marko Kovač	Marko Kovač	Marko Kovač	Marko Kovač	Marko Kovač	Marko Kovač	Marko Kovač
Gluhi	Nikola Dakić	Nemanja Predojević	Goran Simić	Nemanja Predojević	Nemanja Predojević	Nemanja Predojević	Nemanja Predojević	Dejan Dimitrijević	Goran Simić
Suri	Dejan Spasojević	Dejan Spasojević	Photograph	Dejan Spasojević	Dejan Spasojević	Dejan Spasojević (Voice)	Dejan Spasojević		Bojan Aleksić
Treger	Milan Djukić	Milan Djukić	Milan Djukić	Milan Djukić	Milan Djukić	Milan Djukić (Voice)	Milan Djukić	Milan Djukić	Milan Djukić
Cane Pedala	Nikola Terić	Nikola Terić	Nikola Terić	Nikola Terić	Nikola Terić	Drawn			Nikola Terić
Chedo Chednik	Bude Budisavljević	Bude Budisavljević	Bude Budisavljević						Bude Budisavljević
Boca		Saša Bajević	Saša Bajević	Saša Bajević	Actor's Double & Photograph	Drawn			Saša Bajević
Brishkula (Briscola)		Ljubomir Štulović	Ljubomir Štulović		Ljubomir Štulović				Ljubomir Štulović
Zrikavac			Bojan Aleksić	Bojan Aleksić	Bojan Aleksić	Bojan Aleksić (Voice)	Bojan Aleksić		Bojan Aleksić
Paya Shish-kebab			Saša Bajević	Saša Bajević					Saša Bajević
Ado Majka (Fuhrer)			Nemanja Predojević		Nemanja Predojević			Dejan Dimitrijević	Nemanja Predojević
Vlada Chechen			Vladeta Aksentijević	Vladeta Aksentijević	Photograph	Drawn			Vladeta Aksentijević
Gojko Cinkar			Boško Babović						Boško Babović
Kotangens (Cotangent)				Bojan Aleksić	Bojan Aleksić				Bojan Aleksić
Shpira				Dušan Stokić					
Shtuca							Nebojša Stepanović	Nebojša Stepanović	
Steva Sajla							Slobodan Andrejevic		
Ivana Lola Riba-r									Ana Spasojević

== Public screenings, festivals and awards ==
- After screenings on several TV stations, "Potpisani" had own public cinema life in "Culture house of campus" in Belgrade June 18, 2010 in the „No budget“ festival.
- August 14, 2011 "Potpisani (episode 1)" won "Woody dwarf" at The First Festival of Independent off-films in Serbian Holywood.
- April 12, 2012 "Podbradak potpisanih" was shown on the big screen in "Culture house of campus" in Belgrade.
- July 29, 2012 "Potpisani (episode 3)" won "Woody dwarf" for the Third place at The Second Festival of Independent off-films in Serbian Holywood.
- March 16, 2013 "Potpisani (episode 4)" was shown on the big screen in "Dom omladine Beograda"
- August 4, 2013 "Potpisani (episode 4)" was shown on the big screen at The Third Festival of Independent off-films in Serbian Holywood.
