= Otpisani =

1974 Yugoslav TV series

- Promotional poster for the series
- Created by: Dragan Marković; Siniša Pavić
- Based on: Zabranjeni život (Beograd 1941–1944) by Dragan Marković
- Directed by: Aleksandar Đorđević
- Starring: Dragan Nikolić; Voja Brajović; Miki Manojlović; Stevo Žigon; Čedomir Petrović; Rudolf Ulrich
- Country of origin: SFR Yugoslavia
- No. of seasons: 1
- No. of episodes: 13

Production
- Running time: 55 minutes

Original release
- Network: TV Belgrade
- Release: December 22, 1974 – March 16, 1975

Otpisani (Serbian Cyrillic: Отписани, lit. 'The Written Offs') is a Yugoslav drama television series, produced by Radio Television Belgrade and first aired in 1974. The series follows the lives of young Partisans during the World War II in Yugoslavia in occupied Belgrade. It is based the book Zabranjeni život (Serbian for 'Forbidden Life') by Dragan Marković.

A film of the same title, which follows the plotline of the first two episodes, was also shot in 1974. Due to the series' popularity, a sequel titled Povratak otpisanih (English: The Return of the Written Offs) was released in 1978.

Due to its popularity, Radio Television of Serbia has shown reruns of the series eleven times. The series has a cult status among its audience in ex-Yugoslav countries and has attracted an estimated three million viewers with its last rerun. A digital remaster of the series premiered on RTS on 29 August 2024, on the series' 50th anniversary.

== Plot ==
Upon the news that Adolf Hitler has invaded the Soviet Union, a group of members of the League of Socialist Youth of Yugoslavia decide to form an illegal group to oppose the Wehrmacht. Their actions put them at on a blacklist of the Gestapo-run Belgrade Special Police.

== Cast ==
- Dragan Nikolić as Prle
- Vojislav Brajović as Tihi
- Miki Manojlović as Paja Bakšiš
- Zlata Petković as Marija
- Pavle Vujisić as Joca
- Čedomir Petrović as Zriki
- Vladan Holec as Mile
- Stevo Žigon as Sturmbannführer Krüger
- Rudolf Ulrich as Standartenführer Müller
- Aleksandar Berček as Čibi/ Mrki
- Dragomir Felba as Striko
- Rade Marković as Milan
- Slobodan Aligrudić as Skale
- Ivan Bekjarev as Cane Kurbla
- Miroljub Lešo as Slavko
- Dušan Perković as Nikola
- Vasa Pantelić as Krsta Mišić
- Predrag Milinković as Gojko
- Mihajlo Janketić as Hauptscharführer Vlada Rus
- Bata Kameni as patrol leader
- Strahinja Mojić as agent
- Dušan Vujimović as tinsmith
- Milivoje Tomić as bookbinder
- Cane Firaunović as Obersturmführer König
- Miroslav Bijelić as Obersturmführer Bauer
- Božidar Pavićević as Untersturmführer Dünst
- Danilo Lazović as Srba
- Svetlana Bojković as Olivera
- Jelena Čvorović as Nina
- Aleksandar Hrnjaković as Miro
- Branko Cvejić as Jockey
- Slobodanka Žugić as Klara
- Pavle Vujisić as postman Joca
- Slobodan Novaković as Cvika
- Zlata Numanagić as Dragana
- Vidoje Vujović as guard
- Radmila Teodorović as Lili
- Nikola Jovanović as Sturmbannführer Frank
- Zorica Mirković as Milica
- Dragomir Čumić as Sirano
- Marko Todorović as Stevan
- Srboljub Milin as Kosinus
- Braca Gavrilović as Uvce
- Vera Dedić as Lenče
- Đorđe Jelisić as Zare
- Josif Tatić as Nenad
- Vesna Pećanac as Marija
- Janez Vrhovec as the minister
- Nada Kasapić as the minister's wife
- Rastislav Jović as Cibe
- Ramiz Sekić as Agronomist
- Mida Stevanović as Zoran
- Mihajlo Paskaljević as Spira
- Voja Mirić as Doctor Borić
- Miodrag Radovanović as engineer Ristić
- Zorka Manojlović as Zriki's mother
- Ivan Manojlović as German general
- Tatjana Lukjanova as Slavko's mother
- Predrag Ćeramilac as sculptor
- Milan Puzić as Dragana's uncle
- Bogoljub Petrović as railwayman
- Ljiljana Sedlar as Stevan's wife
- Žiža Stojanović as Uvce's wife
- Eugen Werber as Hans Schmidt
- Božidar Savićević as Marko
- Zoran Stoiljković as Šule
- Melita Bihalji as German woman
- Predrag Panić as Moma
- Mladen Nedeljković as Uroš
- Zoran Milosavljević as Doctor Janković
- Ivan Sebalj as Bane
- Miomir Radević as Ratko
- Faik Imeri as Mija
- Milo Miranović as fisherman, Milica's father
- Mirko Bulović as sailor
- Danica Aćimac as the sailor's wife
- Živka Matić as Moma's mother
- Ivo Jakšić as Nina's stepfather
- Stevan Minja as gendarme
- Ljubomir Ćipranić as gendarme
- Veljko Marinković as agent

== Episodes ==
No.	Title	English title	Original release date	Prod. code
1	"Bolnica"	"The Hospital"	December 22, 1974	101
2	"Garaža"	"The Garage"	December 29, 1974	102
3	"Izdajnik"	"The Traitor"	January 5, 1975	103
4	"Štamparija"	"The Printing Office"	January 12, 1975	104
5	"Pečurke"	"The Mushrooms"	January 19, 1975	105
6	"Kanal"	"The Channel"	January 26, 1975	106
7	"Banjički logor"	"The Camp in Banjica"	February 2, 1975	107
8	"Poštar"	"The Mailman"	February 9, 1975	108
9	"Paja Bakšiš"	"Paja the Tip"	February 16, 1975	109
10	"Vlada Rus"	"Vlada the Russian"	February 23, 1975	110
11	"Provala"	"Breaking and Entering"	March 2, 1975	111
12	"Ranjenici"	"The Wounded"	March 9, 1975	112
13	"Brodogradilište"	"The Shipyard"	March 16, 1975	113

== See also ==
- Potpisani (2009 parody series)
