= Pilatovci =

Pilatovci (Cyrillic: Пилатовци) can refer to the following places:

== Montenegro ==
- Pilatovci, Nikšić, a village in the municipality of Nikšić

== Croatia ==
- Pilatovci, Ozalj, a village in the municipality of Ozalj
