= Milan Komnenić =

Serbian writer and politician

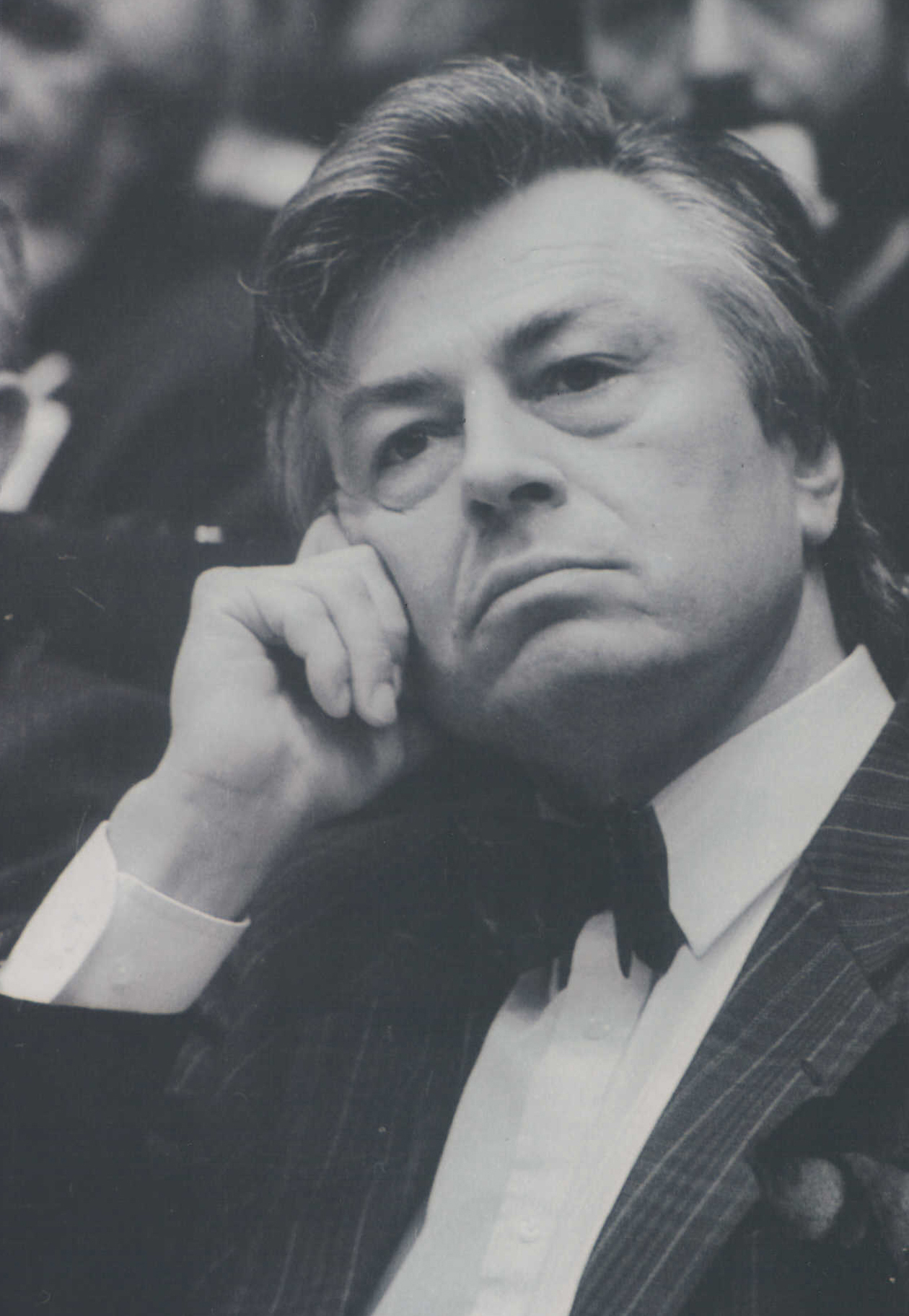

Minister of Culture of Serbia
- In office 24 October 2000 – 25 January 2001
- Preceded by: Željko Simić
- Succeeded by: Branislav Lečić

Minister of Information of FR Yugoslavia
- In office 18 January 1999 – 25 April 1999

Personal details
- Born: 8 November 1940 Pilatovci, Zeta Banovina, Kingdom of Yugoslavia
- Died: 24 July 2015 (aged 74) Belgrade, Serbia
- Resting place: Belgrade New Cemetery
- Party: Serbian Renewal Movement, Democratic Party
- Education: University of Belgrade Faculty of Philology
- Occupation: Writer, politician

Milan Komnenić (Serbian Cyrillic: Милан Комненић; 8 November 1940 – 24 July 2015) was a Serbian poet, translator, essayist and politician.

== Biography ==
Komnenić was born on 8 November 1940 in the village of Pilatovci near Nikšić in present-day Montenegro.

He edited the literary magazines Vidici, Delo, and Relation, and also worked as an editor in the publishing house Prosveta. He initiated three editions: Erotikon, Prosveta, and Hispanoamerički roman. He translated works from Italian, French, Spanish and German with over fifty translated books.

Komnenić was also involved in politics in the 1990s. Together with Vuk Drašković, he participated in the creation of the Serbian Renewal Movement and participated in the 1991 protests in Belgrade against the regime of Slobodan Milošević. He later became Minister of Information of the Federal Republic of Yugoslavia on 18 January 1999, as a member of the party. He was Minister of Information during the events leading up to the proposed Rambouillet Agreement and the beginning of the NATO bombing of Yugoslavia until he resigned on 25 April 1999. He was briefly the Minister of Culture of the Republic of Serbia in the transitional government of Milomir Minić from October 2000 to January 2001. In 2007, he joined the Democratic Party.

As a poet, he published his first book in 1966. It was a poetry book titled Noć pisana noću. His first poems tend to renew the unjustly neglected past, while later he turned to anti-poetry. He composed a large number of songs according to the principles of critical neorealism. His poems have been included in several anthologies, and his poetry and essays have been translated into many languages (French, Italian, English, Russian, Slovak, Hungarian, Romanian, Polish, Slovenian and Macedonian). Among other things, he translated from the French original an extensive study by Denis de Rougemont called Love in the Western World.

He published twenty-one collections of poems, four books of reviews, two anthologies and more than 200 articles. He was awarded the Mladost Award, Isidora Sekulić Award (for his 1975 essay Eros i znak) and the Milan Rakić Award.

Komnenić died on 24 July 2015. He is interred in the Alley of Distinguished Citizens in the Belgrade New Cemetery.

== Published books ==
- Noć pisana noću (1966)
- Gvozdena loza (1970)
- Orionov put (1971)
- Tapija o izvoru (1972)
- Ti, riđokosa olujo (1974)
- Antologija novijeg srpskog pesništva (1974)
- Eros i znak (1975–76)
- Svođenje računa (1980)
- Mamuza za njene sapi (1980)
- Ilinka (1984)
- Izgon (1987)
- Jona (1988)
- Kosovski polom (1988)
- Uznesenja (1990)
- Opela (1990)
- Jeka (1995)
- Ždral na Bosforu (2001)
- Tunika za kugu (2001)
- Klopka u Rambujeu (2006)
