= Branislav Lečić =

Serbian actor, director and politician (born 1955)

- Бранислав Лечић
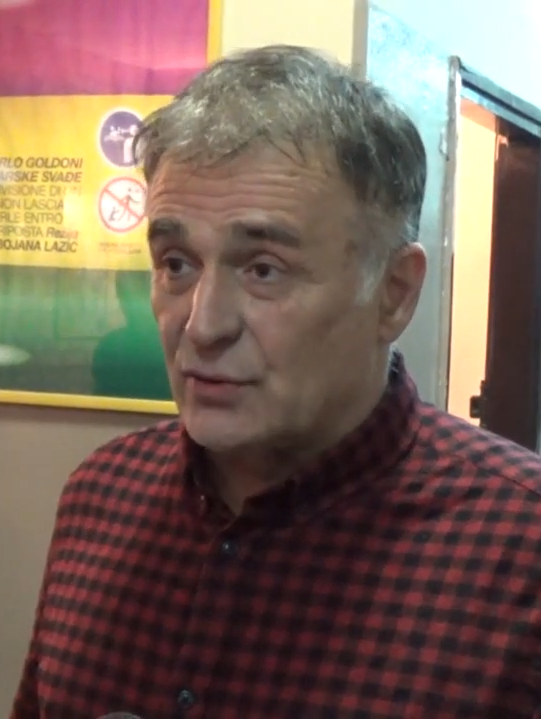
- Lečić in 2020

Member of the National Assembly
- Incumbent
- Assumed office 17 November 2026

Minister of Culture of Serbia (Note: The ministry was named the Ministry of Culture from 25 January 2001, the Ministry of Culture and Public Information from 23 May 2002 and the Ministry of Culture and Media from 2 April 2003.)
- In office 25 January 2001 – 3 March 2004
- Prime Minister: Zoran Đinđić; Zoran Živković
- Preceded by: Milan Komnenić
- Succeeded by: Dragan Kojadinović

Personal details
- Born: 25 August 1955 (age 71) Šabac, PR Serbia, FPR Yugoslavia
- Party: Independent
- Other political affiliations: AV–US (2026–present); Democrats of Serbia (2021); DS (1991–2005; 2014–2020); DHSS (2010–2014); My Serbia (2008–2010); LDP (2005–2007)
- Spouse(s): Ivana Vujadinović Nina Radulović (m. 2010; div. 2017)
- Children: 3
- Education: Faculty of Dramatic Arts
- Occupation: Actor, director, politician

Branislav Lečić (Serbian: Бранислав Лечић; born 25 August 1955) is a Serbian actor, theatre director and politician who has been a member of the National Assembly since November 2026. He served as Minister of Culture in the governments of Zoran Đinđić and Zoran Živković from 2001 to 2004.

Since his film debut in 1977, Lečić has worked extensively in film, theatre and television. He is best known for his roles as the Royal Army officer Miloš Radekić in Silent Gunpowder (1990), the poet Aleksa Šantić in the television film Moj brat Aleksa (1991), the literature professor Teodor Kraj in The Professional (2003) and Captain Tasić in St. George Shoots the Dragon (2008). For Silent Gunpowder he won the Golden Arena for Best Actor at the Pula Film Festival and shared the Silver St. George for Best Actor at the 17th Moscow International Film Festival with Mustafa Nadarević. He has been a member of the Yugoslav Drama Theatre ensemble since 1981, where his roles include Hamlet, and teaches acting at the Faculty of Dramatic Arts in Belgrade.

A member of the Democratic Party (DS) from 1991, Lečić co-founded the Liberal Democratic Party in 2005, led the My Serbia movement in the 2008 election and later joined the Christian Democratic Party of Serbia, before returning to the DS in 2014. In 2020 a DS faction opposed to party president Zoran Lutovac elected him party leader, but the ministry in charge of the party register refused to record him as president in February 2021, after which he formed the Democrats of Serbia movement. He was elected to the National Assembly in the 2026 parliamentary election on the Aleksandar Vučić – United Serbia list led by the Serbian Progressive Party (SNS). In 2021 actress Danijela Štajnfeld accused him of rape, which he denied; the Higher Public Prosecutor's Office in Belgrade dismissed the case the same year.

== Early life and education ==
Lečić was born in Šabac on 25 August 1955. He graduated in acting from the Faculty of Dramatic Arts in Belgrade in 1978.

== Acting career ==
=== Film and television ===
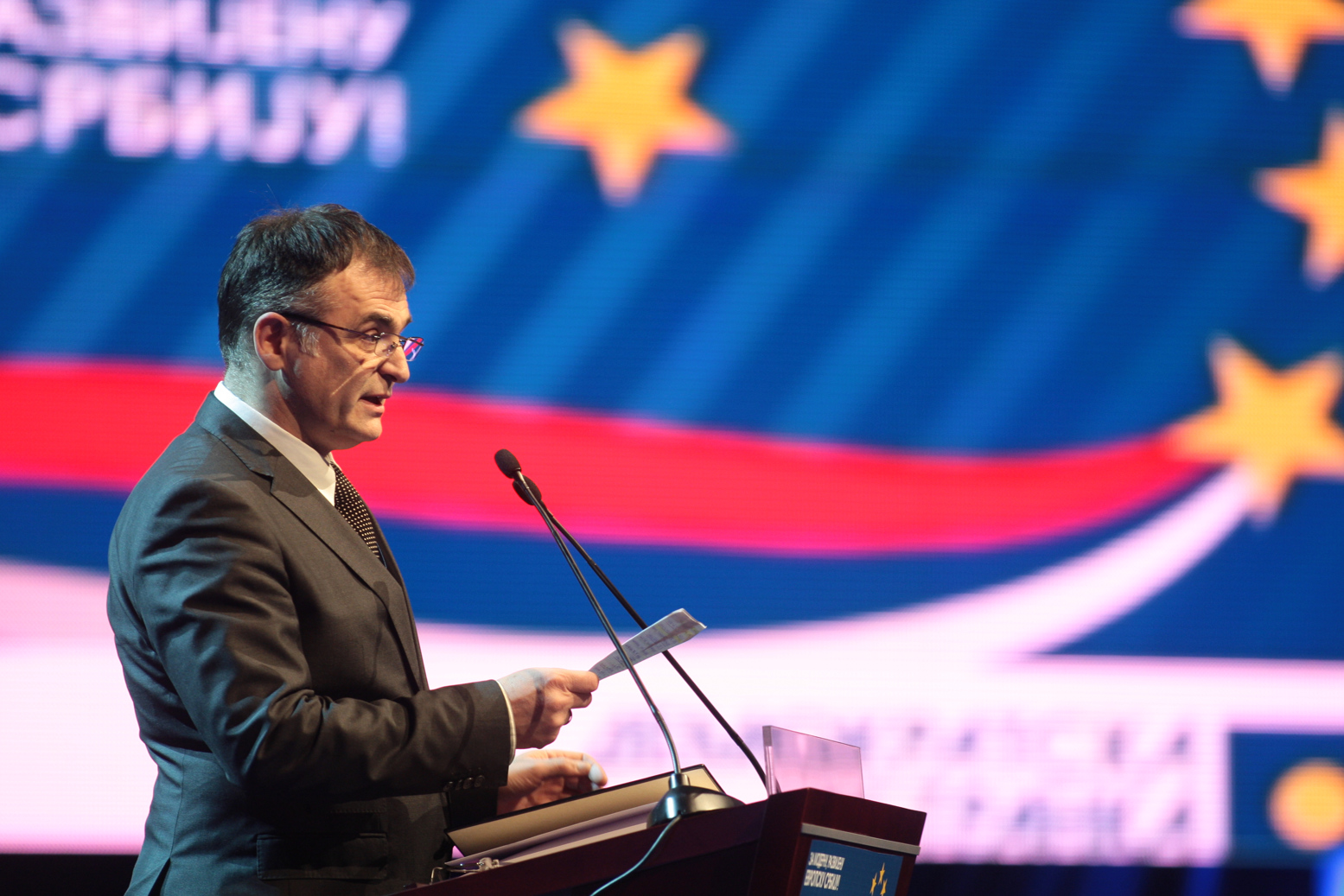
Lečić speaking at the Democratic Party convention in December 2010

Lečić made his film debut in Goran Marković's Specijalno vaspitanje (1977), in the lead role of the rebellious Fikret. His performance was praised by critics, including Slaven Ivanović, Gavrilo Milivojević, Savo Milosavljević, Dragan Bajetić and Goran Jovanović, the last of whom expressed concern that Lečić would be typecast as a young and liberal rebel. Supporting roles in Hajduk (1980) and Dečko koji obećava (1981), and the lead in Direktan prenos (1982), followed.

He rose to prominence as the rebellious Crni in the miniseries Sivi dom (1986), alongside Bata Živojinović and Dragan Nikolić; the series was popular across Yugoslavia and made him a household name.

After My Uncle's Legacy (1988), with Fabijan and Filip Šovagović, and the role of Sultan Bayezid in Battle of Kosovo (1989), he played the former Royal Army officer Miloš Radekić, the royalist opponent of the Partisan commander Španac (Nadarević), in Bato Čengić's Silent Gunpowder (1990). The role won him the Golden Arena for Best Actor at the 1990 Pula Film Festival, and he shared the Silver St. George for Best Actor with Nadarević at the 1991 Moscow International Film Festival. In 1991 he played the poet Aleksa Šantić in the television film Moj brat Aleksa and Crveni Božo in Charuga. He also appeared in Three Tickets to Hollywood (1993) and as Mustafa in Emir Kusturica's Underground (1995).

In 2002 he starred in Labyrinth, which earned him an Apollo Award for Outstanding Achievement in a Motion Picture at the Novi Sad Culture and Theatre Festival. In 2003 he played the Serbian language and literature professor Teodor "Teja" Kraj in The Professional, a performance praised by critics including Jasmina Ahmetagić and Muharem Pervić. He played Captain Tasić in St. George Shoots the Dragon (2008), alongside Lazar Ristovski, Zoran Cvijanović and Bora Todorović, and Nikola Pašić in the 2021 series Alexander of Yugoslavia.

Lečić appears in Boris Malagurski's documentary The Weight of Chains (2011).

=== Theatre ===
Lečić has been a member of the Yugoslav Drama Theatre (JDP) ensemble since 1981. At the JDP he played Hamlet (1992) and later Claudius (2005) in Hamlet, and appeared in productions including Uncle Vanya, Othello, Lorenzaccio and Nora!. He has also performed at the Zvezdara Theatre, Atelje 212, Madlenianum, the National Theatre in Belgrade, the Split Summer Festival and the Dubrovnik Summer Festival. He was one of the founders of several alternative theatre companies of the 1970s and 1980s.

As a director he has staged The Robbers at the JDP and St. George Slays the Dragon at the National Theatre in Athens, among other productions, and in 2017 he directed Hamlet. He founded LekArt, a school of acting, dance and singing, where he also teaches. His awards include several Sterijino pozorje awards, the JDP annual award (seven times between 1993 and 2019) and the Emperor Constantine Award of the Niš film festival.

=== Voice work and music ===
Lečić has recited poetry, narrated audiobooks and recorded radio dramas. He has voiced characters in numerous Serbian-language dubs of animated films, including Anger in Inside Out and Spider-Man Noir in Spider-Man: Into the Spider-Verse.

He also recorded Bubamara, a Serbian-language ballad, with the Montenegrin singer Knez.

== Political career ==
=== Early activism and Minister of Culture ===
During the rule of Slobodan Milošević, Lečić was one of the leaders of the March 1991 student protest at the Terazije fountain in Belgrade, known as the "Plush Revolution" (Plišana revolucija). After the victory of the Democratic Opposition of Serbia (DOS) in 2000, he was appointed Minister of Culture in the government of Zoran Đinđić, taking office on 25 January 2001. He remained in office in the cabinet of Zoran Živković until 3 March 2004.

=== LDP, My Serbia and DHSS (2005–2014) ===
When Čedomir Jovanović left the DS in 2005, Lečić followed him and became one of the founders of the Liberal Democratic Party (LDP). He left the LDP in 2007 and later joined the Christian Democratic Party of Serbia (DHSS). In the meantime he founded the My Serbia movement (Pokret Moja Srbija), whose list, headed by Lečić, ran in the 2008 parliamentary election. In 2010 the movement joined the DHSS.

=== Return to the DS and leadership dispute (2014–2021) ===
Lečić returned to the DS in the summer of 2014, when Bojan Pajtić became its president, and later served as a DS vice-president. He ran for party president at the June 2018 electoral assembly, finishing third with 123 delegate votes behind Zoran Lutovac (659) and Gordana Čomić (468). In February 2019 he backed the "One of Five Million" protests against President Aleksandar Vučić, calling them a new "Plush Revolution".

In 2020 Lečić led a faction opposed to Lutovac. On 26 September 2020 the faction held a party election, which the DS leadership did not recognise, at which Lečić was the only candidate for president; Lutovac's leadership then expelled Lečić and 52 other members. In February 2021 the Ministry of State Administration and Local Self-Government rejected his request to be registered as the party's president, finding that the decisions under which he had been elected were contrary to the party statute; Lečić called the decision political. On 28 February 2021 he launched the Democrats of Serbia (Demokrate Srbije), a citizens' movement which he described as social-democratic and liberal rather than a new party.

=== 2026 election ===
During the 2024–2026 Serbian anti-corruption protests, Lečić visited the pro-government camp of "students who want to study" in Pionirski Park (Ćacilend) in March 2025, telling them he supported their ideas, according to Večernje novosti. In September 2026 he was placed 15th on the Aleksandar Vučić – United Serbia list, led by the SNS, for the snap parliamentary election. The list won 103 of 250 seats, and Lečić's mandate was confirmed at the constitutive session of the 15th National Assembly on 17 November 2026.

== Rape allegation ==
On 22 March 2021 it was reported that actress Danijela Štajnfeld had told the Higher Public Prosecutor's Office in Belgrade that Lečić raped her in 2012; Lečić denied the accusation. On the same day, Insajder published an audio recording of what appears to be a phone conversation between Lečić and Štajnfeld about the alleged rape, which had been submitted to the prosecutor's office.

On 13 July 2021 the Higher Public Prosecutor's Office dismissed the case, stating that there were no grounds for suspicion that the alleged offence, or any other offence prosecuted ex officio, had been committed. Štajnfeld's lawyer, Božo Prelević, announced an objection to the Appellate Public Prosecutor's Office, while Lečić's lawyers described the decision as belated justice. Štajnfeld later filed a constitutional appeal seeking an investigation; as of November 2026 the Constitutional Court had not ruled on it. According to Štajnfeld, Lečić brought defamation and false-accusation proceedings against her.

== Personal life ==
Lečić has a son, Ivan, and a daughter, Ana, from his first marriage to Ivana Vujadinović, the older sister of Bojana Vujadinović. He was later married to the television presenter Nina Radulović, with whom he has a son, Lav; they separated in 2016 and divorced in 2017. He has worked with various charities, including with his colleague Marko Živić.

== Selected filmography ==
=== Film ===
Year	Title	Role	Notes
1977	Specijalno vaspitanje	Fikret	
1980	Hajduk	Captain Topolac	
1987	Oktoberfest	Lepi	
1988	My Uncle's Legacy	Vinko Maglica	
1989	Battle of Kosovo	Bayezid	
1990	Silent Gunpowder	Miloš Radekić	Golden Arena for Best Actor; Silver St. George for Best Actor
1991	Charuga	Crveni Božo	
1993	Three Tickets to Hollywood	Gavrilo	
1995	Underground	Mustafa	
2002	Labyrinth	Milan Aksentijević	
2003	The Professional	Teodor "Teja" Kraj	
2008	St. George Shoots the Dragon	Captain Tasić	

=== Television ===
Year	Title	Role	Notes
1985	Priče iz fabrike	Ivan Đaković	
1986	Sivi dom	Crni	7 episodes
1987	Vuk Karadžić	Hajduk Veljko	4 episodes
1991	Moj brat Aleksa	Aleksa Šantić	Television film
1998–1999	Porodično blago	Ljubomir Starčević "Ljuba Ris"	
2007–2008	Vratiće se rode	Pera	
2013–2015	Zvezdara	Stole "Stenli"	
2018–2019	Pogrešan čovjek	Dimitrije Crnković	
2021	Alexander of Yugoslavia	Nikola Pašić	

=== Serbian dubs ===
Year	Film	Role
2002	Aladdin and the King of Thieves	Saluk
2003	Monsters, Inc.	Henry J. Waternoose
2003	Finding Nemo	Chum
2004	Lady and the Tramp	Jim Dear
2005	Home on the Range	Larry the Duck
2007	Surf's Up	Reggie Belafonte
2007	The Simpsons Movie	Ned Flanders; Barney Gumble; Dr. Julius Hibbert
2008	Kung Fu Panda	Tai Lung
2009	Ice Age: Dawn of the Dinosaurs	Buck
2013	Despicable Me 2	Eduardo "El Macho" Perez
2015	Inside Out	Anger
2016	Ice Age: Collision Course	Buck
2018	Spider-Man: Into the Spider-Verse	Spider-Man Noir

== See also ==
- Cinema of Serbia

== Notes ==
Government offices
Preceded by Milan Komnenić	Minister of Culture of Serbia; 2001–2004	Succeeded by Dragan Kojadinović
