= Radoš Bajić =

Serbian actor and scenarist

- Радош Бајић
- Born: 24 September 1953 (age 72); Medveđa, Trstenik, PR Serbia, Yugoslavia
- Other name: Radašin
- Occupations: Actor and scenarist
- Years active: 1975–present
- Spouse: Milena
- Children: Jelena and Nedeljko

Radoš Bajić (Serbian Cyrillic: Радош Бајић; born 24 September 1953) is a Serbian actor and screenwriter. He appeared in more than fifty films since 1975. The scenarist is a series of Selo gori, a baba se češlja (English: The village is burning, and the grandmother is combing her hair), the most watched series in Serbian history.

== Selected filmography ==
Film
Year	Title	Role	Notes
1999	The White Suit	Vlasnik	
1981	The Falcon		
1979	Battle of the Eagles		
1975	The Day That Shook the World	Nedeljko Čabrinović	
1981	Thisrt		
1982	Sabinjanke	Raif Nelzon	
2012	Led		scriptwriter
2016	The Rise of the Tiger		

TV
Year	Title	Role	Notes
1984	Oj Moravo	Narator	
1987-1988	Vuk Karadžić	Sima Milutinović Sarajlija	
1995	Third time lucky	Sekula	scriptwriter
2007-2017	Selo gori, a baba se češlja	Radašin	scriptwriter
2017	Dogs are lying, the wind is carrying	Don Gladiola	scriptwriter
2018	Šifra Despot	Jovo Agbaba	scriptwriter
