= Stevo Žigon =

Slovene-Serbian actor and director

- Стево Жигон
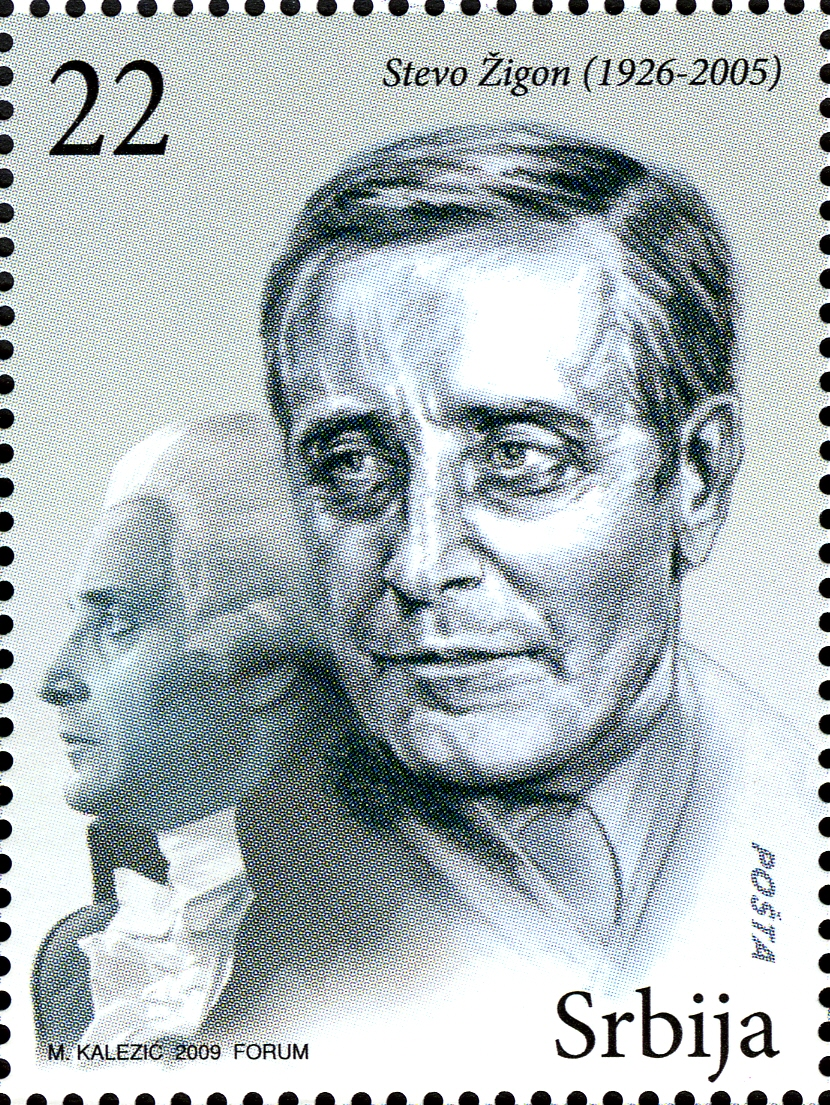
- Stevo Žigon on a 2009 Serbian stamp
- Born: 8 December 1926; Ljubljana, Kingdom of Serbs, Croats and Slovenes
- Died: 28 December 2005 (aged 79); Belgrade, Serbia and Montenegro
- Education: Faculty of Dramatic Arts
- Alma mater: University of Arts in Belgrade
- Occupations: Actor, theatre director, writer

Štefan "Stevo" Žigon (Serbian Cyrillic: Стево Жигон; 8 December 1926 – 28 December 2005) was a Yugoslav actor, theatre director, and writer.

== Biography ==
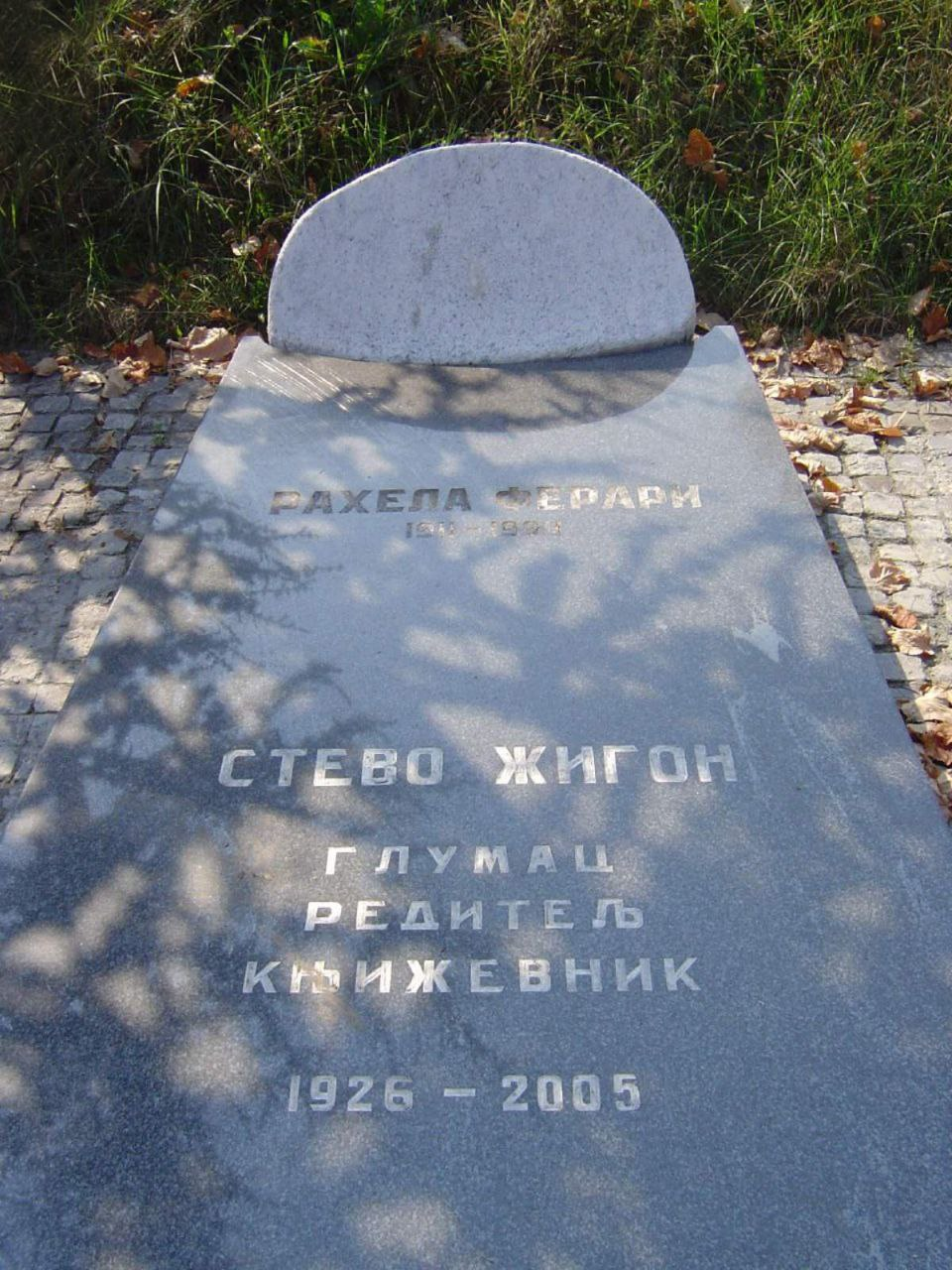
Grave of Stevo Žigon in Belgrade

His origins were primarily Italian. He was born in Ljubljana, Slovenia, then part of the Kingdom of Serbs, Croats and Slovenes. His family were Slovene immigrants from the Slovenian Littoral, which was under Italian administration. His father was from the village of Volčji Grad near Komen in the Karst region, while his mother came from the Slovene community in Trieste (now in Italy). The family lived in Trieste until the Fascist takeover in 1922, when they fled to the neighboring Kingdom of Serbs, Croats and Slovenes.

He studied acting in Ljubljana and Leningrad. He graduated in 1952, from the Academy for Theatre Arts in Belgrade. On faculty for acting in Belgrade he was one of the first assistants. Because of his knowledge of the German language and manners, he often played cynical and cold German officers. He was best known for playing "Krieger", chief of Belgrade Gestapo, in the popular 1970s TV series Otpisani and Povratak otpisanih.

During his youth, Žigon was an assiduous reader; he was fascinated by poetry, with his favorite poets being Alojz Gradnik, Igo Gruden, and Oton Župančič.

In 1941, aged 15, as a member of Communist Youth League, he participated in many sabotage actions organized by the Liberation Front of the Slovenian People. In 1942, Žigon was captured by the Italian Army. As a minor, he was spared from execution and spent a year in an Italian military prison in the Province of Ljubljana. After the Italian armistice in September 1943, he was captured by the Wehrmacht and sent to the Dachau (his prisoner number was 61185), where he learned German.

In 1968, at the time of the student demonstrations in Belgrade, Žigon emerged and performed Danton's Death; he played Robespierre for the students. The speech he made while his character was on trial caused the assembled students to explode into enthusiastic applause.

He was married to Serbian actress Jelena Jovanović - Žigon. The couple's daughter Ivana is also an actress.

== Filmography ==
Year	Title	Role	Notes
1950	Čudotvorni mač		
1950	Crveni cvet		
1957	Vratiću se	Branko Medan ... pukovnik	
1958	Kala	Filozof	
1959	Pet minuta raja	Stevan	
1960	X-25 javlja	Hans Binder	
1961	L'enclos	Dragulavic	
1964	Službeni položaj	Urednik novina	
1966	Amandus	Joannes	
1966	Rondo	Mladen	
1966	Tople godine		
1967	Memento	Vili Miler	
1968	Opatica i komesar	Doktor Simić	
1968–1969	Rinaldo Rinaldini	Cavalcanti	TV series
1970	Oxygen	Marko	
1971	Putovanje na mjesto nesreće	Nino, muz	
1972	Devojka sa Kosmaja	Major Beker	
1972	Walter Defends Sarajevo	Dr. Mišković	
1974	Otpisani	Kriger	
1974	Parlog		
1974	Strah	Blagot Balasica	
1976	Idealist	Priest from Zapolje	
1976	Povratak otpisanih	Kriger	
1978	Ward Six	Komandant grada	
1978	Occupation in 26 Pictures	Hubička	
1979	Journalist	Tomac	
1980	Došlo doba da se ljubav proba	Direktor skole	
1981	Šesta brzina	Načelnik	
1982	Nastojanje	Profesor Herak	
1982	Deseti brat	Mr. Piskav	
1983	Kako sam sistematski uništen od idiota	Stevo Žigon	
1984	The Secret Diary of Sigmund Freud	Professor Eberhardt	
1985	The Red and the Black	Upravitelj iz Trsta	
1986	Miss	Jork Morlok	
1987	The Harms Case	Profesor	
1988	P.S. - Post Scriptum		
1988	Haloa - praznik kurvi	Profesor Manfred / Husband	
1991	Bračna putovanja	Grof Johan	
1993	Bolje od bekstva	Pozorišni reditelj	
1993	Kaži zašto me ostavi	Starac	
