= Suzana Mančić =

Serbian actress, singer and presenter

- Сузана Манчић
- Born: 22 November 1956 (age 69); Belgrade, PR Serbia, Yugoslavia
- Occupations: Actress, singer and TV presenter
- Years active: 1973-present

Suzana Mančić (Serbian Cyrillic: Сузана Манчић; born 22 November 1956) is a Serbian actress, singer, media personality and television presenter.

== Early life and career ==
Mančić is the daughter of Aleksandar Mančić, from Pirot, a journalist with the newspaper Politika, and his wife Vera, from Valjevo. She began her career, shortly before her 18th birthday, with the song Ogledalce, ogledalce (Mirror, Mirror). In 1976, she sang at the Youth Festival in Subotica, winning second place. She recorded five albums and two singles. As well as Mirror, Mirror, she had a hit in 1987 with the song Pukla tikva na dva dela (A pumpkin cracked in two), and in the same year was the Yugoslav Eurovision entrant with the song Vreme nežnosti (A time of tenderness). Later she worked as an entertainment show host, and for many years led the TV show where she pulled out "Dobin LOTO" combinations. Because of that she earned the nickname LOTO girl, and became a pop icon in Yugoslavia.

During the 1990s, she participated in a traveling comic-erotic theater play Sekplozija. In August 2004, she appeared on the cover and inner pages of the Serbian edition of Playboy in an issue which completely sold out. In 2014, she returned to television as the host of the show Stotka on Pink TV, and in 2017, had a show called Suzana's Choice.

She had survived a car accident in 1986 with the singer Halid Bešlić. She was married for eight years to Nebojša Kunić, a drummer with the band Sedmorica Mladih (Seven Youth), with whom she has two daughters, Teodora and Natalia. She has been with her current husband since 2000.

== Film and television ==
Mančić has appeared in several films.

- Selo gori, a baba se češlja (2007-2008) as Svetlana
- Hotel With 7 Stars (2002)
- Fan (Serbian film) (1985) as Lydia Bauer
- Jugovizija (1987) as herself
- Picnic (1985)
- Zika's Dynasty (1985)
- Hi, Inspector (1985) as herself
