= Dejan Petković (singer) =

Serbian singer

Dejan Petković (Serbian Cyrillic: Дејан Петковић) (born 1958 in Ćuprija, Serbia) is a Serbian singer and songwriter. His sister was actress and model Zlata Petković. He began his solo career in 1976 at the Omladinski festival with the song "Jednog dana". He has participated in various festivals in Yugoslavia, as well as co-operating with the rock band S Vremena Na Vreme early in their career as a bass guitarist. He also participated in Jugovizija 1981, Yugoslavia's show to select a song for the Eurovision Song Contest that year, with the song "Emanuelle," finishing 6th in the show.

== Discography ==
=== Studio albums ===
- Obaraš Me S Nogu (1979)
- Emanuelle (1981)
- Prevario Sam Se U Tebi (1983)

=== Singles ===
- Povratak (1976)
- Na Klupi Piše Volim Te / Vrag Bi Ga Znao (with Zlata Petković) (1978)
- Tako Mi Svega (1978)
- Oprosti Mi (1979)
- Sve Ima Kraj (1979)
- Moja Dijana (1980)
- Zaboravi / Baš Je Lepo S Tobom (1981)
