= Labyrinth (2002 film) =

2002 Yugoslavian thriller film

- Directed by: Miroslav Lekic
- Written by: Miroslav Lekic
- Starring: Dragan Nikolic
- Release date: 26 August 2002
- Running time: 115 minutes
- Country: FR Yugoslavia
- Language: Serbian

Labyrinth is a 2002 Yugoslavian thriller film directed by Miroslav Lekic. It was selected as the Serbian entry for the Best Foreign Language Film at the 75th Academy Awards, but it was not nominated.

== Cast ==
- Dragan Nikolic as Petar Aksentijevic 'Pop'
- Maja Sabljic as Suzana Lojtes
- Branislav Lecic as Milan Aksentijevic
- Katarina Radivojevic as Tamara Lojtes
- Nabila Khashoggi as Leila

== See also ==
- List of submissions to the 75th Academy Awards for Best Foreign Language Film
- List of Serbian submissions for the Academy Award for Best Foreign Language Film
