= Marko Kovač (director) =

- Born: April 9, 1981 (age 45); Belgrade, Yugoslavia
- Education: University of Belgrade
- Occupation: Architect
- Awards: Chess - 1st award Wolf Bites - Special award A Natural Source of Energy - 2nd award

Marko Kovač (Serbian Cyrillic: Марко Ковач; born 9 April 1981 in Belgrade, Yugoslavia, today Serbia) is a Serbian architect, screenwriter, film director, satirist, illustrator and composer. He is a member of Film Artists Association of Serbia.

== Filmography ==
- Chess, animated movie (1998) - 1st award of 31st review of film and video works by children of Yugoslavia at Kinoteka
- Vuk ujeda (Wolf Bites), short movie (2007) - Special award from Telekom Serbia
- Potpisani - episode 1 (2007) - Award Woody dwarf at the festival in Serbian Holywood 2011.
- Potpisani - episode 2 (2008)
- Water Means Life, short movie (2008)
- A Natural Source of Energy, short movie (2008) - 2nd award from TV FOX
- Insurance, short movie (2008) - became part of official movie for Belgrade FEST 2011.
- Carlos Trapéz, 10 short stories (2008, 2009)
- Belgrade 2010, short movie (2010) - became part of Beldocs film festival 2010.
- Potpisani - episode 3 (2010) - Award Woody dwarf for the 3rd place at the festival in Serbian Holywood 2012.
- Podbradak potpisanih - mini TV series / 5 episodes (2011)
- Psycho - done in 60 seconds, short movie (2011) - 1st award of Jameson J-Factory festival of movies for 60 seconds, 2012.
- Apocalypto / Greenwoodo, short movie (2012) - 2nd award of Jameson J-Factory festival of movies for 60 seconds, 2014. and Award as voted by the public on "Nikon European Film Festival" in London 2014/15.
- Potpisani - episode 4 (2013)
- Potpisani - episode 5 (2014)
- Yuhor danju, Yuhor noću, advertising (2015) - Main award (Grand Prix) at Yuhor competition
- The Circle, short movie (2015) - Main award at Mikro FAF 2015
- Potpisani - episode 6 (2016)
- Potpisani - episode 7 (2017)
- Potpisani - episode 8 (2019)
