= Vojislav Brajović =

Serbian actor and politician (born 1949)

Vojislav "Voja" Brajović
- Војислав "Воја" Брајовић
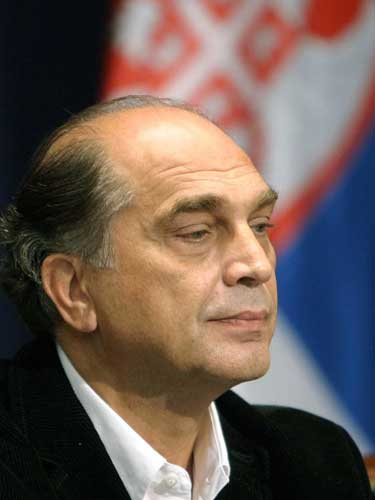
- Vojislav "Voja" Brajović

Minister of Culture
- In office 15 May 2007 – 7 July 2008
- Preceded by: Dragan Kojadinović
- Succeeded by: Nebojša Bradić

Advisor of the President of Serbia for Culture
- In office 31 July 2008 – 5 April 2012

Personal details
- Born: 11 May 1949 (age 77) Belgrade, FPR Yugoslavia
- Spouse: Milica Mihajlović
- Occupation: Actor

Vojislav "Voja" Brajović (Serbian Cyrillic: Војислав "Воја" Брајовић; born 11 May 1949) is a Serbian actor.

== Career ==
Brajović graduated from the Belgrade Faculty of Drama Arts in 1971. He has been a member of the Yugoslav Drama Theatre since 1969.

He has been the recipient of many domestic theatre awards, including three Sterija awards for acting, an annual award of the Serbian National Theatre in Novi Sad, an annual award of CNP from Podgorica, and eight annual awards of the Yugoslav Drama Theatre in Belgrade.

He is best known for his portrayal of Tihi, the wisecracking World War II resistance fighter in the cult 1970s TV series Otpisani and Povratak otpisanih.

== Political career ==
He served as the Minister of Culture in the Government of Serbia for the Democratic Party between 2007 and 2008. In July 2008, he was appointed to be an advisor on culture to the President Boris Tadić.

== Personal life ==
He is married to actress Milica Mihajlović and they have one child. His son from the first marriage is Vukota Brajović, an actor as well. His daughter also from the first marriage is well-known actress Iskra Brajović. His youngest son from the second marriage to actress Milica Mihajlović is Relja Brajović, the singer and lead guitarist of the hardcore band Majak.

Vojislav Brajović speaks English.

== Selected filmography ==
=== Film ===
Year	Title	Role	Notes
1992	Tito and Me	Josip Broz Tito	
2008	Turneja	Ljubic	
2025	Pearlescent Fog	Atanas Jovanovic	

=== Television ===
Year	Title	Role	Notes
1974	Otpisani	Tihi	TV series
1978	Povratak otpisanih	Tihi	TV series
1987–1988	Bolji zivot	Dusan Markovic 'Terminator'	TV series
2013–2019	Sindjelici	Sreten 'Sreta' Sindjelic	TV series
2021	Alexander of Yugoslavia	Miroslav Spalajković	TV series

=== Serbian dubs ===
Year	Film	Role
2002	Ice Age	Diego
2003	Finding Nemo	Jacques
2006	Ice Age: The Meltdown	Master Shifu
2008	Kung Fu Panda	Master Shifu
2007	The Simpsons Movie	Russ Cargill
2009	Ice Age: Dawn of the Dinosaurs	Diego
2010	Toy Story 3	Lotso
2011	Kung Fu Panda 2	Master Shifu
2012	Ice Age: Continental Drift	Diego
2015	The Good Dinosaur	Butch
2016	Kung Fu Panda 3	Master Shifu
2016	Ice Age: Collision Course	Diego
2016	Zootopia	Mayor Lionheart
2016	Finding Dory	Jacques

Year	Show	Role
2002	ChalkZone	Joe Tabootie

Government offices
Preceded by Dragan Kojadinović	Minister of Culture; 2007 – 2008	Succeeded by Nebojša Bradić
