= Dragan Kojadinović =

Serbian politician

Dragan Kojadinović Драган Којадиновић

Minister of Culture of Serbia
- In office March 3, 2004 – May 15, 2007
- Preceded by: Branislav Lečić
- Succeeded by: Vojislav Brajović

Personal details
- Born: 29 November 1954 (age 71) Banatski Karlovac, Yugoslavia (now Banatski Karlovac, Serbia)
- Party: Serbian Renewal Movement

Dragan Kojadinović (Serbian: Драган Којадиновић, born 29 November 1954) is a Serbian journalist and former Minister of Culture.

== Early life and education ==
He graduated from the Department of Yugoslav Literature and Serbian Language at the University of Belgrade Faculty of Philology.

== Career ==
For almost thirty years he has worked as a journalist, and was the first director of the Studio B independent television. in 1990. He is one of the founders of the Independent Serbian Journalist Association (NUNS), and is a director of the Metropolis television company and the President of the Serbian Renewal Movement Committee in Belgrade.

In 2004 he unsuccessfully campaigned to become the mayor of Belgrade.

== Personal life ==
He speaks English. He is married with two children.

Preceded by Branislav Lečić	Minister of Culture; 2004 – 2007	Succeeded by Vojislav Brajović
