= Danijela Štajnfeld =

Serbian actress and filmmaker

- Данијела Штајнфелд
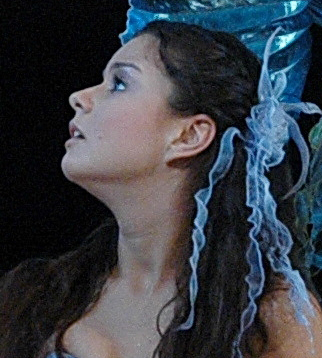
- Štajnfeld in 2009
- Born: 6 May 1984 (age 42); Ruski Krstur, SR Serbia, SFR Yugoslavia
- Education: University of Arts in Belgrade; Faculty of Dramatic Art (MFA)
- Occupations: Actress; filmmaker
- Years active: 2005–present
- Height: 5 ft 7 in (170 cm)

Danijela Štajnfeld (Serbian Cyrillic: Данијела Штајнфелд; born 6 May 1984) is a Serbian award-winning actress and filmmaker of Jewish and Rusyn origin. She rose to fame in Serbia with the 2005 film Ivko’s Feast. Štajnfeld is a two-time recipient of the Best Actress Award.

Štajnfeld expanded her career when she later moved to the U.S. She started working as a director with her debut film Hold Me Right, a documentary that focuses on sexual assault and its impact on survivors. Hold Me Right premiered at the Sarajevo Film Festival on August 18, 2020, and gained much acclaim for its sense of empowerment.

Originally, Štajnfeld did not intend to share her story, but only to give other people a platform to speak. Her story was included in the film after the rough cut was finished. Hold Me Right is a reflection of Štajnfeld’s journey of being a victim of sexual assault and the aftermath of it. In this film, she has not only highlighted her struggle but also included first-hand testimonies of other sexual assault survivors, but also the perpetrators, and the ripple effect of the tragedy enhanced by the culture of silence and indifference to the aftermath of trauma. On 22 March 2021, it was revealed that Štajnfeld accused Branislav Lečić, an actor and former Minister of Culture of Serbia, as her rapist.

Štajnfeld has also done stand-up in various comedy clubs in NYC.

== Personal life ==
Štajnfeld lives and works in New York City.

== Selected filmography ==
=== Television ===
Year	Title	Role	Notes
2005	Ivkova slava	Mariola	TV series; 6 episodes
2007	Ono naše što nekad bejaše	Ikica	TV series; 7 episodes
2008	Vratiće se rode	Emanuela	TV series; 7 episodes
2008-09	Ranjeni orao	Donka	TV series; 9 episodes
2015	Anya Karmanova: Euro Spy	Anya Karmanova	

=== Film ===
Year	Title	Role	Notes
2005	We Are Not Angels 2	Zorana	Credited as Danijela Stajfeld
2005	Ivko's Feast	Mariola	
2007	The Age of Virginity	Tanja	Short film
2009	Ranjeni orao	Donka	
2012	Beds Made & Sweaters On	Jogger	Short film
2013	Joan	Joan	Short film
2014	Half & Half	Eden	Short film
2015	Cash Only	Blerta	

== Theater ==
S.No	Name	Role	Producer/Venue
1	Delusion, Masque of Mortality	Elizabeth (lead)	Neil Patrick Harris, LA
2	RickHardt	Kate (lead)	John Donnelly, HB Ensemble, NYC
3	The Possessed	Lisa (lead)	F.M. Dostoevsky, National Theatre of Serbia
4	Angels In America	Angel (supporting)	Tony Kushner, Belgrade Drama Theater
5	Amadeus	Constanze (lead)	Peter Shaffer, Belgrade Drama Theater
6	Tartuffe	Marianne (supporting)	Yugoslav Drama Theater
7	Frederik or Boulevard of crime	Berenice (lead)	E. E. Schmitt, Belgrade Drama Theater
8	Little Mermaid	Little Mermaid (lead)	Ludmila Razumovskaya, Bosko Buha Theater
9	Moon in flame	Milena Barilli (lead)	Sanja Domazet, Belgrade Drama Theater
10	Daily command	Catherine (lead)	Vladimir Djurdjevic, Belgrade Drama Theater
11	Half-Price	Sania (lead)	Stevan Koprivica, Belgrade Drama Theater
12	Milk	Natasa (supporting)	Vasilis KatsIkonouris, Belgrade Drama Theater
13	Instant Sexual Education	Dacha (lead)	Dj. Milosavljevic, Bosko Buha Theater
14	Disharmonija	Lena (lead)	Sanja Domazet, Belgrade Drama Theater
15	Love, etc.	Eli (lead)	adapted by Julian Barnes, Belgrade Drama Theater

== Awards ==
- Best actress of Belgrade Drama Theater for the role of Lena in “Disharmonija”
- Best actress at Serbian National Drama Festival “Joakim Vujic”, for the role of Milena Pavlovic Barili in “Mesec u Plamenu”
