= Nina Radulović =

Serbian television presenter on Prva TV (born 1986)

- Нина Радуловић
- Born: 15 May 1986 (age 40); Belgrade, SR Serbia, Yugoslavia
- Education: University of Belgrade
- Years active: 2007–present
- Known for: Evropsko Lice (RTS morning programme)(host); 2008 Eurovision Song Contest 2008 (spokesperson)
- Height: 1.85 m (6 ft 1 in)
- Spouse: Branislav Lečić (m. 2010–17)
- Children: Lav

Nina Radulović (Serbian Cyrillic: Нина Радуловић; born 15 May 1986) is a Serbian television presenter on Prva TV. She is best known for her hosting duties on “The Stars Sing for Them” and Survivor Srbija on the FOX Serbia network (now PRVA TV).

== Education and career ==
Born in Belgrade in 1986, she finished primary and secondary school in her hometown, and later graduated and obtained Master's thesis at the University of Belgrade.

Her first television appearance was when she competed in the 2007–08 RTS reality series “Euro Face” to determine the co-hosts of the 2008 Eurovision Song Contest. Nina was a finalist but lost in the final vote. She was a co-host of the "Eurovision Countdown" show in 2008.

Since September 2008, she began working on the FOX Serbia network by hosting the show Survivor Special. The show accompanied the first season of Survivor Srbija, the highly successful Serbian version of the reality show Survivor. Survivor Special aired from October 2008 to February 2009. Nina Radulović was to host the show again for its second season, starting September 2009.

As of April 2009, she began hosting the television show "The stars sing for them", also aired on FOX.
