= The White Suit =

1999 UK-Yugoslavia film

The White Suit (Serbian: Belo odelo / Бело одело) is a 1999 Serbian language film directed by Lazar Ristovski. It was a co-production between the United Kingdom and the Federal Republic of Yugoslavia. It was Yugoslavia's official Best Foreign Language Film submission at the 72nd Academy Awards, but did not manage to receive a nomination.

== Cast ==
- Lazar Ristovski - Savo / Vuko Tiodorovic
- Radmila Shchogolyeva - Karmen
- Dragan Nikolić - Makro
- Bata Živojinović - Gospodin
- Danilo Stojković - Svestenik
- Bogdan Diklić - Masinovodja
- Radoš Bajić - Vlasnik

== See also ==
- List of submissions to the 72nd Academy Awards for Best Foreign Language Film
- List of Serbian submissions for the Academy Award for Best Foreign Language Film
