= Žiža Stojanović =

Serbian actress (1930–2025)

- Жижа Стојановић
- Born: 19 November 1930; Belgrade, Kingdom of Yugoslavia
- Died: 27 June 2025 (aged 94); Belgrade, Serbia
- Occupation: Actress
- Years active: 1949–2018
- Notable work: Zaga — Comrade Minister; Ljubina Bojić — More than a game Malčika — The Voter; Cana Fontana — Happy People
- Spouse: Vladislav Matić

Žiža Stojanović (19 November 1930 – 27 June 2025) was a Serbian film, theatre and television actress.

== Life and career ==
Stojanović was born in Belgrade on 19 November 1930. After the Second World War, she enrolled in the Third Women's Gymnasium and joined the Belgrade Cultural Society "Abrašević". She passed the audition and was given the role of Koštana. Although she was better known as a theater actress, she played in many films and series. She was a member of theaters in Niš, Novi Sad and Belgrade. In her career, she played over 120 theater roles, and for more than thirty years she was the first lady of the Belgrade Drama Theatre.

The audience remembers her as the waitress Cana Fontana from the series Happy People. She also appeared in the series Diplomci, Salaš u Mali Ritu, Otpisan, Bolji život, Porodićno blago, Ljubav, nakiva, panic, Vratiće se stork and many others. She starred in the films Povratak otpisanih, Balkan Express 2 and Tesna koža 3.

She was a participant in the first season of the reality show Zadruga. She lived and worked in Belgrade.

Stojanović spent the last years of her life in a nursing home, and died in Belgrade, on 27 June 2025, at the age of 94. At the time of her death, she was the third oldest actress in Serbia.

== Filmography ==
Year	Title	Role
1949	Barba Zhvane	
1961	The Voter	The Little One
1963	The Banquet in Šarengrad	
1963	Kir Janja	
1965	The Midnight Guest	
1967	The Dragonfly and the Tin Stove	
1969	The Deceased (TV)	Maid Anna
1969	Souffle	
1971	Leftists	Moca's Daughter Dushica
1971	Graduates	Zavala's Wife
1972	Laughter from the Stage: Contemporary Theater	
1972	Women's Conversations	
1973	Our Performances (TV Series)	
1975	At the Orpheum at the Dam (TV)	
1975	Wintering in Jakobsfeld	
1975	Salaš u Mali Rit (TV series)	
1975	Theatre in the house 3	Clerk
1975	Dismissed	Uvcet's wife
1975	Devil's ladder	
1975	Life is beautiful	Class teacher
1976	Return of the Dismissed	Anđelka
1976	Kitchen	
1977	Sequences and consequences	
1977	More than a game	Ljubina Bojić
1978	Return of the Dismissed (TV series)	Anđelka
1979	Happy Family	
1979	Happy Family (TV series)	
1979	Comrades	Prostitute
1979	Glow	
1980	Tobacco Road	
1980	It Was, It Was	
1980	Hot Wind	Bank Clerk
1981	Kir Janja	Juca's Wife
1981	Soldiers	Citizen with Supplies
1982	Lukićijada (TV series)	
1982	Pop Ćira and Pop Spira	Soka
1983	Man with Four Legs	Typist
1983	Marija, Where Are You...?	Danilov's Sister
1984	Moth	Stanka, Uncle's Neighbor
1984	Soldiers	Citizen with Supplies
1984	Jaguar's Leap	Agency Owner
1985	The Case of Laza Kostić	Secretary
1986	Master and Champita	Saleswoman
1987–1988	Better Life	Iva's Landlady
1988	Tight Skin 3	Cashier
1989	Comrade Minister	Zaga
1989	Balkan Express 2	Abbess
1989	Weekdays from Nine to Five	Neighbor
1990–1991	Better Life 2	Ivy's Landlady
1991	House to Demolish	Aunt Vida
1991	Little Joke	Mother-in-law
1991	In the Name of the Law	God's Woman
1993	Paradise	Wife Pište
1993	Happy People	Cana Fontana
1995–1996	Happy People 2	Cana Fontana
1998–1999	Family Treasure	Slavka
2001	Harold and Maud	
2002	Family Treasure 2	Slavka
2006	Love, Habit, Panic	Mrs. Marković
2007	Village People (TV Series)	Dragica
2007	The Stork Will Return	Aunt Smile
2013	Mamaroš	Neighbor
2015	Hangover (TV Series)	Neighbor on the Window
2018	The Love and Hate	Stamena
