= Dragan Nikolić =

Serbian actor

- Драган Николић
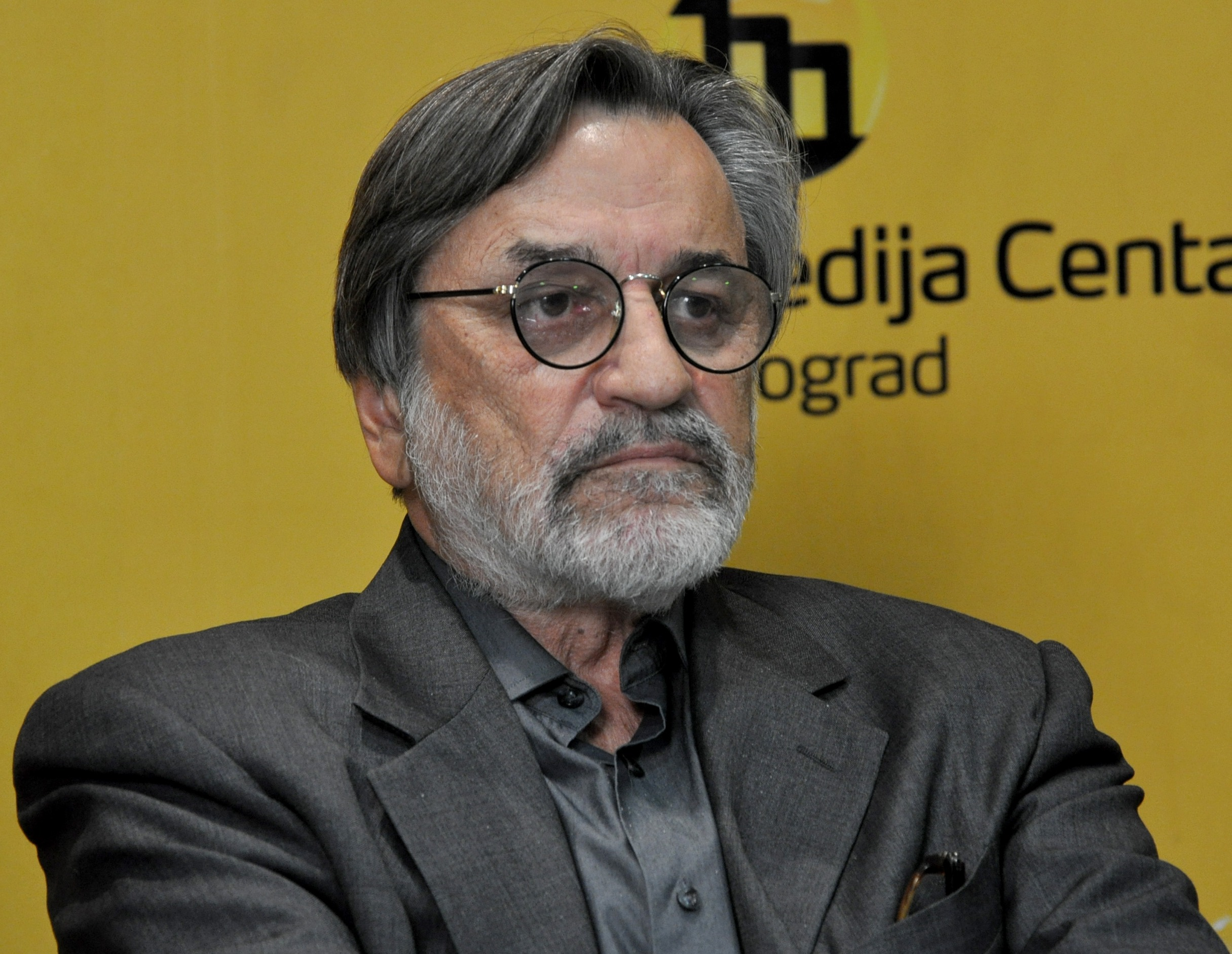
- Nikolić pictured in 2013
- Born: Dragoslav Nikolić; 20 August 1943; Belgrade, German-occupied Serbia
- Died: 11 March 2016 (aged 72); Belgrade, Serbia
- Education: Faculty of Dramatic Arts
- Alma mater: University of Arts in Belgrade
- Occupation: Actor
- Years active: 1964–2014
- Spouse: Milena Dravić (m. 1971)
- Awards: Pula Film Festival; Golden Arena (1981)

Dragoslav "Dragan" Nikolić (Serbian Cyrillic: Драгослав Драган Николић, pronounced [drǎgoslaʋ drǎɡan nǐkolit͡ɕ]; 20 August 1943 – 11 March 2016) was a Serbian and Yugoslav actor.

Nikolić studied at Dramatic Arts Academy in Belgrade. In 1967 he starred in the film Kad budem mrtav i beo, which was the beginning of a career that lasted 50 years. Dragan Nikolić has since appeared in many films of different genres and portrayed various characters, becoming one of the most recognizable actors in Serbian cinema. In 2000, he received the "Pavle Vuisić" Award for his lifework. From 2011 to 2013, he was the television host on the Serbian edition of quiz Who Wants to Be a Millionaire?.

His best known role was as Prle, a wisecracking World War II resistance fighter whom he portrayed in 1970s TV series Otpisani and Povratak otpisanih.

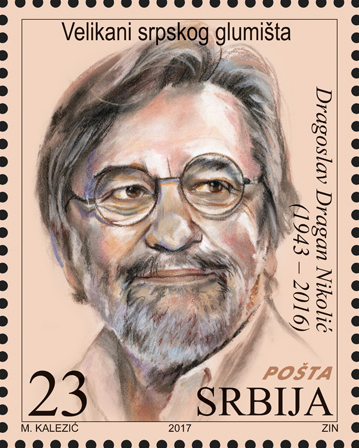
Nikolić on a 2017 Serbian stamp

== Personal life ==
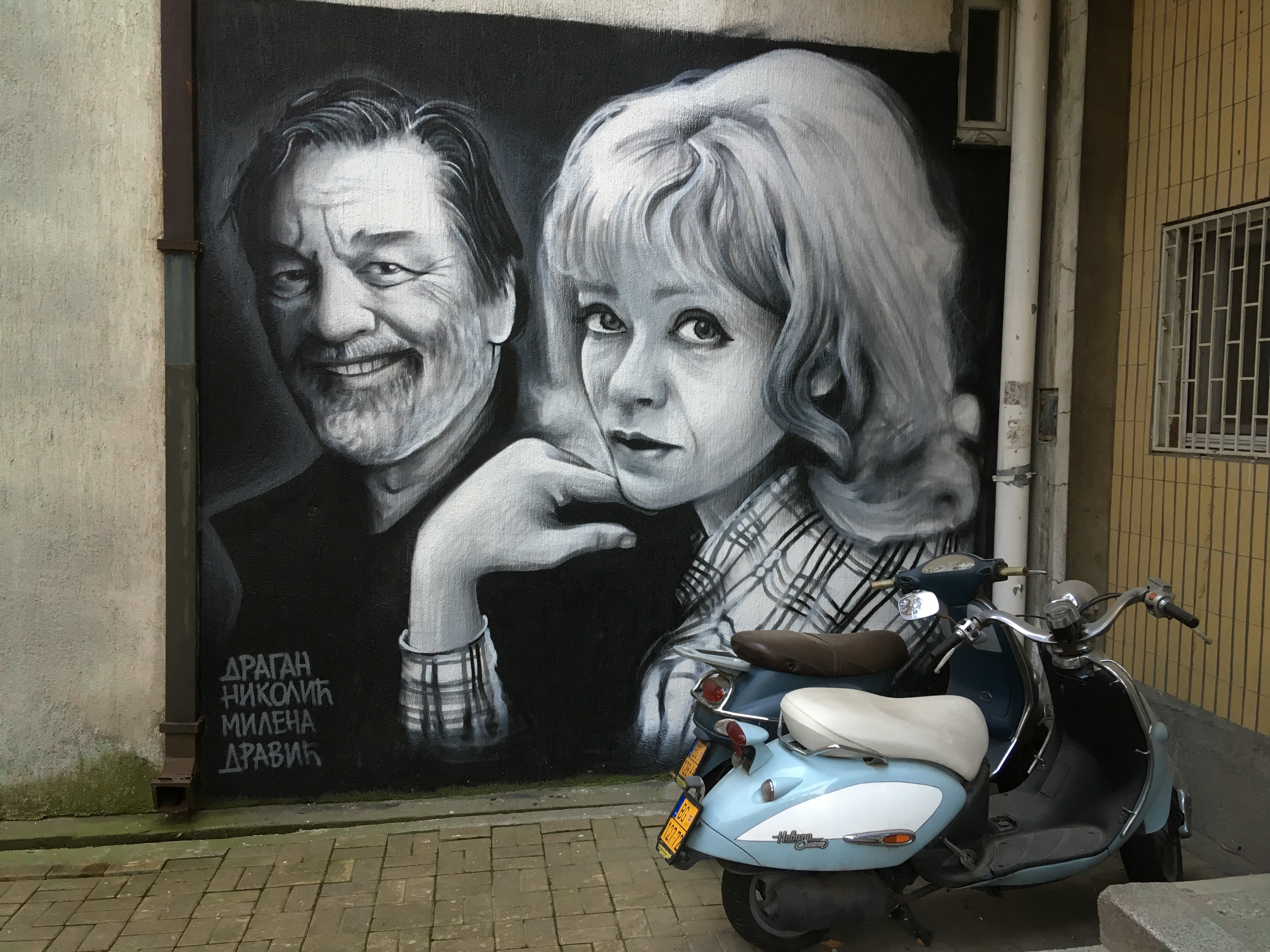
Dragan Nikolić & Milena Dravić mural, Vračar, Nevesinjska 11

His wife was the Serbian actress, Milena Dravić. They co-hosted the 1970s TV variety show Obraz uz obraz (Cheek toCheek).

== Selected filmography ==
List of acting performances in film and television
Year	Title	Role	Note
1966	The One Eyed Soldiers	Gangster	
1968	Three Hours to Love	Riki	
1971	Young and Healthy as a Rose	Stiv	
1971	The Role of My Family in the Revolution	Vaculić	
1974–1975	Otpisani	Prle	TV series (13 episodes)
1975	Backbone	Pavle Gvozdenović	
1978	Moment	Novak	
1980	Who's Singin' Over There?	Pevač (Singer)	
1981	The Falcon	Alija	Won Best Actor at Pula Film Festival
1981	Peacetime in Paris	Dragan	
1983	Nešto između	Marko	
1984	Unseen Wonder	Karuzo	
1985	Life Is Beautiful	Gara	
1988	Migrations	Pavel Isaković	
1989	Poslednji krug u Monci	Uroš "Urke"	
1989	The Meeting Point	Janko	
1991	The Original of the Forgery	Pavlović	
1992	Tito and Me	Gane's Father	
1994	Ni na nebu ni na zemlji	Igla	
1998	Cabaret Balkan	John's Boxer friend	
1998	Place Vendôme	Janoš	
1999	The Dagger	Hodža Valija Osmanović	
1999	Lovers	Zlatan	
1999	The White Suit	Makro	
2002	Labyrinth	Petar Aksentijević 'Pop'	
2004	The Robbery of the Third Reich	Glavonja	
2005	I Have Something Important to Tell You	Professor	
2007	The Fourth Man	Političar	
2007	The Simpsons Movie	Tom Hanks	Voice role Serbian-language version
2007–2011	Selo gori, a baba se češlja	Žota / Sudija Velibor	TV series (47 episodes)
2008–2009	Ranjeni orao	Ugleša Knežević	TV series (8 episodes)
2008	The Tour	Miško	
2008	Vratiće se rode	Mutavi	TV series (2 episodes)
2010	72 Days	Lone Shark	
2014	See You in Montevideo	Jules Rimet	
