= Art TV =

- File:ART-TV-logo.jpg

Serbia
- City: Belgrade

History
- Founded: December 1991
- First air date: July 31, 1992
- Last air date: October 31, 2016

Links
- Website: arttv.rs (defunct)

Art TV, headquartered in Belgrade on Vlade Kovačević Street in Senjak, was the first privately produced Serbian television program. Founded in December 1991 by Petar Pojć (director and technical manager), Andrija Pojić, and Milan Atanasković (artist, program director and Editor-in-chief), Art TV began broadcasting on July 31, 1992. Broadcasting continued until 2016 [1], with coverage spanning from the Belgrade metropolitan area, Vojvodina including Novi Sad, and several bigger towns in Serbia. Roughly 3,500,000 people were able to receive the program.

== The program ==
Art TV was conceived as a cultural channel, being the only such specialized program in the Yugoslavian territory. During the 1990s, amidst Serbian media content's ongoing devaluation, Art TV's program was important in preserving cultural values. Milan Atanasković created the program concept as an artistic work in progress, with culture and art as the medium. Art TV had newsrooms for film, music, art, theater, literature, science and authors program, along with dozens of permanent and part-time associates, editors, and authors of various shows including: Dragan Babić, Radoslav Rale Zelenović, Vladimir Jelenković, Miško Šuvaković, Maja Skovran, Miomir Grujić Fleka, Marina Stefanović, Ljiljana Pavlović, Draško Miletić, Dušan Varda, Dragana Kanjevac, Andrej Aćin, Ljubomir Vučkovic, Ljiljana Sađilj, Maša Mileusnic, Ljiljana Simić, Zorica Milivojević, Jasmina Ninkov, Radoslav Pušić, Vuk Bojović, Goran Malić, Vladimir Đurić, Milan Delčić "Delča", Aleksandar Jerkov, Boško Milin, Zoran Bogdanović, Ivon Jafali, Dragana Šarić, Milica Ivanović, Vlada Jelić, Jovan Bojanić, Mira Tomić, Aleksandar Radivojević, Nenad Bekvalac, Voki Kostic, Zoran Bogdanović, Dejan Jelača and many others.

Art TV hosted famous films, Art Cinema, and thematic shows. These included: Art Theater by Ljiljana Pavlovic, a show about classical music Fantasy by Marina Stefanovic, Video Glossary of 20th Century Art by Miško Šuvaković, Panotikum, Shock Corridor, Cult Detectives, Line EX, Passport Geography, The actor is Actor and many others.

From 1995 to 2000, under the direction of Milan Atanasković, Art TV hosted the work and programs of the cult art club Akademija at the Faculty of Fine Arts in Belgrade. Art TV further worked alongside the Faculty of Dramatic Arts, the Library of the City of Belgrade, the Kolarac Endowment, FEST, BITEF, and many other cultural institutions and events.

== Production ==
In the 1990s, Art TV was the only private television with a live broadcast vehicle and other production and technical capacities, such as an up-link for satellite broadcasting. With this, Art TV frequently aired live broadcasts of important cultural and artistic events, concerts, and festivals. Other television stations, productions and artists used these capacities, leveraging Art TV's financial independence. Throughout its time, Art TV remained internally funded via marketing and production. Prominent managers were the director of the production Danijela Jevtić and the director of marketing Mileva Mijatović.

== History ==
The program's broadcast started from a house on Senjak, Belgrade's library department was also located at that time. Dedicated exclusively to art and culture, Art TV immediately attracted a large cultural and intellectual interest. However, government authorities did not support the new cultural channel. Over the years, Art TV expanded its broadcasting network with great efforts and maintained a high program content level using alternative internal funding methods. The programs' participants were almost all-important cultural representatives, artists, and creators who had little or no media coverage from other sources during that period. During the great social crises and disintegration of the Yugoslav community in the 1990s, Art TV was the only media protector of art and culture.

During the NATO bombing in 1999, after the destruction of the RTS city studio and the death of sixteen employees, Art TV broadcast the national television program until the broadcast was re-established.

In the second half of its existence, new market conditions and a large departure of the editorial staff forced Art TV to reduce its programming gradually. Until the closure, Art TV remained staffed with four full-time employees and five part-time associates, financed from the previous 25 years' revenues. As the director, Sladjana Pojić, pointed out, the shutdown was due to a bad financial situation and the house's debts. [2]

In 2004, former editor-in-chief Milan Atanasković and Slobodan Atanasković launched an alternative international satellite program from Paris, specializing in video-art known as "Art Channel", later O Art TV. Art Channel broadcast on Eutelsat satellites and French and European networks. From 2011 on, oart.tv became available online.

== Awards ==
Art TV received the Golden Award of Belgrade in 2001 for a lasting contribution to culture and has further received numerous recognitions and letters of thanks.

Last program was aired on 31 October 2016, then television shuts down after 25 years of operation.
