= Povratak otpisanih =

- The original promo poster
- Created by: Dragan Marković
- Based on: Otpisani by; Dragan Marković; Siniša Pavić; Zabranjeni život (Beograd 1941–1944) by Dragan Marković
- Starring: Pavle Vuisić; Dragan Nikolić; Voja Brajović; Zlata Petković; Stevo Žigon
- Country of origin: SFR Yugoslavia
- No. of seasons: 1
- No. of episodes: 13 (List of episodes)

Production
- Running time: 55 minutes

Original release
- Network: TV Belgrade
- Release: January 1 – March 26, 1978

Povratak otpisanih (Serbian Cyrillic: Повратак отписаних, lit. 'The Return of the Written Offs') is a 1978 Yugoslav television series, sequel of the 1974 drama series Otpisani.

Povratak otpisanih continues the storyline from the first part, following the underground group of Belgrade resistance fighters led by Tihi (Voja Brajović) and Prle (Dragan Nikolić). It was filmed between 1976 and 1977 and first broadcast on 1 January 1978. Like its predecessor Otpisani, it had 13 episodes that were subsequently remastered into a feature film. Both series were directed by Aleksandar Đorđević. Dragan Marković and Gordan Mihić wrote the script for the sequel, Mihić replacing Siniša Pavić who worked on the first part. While the original series was shot in black and white, the sequel was recorded in color.

Otpisani and Povratak otpisanih have been described as one among the best television series recorded in Serbo-Croatian in the 1970s, along with Kuda idu divlje svinje and Pozorište u kući, and one among best of all times. Its success and long-term cultural influence has been ascribed to canons of film noir, and elements of modern urban humor and jargon, rather than ideological rigidity typical for the Partisan film genre.

== Plot ==
In the autumn in 1944, Prle and Tihi, still young, but by now veterans of the resistance movement together with Joca, old and moody radio operator, arrive with a radio station in Belgrade, the capital of Yugoslavia, still occupied by the Nazi Germans, and remain in it until the liberation. As the victorious Partisan forces are approaching, Prle, Tihi, and Joca must continue their work in the underground, in order to prepare the city for liberation.

== Main cast ==
- Pavle Vuisić as Joca
- Dragan Nikolić as Prle
- Voja Brajović as Tihi
- Zlata Petković as Marija
- Aleksandar Berček as Mrki
- Stevo Žigon as German officer Kriger
- Vasa Pantelić as Krsta Mišić
