= Selo gori, a baba se češlja =

- Created by: Radoš Bajić
- Starring: Season 4 cast: Dragan Nikolić; Radoš Bajić; Milorad Mandić; Nenad Okanović; Olga Odanović; Ljiljana Stjepanović; Mirko Babić; Lazar Ristovski
- Country of origin: Serbia
- No. of seasons: 6
- No. of episodes: 101

Production
- Executive producer: Nedeljko Bajić
- Running time: 50 minutes

Original release
- Network: RTS1
- Release: 10 March 2007 – 7 January 2017

Selo gori, a baba se češlja (English: The Village Is Burning, while the Grandmother Is Combing Her Hair) is a Serbian television series, which first aired in 2007.

The show quickly gained national fame with episodes in its third season averaging approximately 2.9 million viewers.

The show aired on the Serbian public broadcaster RTS1.

Although the end of the series was announced in 2011, in the closing credits of Season 5's finale, a sixth season consisting of 12 episodes premiered from 15 October 2016 - 7 January 2017.

== Overview ==
=== Premise ===
The show revolves around the character of Radašin. The entire story is based around his recount of the time when he lived in the village and how he spent his time with his fellow countrymen and women. He recounts his life to his family. Most of the show revolves around Radašin’s family and friends, some of which being the main characters of the show: Dragojlo, Đoda and Žota, his brother-by-grandmothers-lineage Milašin and his nephew, Dragan.

=== Plot ===
The series is based in a small fictional village near the region of the municipality of Trstenik, where South and West Morava rivers form the Great Morava river. The show is essentially a comedy but it displays a deep emotional connection between family, tradition and the land. The village life is at the heart of the show, often displaying how life is changing in Serbian villages and how these rural communities are quickly disappearing due to the exodus of young people from the country to the city.

The show emphasises that the village is the heart of Serbian culture and pride, a place where humanity has outlasted many challenges. The show further emphasises the finest qualities of the Serbian people such as honesty and kindness and aims to break down the tarnished stereotypical view of Serbian people crafted during the 1990s.

The show also briefly touches on various problems, which senior citizens and Serbian society as a whole were facing throughout the 2000s, such as the remaining societal transition from socialism to democratic capitalism and how some people are unable to cope with the breakup of Yugoslavia, whilst still often referencing their past, how older people deal with their health and often neglect it, how many young people mistreat their older relatives and flee from their own country into the diaspora to search for a better life, whilst the local economy and the country as a whole is falling apart and how corruption is a major problem in state institutions, such as the police. The show also touches on the question on how to deal with the loss of relatives and friends, which is due to them either passing away or fleeing into the diaspora to search for a better life and it briefly mentions the still unresolved ethnic tensions in Bosnia as a result of the breakup of Yugoslavia.

=== Breast cancer awareness ===
The show was largely praised for its breast cancer awareness campaign. During season three, one of the main characters of the show, Radojka, is diagnosed with breast cancer. The storyline was based around the director's own experience with breast cancer when his wife was diagnosed. The breast cancer storyline led to an extreme increase in the number of breast cancer screenings in regional parts of Serbia. Shortly after the storyline, a mobile mammography van was deployed to various villages across the country so women could be screened.

== Production ==
The first season of "Selo gori, a baba se češlja" began airing on 10 March 2007 on RTS1. The first season had only 4 episodes which were immensely popular mostly due to the famous cast which took part in the series. The first episode was watched by 2.1 million people, an extremely high figure for a debuting show. However, by the time series 2 began airing (on January 19, 2008), the show recorded massive viewer ratings. The second season contained a total of 25 episodes. The much anticipated third season of the show was aired from December 2008 to a massive television audience. The second episode of the third season was watched by over 3 million people making it one of the most watched programmes ever broadcast in Serbia. Ratings somewhat declined by the end of the third season (mostly due to the beginning of summer when television ratings generally fall) but they still remained strong with average viewing of 2.9 million people, which is extremely high for Serbian television.

"Selo gori, a baba se češlja" is aired once per week. Despite its impressive ratings, which has allowed it to carry the title of the most watched scripted television show in Serbia, the director and screenwriter Radoš Bajić announced that the show's fourth season will be its last. The fourth season was filmed from 20 August 2009 to April 2010, while the show aired from January 16, 2010. It has 33 episodes. The fourth and final season is made up of 2 parts, with the first part airing from January 2010 until May 2010 and the second airing from November 2010 until May 2011.

By the end of the third season "Selo gori, a baba se češlja" has 55 episodes plus 1 special episode which was aired prior to the beginning of the third season, showing the making of the series as well exclusive interviews with the cast and crew.

The show was mostly filmed in Kragujevac and Central Serbia, specifically the geographical region of Šumadija.

== Cast ==
Actor	Role
Dragan Nikolić	Judge Velibor/Žota
Radoš Bajić	Radašin
Milorad Mandić Manda	Milašin (Mila)
Nenad Okanović	Dragan
Mirko Babić	Dragojlo
Svetislav Goncić	Džama
Miroljub Trošić	Đoda(1948-2020)
Ljiljana Stjepanović	Radojka
Olga Odanović	Zlatana
Suzana Mančić	Svetlana
Nada Blam	Smiljana
Nedeljko Bajić	Radoslav
Suzana Petričević	Cveta
Ana Sakić	Ingrid
Nikola Kojo	Colonel Krga

== Ratings ==
"Selo gori, a baba se češlja" is the most watched scripted drama on Serbian television. Its third season’s fourth episode was the most watched with 3.014.000 viewers, setting a viewership record in Serbian broadcasting television. The average rating of an episode is 34% or 2.9 million viewers. The show has an average share of 68%.

Seasonal rankings (based on average total viewers per episode) of Selo gori, a baba se češlja on RTS1:

Season	Timeslot	Season Premiere	Season Finale	TV Season	Season rank	Average viewers (in millions)
1	Saturday 8:05PM	March 10, 2007	March 31, 2007	2006–2007	#3	2.6
2	Saturday 8:05PM	January 19, 2008	June 7, 2008	2007–2008	#2	2.7
3	Saturday 8:05PM	December 20, 2008	June 20, 2009	2008–2009	#1	2.9
4^{a}	Saturday 8:05PM	January 16, 2010	May 2010	2009–2010	TBD	2.5 (so far)
5	Saturday 8:05PM	November 6, 2010	April 2, 2011	2010–2011		
6	Saturday 8:05PM	October 15, 2016	January 7, 2017	2016		

Episode	Name	Airdate	Viewers	Rating (%)
SEASON FOUR
4.1	Šuma	Saturday January 16, 2010	2.358.400	33,5%
4.2	Koma	Saturday January 23, 2010	2.654.080	37,7%
4.3	Pukotine	Saturday January 30, 2010	2.386.560	33,9%
4.4	Budjenje	Saturday February 6, 2010	2.513.280	35,7%
4.5	Prinova	Saturday February 13, 2010	2.485.120	35,3%
4.6	Odluka	Saturday February 20, 2010	2.590.720	36,8%
4.7	Bekstvo	Saturday February 27, 2010	2.548.480	36,2%
4.8	Srna	Saturday March 6, 2010	2.548.480	36,2%
4.9	Ženeva	Saturday March 13, 2010	2.513.280	35,7%
4.10	Gubitnik	Saturday March 20, 2010	2.597.760	36,9%
4.11	Gas	Saturday March 27, 2010	2.288.000	32,5%
4.12	Sveta Petka	Saturday April 3, 2010	2.520.320	35,8%
4.13	Jovan	Saturday April 10, 2010	2.520.320	35,8%
4.14	Suze	Saturday April 17, 2010	2.106.000	29,8%
4.15	Spomenica	Saturday April 24, 2010	2.034.559	28,9%
4.16	Sreća	Saturday May 1, 2010	1.760.000	25.0%
4.17	Duvanište	Saturday May 8, 2010	1.837.440	26,1%

Note: All ratings are based on the AGB Nielsen Media Research

== International broadcast ==
The show was also aired in other former Yugoslav states, such as Montenegro, Bosnia and Herzegovina, North Macedonia and Croatia.

In 2010, a Slovenian production house bought rights to produce a local version of the show titled "Naj ti krava crkne".

The show was scheduled to premier in 2011 and it was supposed to consist of 30 episodes.

However the show never came into reality and not a single episode has been released to this day.

== Awards ==
=== 2008 ===
- Best couple in a television series: Radoš Bajić and Ljiljana Stjepanović
- Best television show of 2008
- Oskar Popularnosti Award for most watched television show of 2008

=== 2009 ===
- Manager of the year in television or film production: Radoš Bajić
- Best television creation: Radoš Bajić
- Best actor in a supporting role: Mirko Babić

== Movie ==
In 2009, a movie was released based on the show. Entitled ”Selo gori ... i tako” (The village is burning ... and so on). The entire cast from the show appeared in the film which was mostly based on the series third season. Internationally, the film will be shown for the first time at the 2010 Serbian Film Festival in Australia in October 2010.

Awards
Preceded by Ranjeni orao	Serbian Oscar Of Popularity; TV Series of the Year; 2010	Succeeded by TBD
