= Zlata Petković =

Yugoslav and Serbian actress (1954–2012)

- Злата Петковић
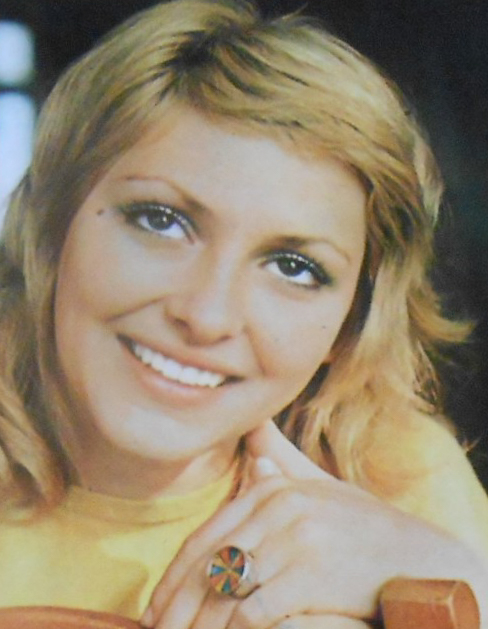
- Petković in 1971
- Born: 11 February 1954; Svrljig, PR Serbia, Yugoslavia
- Died: 3 December 2012 (aged 58); Belgrade, Serbia
- Occupation: Actress
- Years active: 1969–2012
- Spouse: Sanja Ilić
- Children: 2

Zlata Petković (Serbian Cyrillic: Злата Петковић; 11 February 1954 – 3 December 2012) was a Yugoslav and Serbian actress, model, television host, singer and beauty pageant titleholder. She was Miss Yugoslavia 1971 and is best known for her role as Marija in the 1970s Yugoslav television series Povratak otpisanih.

== Early life ==
Zlata Petković was the daughter of Borislav and Milica. Her parents, who lived in Niš at the time, were visiting Zlata's grandmother Nadica in the small town Svrljig when Milica went into labor. It was February 1954, and the roads were closed due to a snowstorm, so her parents could not return to Niš. Petković was born in Svrljig. As a result of her fathers job as an economist, her parents moved often and young Zlata would stay with her grandmother. She recalled that during this time, her grandmother Nadica taught her how to cook. Zlata had a younger brother named Dejan (born 1958).

Her parents divorced after her mother wished to settle in Belgrade, while her father wanted to stay in his hometown of Niš.

== Career ==
In Belgrade, Petković signed on to a music competition for young singers. Director Milan Jelić noticed her and offered her a role in his film Bubašinter (The Bug Killer). The film was released 19 July 1971. She later recalled "I loved music and I thought I would be a singer, then the first music competition in which I participated completely changed my life. I was offered a movie role."

In 1969, after the music competition, journalists nominated Petković for the "Miss Bambi" competition, organized by the then-popular magazine "Chick". Petković won the first competition in 1969, and the following year a competition for "Miss Teenage Yugoslavia" was held in Zagreb. She won and competed in the world championship in Tokyo, where she claimed the title of "Miss Photogenic". Petković triumphed at the Miss Yugoslavia beauty pageant in 1971. As Miss Yugoslavia, she went to London, where she was a contestant in the 1971 Miss World pageant. In the British capital she met many people from the world of show business and gave an interview for the famous TV network BBC.

Soon she started working as a TV announcer in Belgrade, where she remained until she moved to Zagreb to attend the Academy of Dramatic Art, University of Zagreb. During her time at the academy, she fell in love and had a son named Gvozden. She graduated in 1976 and was offered the role of Marija in the television series Povratak otpisanih, which became her best-known role.

She starred in multiple films during the 1970s and 1980s. Her career slowed down in her later years but she still had several roles in popular television shows such as Selo gori, a baba se češlja.

== Personal life ==
Aged 19, Petković had a son named Gvozden in July 1973 with her first husband that she met while attending a dramatic arts academy in Zagreb. She later was married to Sanja Ilić, composer and keyboardist, who was the front man of the 1970s Yugoslav rock band San. Together they had a son named Andrej in 1984.

== Death ==
On 22 November 2012, Petković suffered a stroke in her apartment. She was operated on 30 November, but died three days later aged 58. She was buried on 6 December 2012 in Belgrade's Novo groblje cemetery.
