= Pilatovci, Nikšić =

Coordinates: 42°51′22.7″N 18°31′3.0″E

Pilatovci Пилатовци
- Village
- Location within Montenegro
- Country: Montenegro
- Municipality: Nikšić

Population (2011)
  - Total: 128
- Time zone: UTC+1 (CET)
  - Summer (DST): UTC+2 (CEST)

Pilatovci (Serbian Cyrillic: Пилатовци) is a village in the municipality of Nikšić, Montenegro.

== Demographics ==
According to the 2011 census, its population was 128.

Ethnicity in 2011
| Ethnicity | Number | Percentage |
|---|---|---|
| Montenegrins | 68 | 53.1% |
| Serbs | 50 | 39.1% |
| other/undeclared | 10 | 7.8% |
| Total | 128 | 100% |
