= Helmi (given name) =

Estonian, Finnish, Indonesian and Malay name

- Gender: Male/female

Origin
- Origin: Estonian, Finnish
- Meaning: "pearl", "bead"; originally "amber"

Other names
- Related names: William, Wilhelmina, Vilhelmiina, Vilhelmina

Helmi is a given name. It is an Estonian and Finnish feminine given name literally meaning pearl or bead. The name is derived from the Proto-Baltic-Finnic *helmes, or 'amber'. In Finland, Helmi is also used as a short form of the name Vilhelmiina or Vilhelmina. Helmi was among the most popular names for baby girls born in Finland in the early 21st century.

It is also used as a masculine name with differing origins in Indonesia and Malaysia.

== Estonian/Finnish ==
- Helmi Arneberg-Pentti (1889–1981), chairman of Lotta Svärd, Finnish auxiliary organisation for women in 1920s.
- Helmi Juvonen (1903–1985), American artist active in Seattle, Washington
- Helmi Krohn (1871–1967), Finnish writer
- Helmi Kurrik (1883–1960), Estonian ethnographer
- Helmi Mäelo (1898–1978), Estonian writer and social activist
- Helmi Raijas (born 2005), Finnish footballer
- Helmi Puur (1936–2014), Estonian ballerina
- Helmi Üprus (1911–1978), Estonian architectural and art historian

== Other nationalities ==
- Eddy Helmi Abdul Manan (born 1979), Malaysian footballer
- Helmi Johannes (born 1961), Indonesian television newscaster and executive producer
- Khairul Helmi Johari (born 1988), Malaysian footballer
- Mohd Helmi Eliza Elias (born 1983), Malaysian footballer

== See also ==
- Helmy
- Hilmi
