= Helmi Kurrik =

Estonian ethnographer (1883–1960)

- Born: 9 January 1883; Dorpat, Governorate of Livonia, Russian Empire
- Died: 13 July 1960 (aged 77); Palo Alto, California, United States
- Citizenship: Estonia; United States
- Education: University of Tartu
- Occupation: Ethnographer
- Years active: 1928–1944
- Era: World War I, Estonian War of Independence
- Employer: Estonian National Museum
- Known for: Estonian folk art, cultural preservation
- Notable work: Estonian Folk Costumes (1938)
- Father: Juhan Kurrik
- Awards: Order of the Three Stars; Order of the Lithuanian Grand Duke Gediminas

Helmi Kurrik (/ˈhɛlmi ˈkuːrɪk/ HEL-mee-KOOR-ik; 9 January 1883 – 13 July 1960) was an Estonian ethnographer and expert on Estonian folk costumes. After earning her private tutor's certificate in 1900, she worked as a tutor in Russia, Finland, and France for a decade before returning home. Upon returning to Estonia, she worked from 1911 to 1914 as a French and German teacher at the Valga Commercial School. During the First World War and the Estonian War of Independence she worked in Tartu as a nurse, and from the early 1920s as a clerical worker at the Tartu Observatory. Midway through her career, she retrained as an ethnographer and began promoting the Estonian national folk costume and Estonian food culture, working alongside the Estonian National Museum. She was Estonia's first female ethnographer to receive a master's degree and defended her thesis on the topic of blood used in the preparation of food (such as blood sausages).

== Early life and education ==
Kurrik was born on 9 January 1883, although some documents state 28 December 1882, referring to the period prior to Estonia's switch from the Julian calendar to the Gregorian. She was born in Tartu as the second of six children to schoolmaster and nationalist Juhan Kurrik and his wife Wilhelmine Margareta Elisabet Kurrik (née Wieleberg). Her baptism took place at St. Mary's Congregation in Tartu. Her older brother was Voldemar Kurrik (1878–1925). Her other siblings that followed were, in order, Aleksander Kurrik (1884–1948), Johannes Kurrik (1887–1954), Elly Kurrik (1889–1981), and Konstantin Kurrik (1891–1980). Her father was a schoolteacher and his salary was meager when it came to supporting a family of eight.

Some of the information regarding her qualifications is disputed. There is a chance she may have graduated from M. von Müller's Girls' Secondary School in 1900. However, she may have sat examinations before the Saint Petersburg School District Committee in the same year which enabled her to graduate with enough qualifications to become a language tutor. Most of Kurrik's education had a Russian basis and any activities promoting Estonian nationalism as most education took place in Russian and any local activities that would have alluded to an Estonian nationalism were prohibited since Estonia was colonised by the Russian Empire at the time.

She studied from 1925 to 1935 at the University of Tartu, graduating cum laude and received her master's of philosophy in 1938 or 1939. She passed her examination, although her reviewers critiqued the inordinate amount of focus on sausages in the thesis.

While preparing for the examination, she had concurrently been working on compiling materials for her work on folk costumes and also had been in poor health. This was in part attributed to anxiety and exhaustion, however she had been diagnosed with meningitis in 1937. In 1938, she was also diagnosed with high blood pressure. Her anxiety and tiredness was attributed to her work on the book Eesti rahvarõivad ('Estonian folk costumes') The book had been commissioned in 1936 by the state with Kurrik and Ferdinand Linnus appointed as compilers. Kurrik and Linnus had worked together as members of the Folk Costume Commission established in 1934. Together Kurrik and Linnus also worked on the newly established magazine Taluperenaine (lit. 'female farm head' or 'landlady of the farm'). The book had a tight deadline as it was aimed to be completed in honour of the song festival and the 20th anniversary of the Estonian republic in 1938.

She defended her master's degree in the field of ethnography in 1938 or 1939 with the thesis Blood in Food Economy. Kurrik was the first woman to finish her master's degree in ethnography in Estonia as two other women, Ella Koern and Aita Hanko gained their master's in the field a few years later, in 1942. Female contemporaries of Kurrik, besides Koern and Hanko, working in the field of ethnography in Estonia were Helmi Reiman-Neggo, Aliise Moora, and Helmi Üprus.

== Career ==
=== Early career (1900–1920) ===
After gaining her credentials, she worked as a home-based tutor. She taught in Finland, France, and Russia, and then, after over a decade abroad, she returned home. Upon returning to Estonia, she taught German and French at the Valga Commercial School. During World War I and the Estonian War of Independence, she became employed as a nurse at Tartu Red Cross Hospital. She quit her job at the hospital in 1920.

=== Tartu Observatory (1920–1928) ===
Her brother Voldemar was working at Tartu Observatory as a meteorologist and helped her secure work there as a human computer. The observatory was acquired by the University of Tartu in May of 1924. Kurrik continued her work at the observatory following the university acquisition, but was reclassified as a university clerical employee. In 1927, she was promoted to a senior role as a clerical employee. During this period, in 1925, she began studying Romance philology and ethnography at the University of Tartu. She studied under associate professor Ilmari Manninen, while Arno Rafael Cederberg's methodological approaches influenced her research.

=== Estonian National Museum (1928–1944) ===
She left her clerical role at the university's Tartu Observatory in 1928 to take up a role at the Estonian National Museum. As part of her work with the museum, she curated exhibitions on Estonian folk art in Helsinki and Brussels in 1929, Berlin and Vilnius in 1930, Riga in 1933, and Paris in 1935. She worked to get a number of items of national ethnographic value to the museum, including a large private collection held by Aleksander Põrga.

Her research with the national museum focused on cultural food economy and Estonian folk textiles, with Kurrik's primary research area being the later, a field in which she was one of the main experts at the time. She served as the head of the department of ethnography at the museum from 1931 onward. In 1938, she connected the Folk Costume Advisory Bureau to the Estonian National Museum, which provided consultation on traditional attire. She was involved in a series of public media engagements, in the format of magazine articles, radio presentations, and lectures to promote Estonian folk clothing. Her efforts were part of a broader movement promoting and preserving folk clothing in Estonia. Her articles were published in both the general press and specialised publications like Taluperenaine.

=== Departure and work with displaced persons camp hospitals (1944) ===
In 1944, Kurrik fled to Germany, along with her sister Elly (1889–1981). The sisters worked as nurses in hospitals in displaced persons camps in Bad Rehburg, Hannover, and Oldenburg.

By the 1950s, Kurrik was in her late sixties. Her sister Elly found work in the United States following the war. In 1951, the sisters moved to the United States. Kurrik initially lived in Fresno, before relocating to Palo Alto.

Helmi Kurrik in the summer of 1956 at Yosemite National Park in California, U.S.

Since she had begun her research into ethnography mid-career, she chose not to continue her research work after seeking refugee status in the United States. However, she was an active member of the refugee community of Estonians. She still continued to share her knowledge about folk culture among the diaspora community in California.

Helmi Kurrik at her house in Fresno, California, U.S.

== Selected publications ==
The title page for the book Eesti rahvarõivad by Helmi Kurrik

Kurrik's publication list is long, despite her late entry into academia in her forties.

Kurrik was closely affiliated with the state campaign in the 1930s to spread knowledge about the construction of traditional Estonian folk costumes, as to instill a sense of national spirit in Estonians by teaching them how to make their own folk clothing. She was one of the more prominent members of the Estonian National Museum working to create a popular culture and movement for traditional Estonian folk clothing. Her most well-known writing on the topic was her state commissioned 1938 publication Estonian Folk Costumes which had an initial print run of 6,500 copies. The book is Kurrik's magnum opus and has been considered to be one of the essential guides when examining folk costumes within Estonia. It is still in high demand in bookstores in Estonia today.

The publication contains practical advice as well as descriptions that are more "colloquial" in nature. Kurrik studied a number of museum pieces to document how folk outfits were constructed. Kurrik's research on folk dress prioritised general regional types over that of parishes. This permitted some flexibility in clothing characteristics like skirt colours or embroidery. In focusing on regional dress forms and sets, Kurrik's book gave dress designers more creative freedom so long as it stayed within the traditional structure. However, her approach did lead to more strict standards for sets as she promoted the idea that there were correct ways to wear traditional Estonian folk clothing.

She worked to compile information about historic folk clothing with the intention that new pieces could be produced. She worked on this in her role as a member of the Folk Clothing Commission. Kurrik's book has been used as a guide by national dance groups for their costumes.

During the Soviet occupation, direct references to Kurrik's work were prohibited because following the Soviet reoccupation of Estonia in 1944, authorities banned literature linked to the Republic of Estonia during the pre-war period, so indirect references were made by other authors. (Note: Kurrik's work on Estonian folk culture, and that of her contemporaries such as Aliise Moora, faced suppression because the Soviet regime viewed expressions of national identity, and therefore folk heritage studies, as ideological threats to the state.) Researchers and state institutions used Kurrik's material and it remained a definitive technical guide for Estonian textiles. A publication in the 1950s, for instance, heavily referenced and excerpted her instructions, but it would not have been possible to state her book as the source under the Soviet regime due to censorship.

Her background as an ethnographer has been cited as justification for her ability to expound on folk costumes with nuance. She made generalisations that were useful for the average person looking for concise advise when making their own folk dress.

Kurrik's other research area was food culture, which was the topic of her master's in ethnography. In 1929, she published an article on kama, followed by a study on sausages in 1932. (Note: Titled Kama (a type of barley grain usually prepared as a yogurt porridge) and Sausages respectively, the articles were published as part of the Estonian National Museum Yearbook journal.) She continued to write about folk culture and food through the 1930s.

== Awards ==
For her services to cultural cooperation, she was awarded the Latvian Order of Three Stars in 1936 and the Order of the Lithuanian Grand Duke Gediminas in the same year. (Note: As announced in Postimees, on February 6, 1937, no. 36 on p. 7.) She also received the Book Fund's First Prize for her work on Estonian folk costumes in 1939.

== Death and legacy ==
Kurrik died in Palo Alto, California in 1960. She died in relative obscurity. Researchers have noted that she is not as well known as male ethnographers of her time, such as Ilmari Manninen, Gustav Ränk or Ferdinand Linnus, perhaps due in part to her modesty.

Her sister, Elly, who had fled with her, eventually left the United States, a little while after Kurrik's death to go and stay with family in Germany in 1970. Just over a decade later, Elly donated her inheritance from Kurrik to the Estonian diaspora community in Sweden, which included 14 volumes of materials. These items were later handed over to the Baltic Archives.

The Helmi Kurrik auditorium located on the first floor of the A-wing at the Estonian National Museum is named after her. The Estonian National Museum has also made access to some of her works available as part of their digital collection due to popular demand.
