= Helmi =

Helmi may refer to:

- Helmi (given name)
- Helmi (surname)
- Helmi Technologies, previously Visualway Design, designers of web-based applications and sites
- Helmi stream, stellar stream
- Helmi Sport, Lebanese football club
- 183635 Helmi, minor planet

== See also ==
- Helmy (disambiguation)
