= Jalska Mosque =

Mosque in Tuzla, Bosnia and Herzegovina

- Jalska džamija
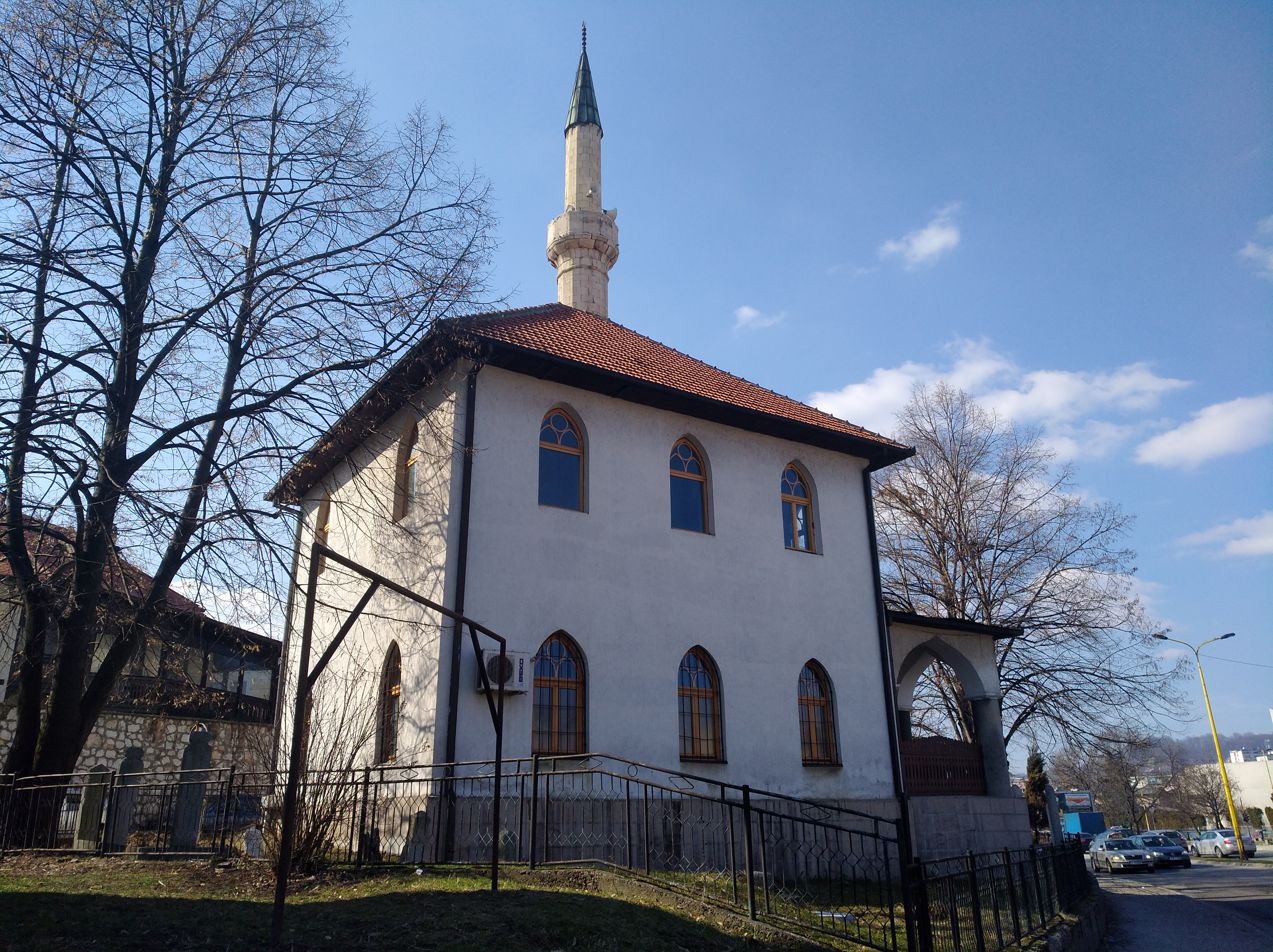

- Location of the mosque in Bosnia and Herzegovina

Religion
- Affiliation: Islam
- Ecclesiastical or organizational status: Mosque
- Status: Active

Location
- Location: Tuzla, Tuzla Canton, Federation of Bosnia and Herzegovina
- Country: Bosnia and Herzegovina
- Interactive map of Jalska Mosque
- Coordinates: 44°32′14″N 18°40′24″E

Architecture
- Type: Mosque
- Style: Ottoman
- Founder: Sedefkar Mehmed Agha
- Completed: 17th century

Specifications
- Dome: 1 (since collapsed)
- Minaret: 1

The Jalska Mosque (Bosnian: Jalska džamija) known also as the Kızler Mosque (from Turkish kızler-girls) or Hafiz-hanuma's Mosque, is a mosque located in Tuzla in Bosnia and Herzegovina. The mosque was completed in the 17th-century, during the Ottoman era.

== History ==
The building was mentioned for the first time in 1600 CE under the name of its founder Sedefkar Mehmed Agha. The grave of Mehmed Teufik Azabagić, Grand Muftis of Bosnia and Herzegovina between 1893 and 1909, is located next to the mosque.

According to folk belief, the mosque was named the Kızler Mosque because, at one point, a young girl restored it using her bridal attire. Her tomb was located in the mosque's courtyard in 1848. Over time, the mosque deteriorated, and in 1890, according to Tuzla residents, Hafiz-hanuma Tuzlić rebuilt it from the ground up, leading to its renaming as Hafiz-hanuma's Mosque.

The Jalska Mosque was originally built from adobe bricks, with a red dome covered with wooden planks until its renovation in 1891. Beneath the roof, there was a brick dome that collapsed on its own in 1928, after which a reed ceiling was installed, making the original dome no longer visible. The building was declared a National Monument of Bosnia and Herzegovina in February 2019.

== See also ==
- Islam in Bosnia and Herzegovina
- List of mosques in Bosnia and Herzegovina
- List of National Monuments of Bosnia and Herzegovina
- Church of the Dormition of the Theotokos, Tuzla
