= Džemaludin Čaušević =

4th Grand Mufti for Bosnia and Herzegovina from 1914 to 1930

Effendi Mehmed Džemaludin Čaušević
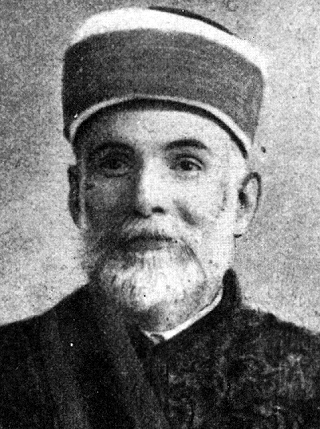
- Title: 4th Grand Mufti for Bosnia and Herzegovina

Personal life
- Born: 28 December 1870 Arapuša, Bosnia vilayet, Ottoman Empire
- Died: 28 March 1938 (aged 67) Sarajevo, Kingdom of Yugoslavia
- Resting place: Gazi Husrev-beg Mosque, Sarajevo
- Education: Istanbul University
- Occupation: Imam; grand mufti; translator; journalist; linguist

Religious life
- Religion: Sunni Islam

Senior posting
- Period in office: 26 March 1914 – 12 June 1930
- Predecessor: Sulejman Šarac
- Successor: Ibrahim Maglajlić (as Grand Mufti of Yugoslavia)

Mehmed Džemaludin ef. Čaušević (28 December 1870 – 28 March 1938) was a Bosnian cleric, thinker, educator, reformer, journalist, translator and linguist who served as the 4th Grand Mufti for Bosnia and Herzegovina from 1914 to 1930. He was one of the most significant and influential Bosnian Muslim personalities of the 20th century.

== Early life ==
Mehmed Džemaludin Čaušević was born in northwestern Bosnia, in the village of Arapuša, near Bosanska Krupa on 28 December 1870. His earliest education was obtained by his father, Ali Hodža, a member of the local Islamic clergy. As a teenager, Čaušević was enrolled into the madrasa of the nearby city of Bihać, where he attracted the attention of its foremost instructor, Mehmed Sabit Ribić (who was also the city’s Mufti).

== Education ==
Čaušević was sent to Constantinople at seventeen to receive a higher education in Islamic studies. While in the Ottoman capital, he finished his education in Islamic Studies with high marks and subsequently enrolled in the empire’s law school, the Mekteb-i Hukuk. He was first exposed to the ongoing modernization that had been instituted in the empire over the last several decades.

Sources indicate that during the summer months, a student at the 'Mekteb-i Hukuk', Čaušević would, upon invitation, travel back to Bosnia to speak at various venues. It was already apparent from his lectures at this time that he was receptive to notions of both religious and societal reform. Moreover, he spent some time in Cairo, where he intermittently attended the lectures of the famous Arab reformer Muhammad Abduh. These lectures appear to have had a considerable impact on Čaušević since he refers to Abduh in his later writings as Ustaz-i muhterem, “Respected Teacher.” Upon graduating from the Mekteb-i Hukuk, in 1901, Čaušević departed from Constantinople and returned to Bosnia.

== Return to Bosnia and Herzegovina ==
The turn of the 20th century was a period of significant cultural and political transformation within Bosnia and Herzegovina, and it was also a time when Čaušević emerged as an individual who was well-versed and capable in both traditional Islamic theology as well as modern science and thought. The Bosnian Muslim society struggled to endure the psychological anxiety of being ruled by traditionally antagonistic forces (both Austria and later, Serb-dominated Yugoslavia). As a result, tens of thousands of Bosnian Muslims abandoned their homeland, seeking refuge in hicret, or immigration, to lands still under Muslim rule.

This flight triggered alterations to Bosnia and Herzegovina's demographic make-up and a brain-drain on Bosnia and Herzegovina's Muslim society. At a time when it was popular for educated and religious people to leave their land for what was left of the Ottoman Empire, Čaušević instead abandonded his residency in Constantinople and returned to his homeland to assist it at a time when it was suffering immense and painful transformations, and when the continued existence of the Bosnian Muslim people came into serious question.

== Activities in Islam in Bosnia and Herzegovina ==
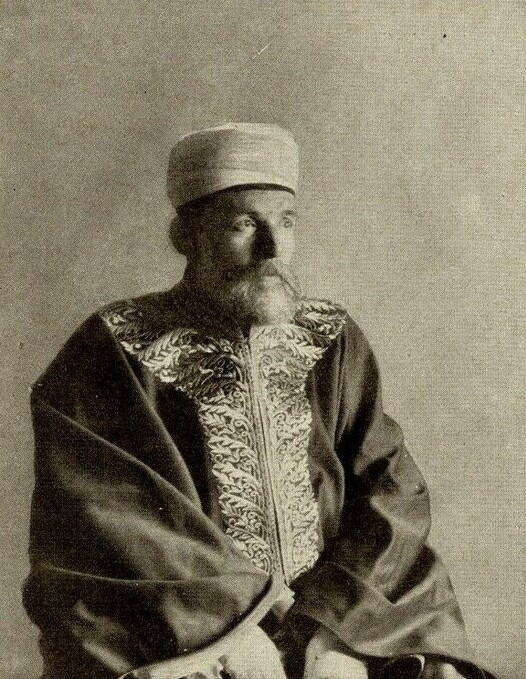
A portrait of Čaušević as Grand Mufti for Bosnia and Herzegovina, circa 1915

Making his residence in Sarajevo, Čaušević served as an instructor of the Arabic language in the city’s Great Gymnasium. In September 1903, he was elected to be a member of the distinguished Meclis-i Ulema, the managerial body of the Bosnia and Herzegovina Islamic Community. Following this appointment, Čaušević was made responsible for overseeing religious educational institutions and in this capacity, he travelled throughout Bosnia and Herzegovina to inspect the conditions of the country’s meqtabs ("schools") and madrases.

In 1909, Čaušević accepted a position as professor in Sarajevo’s Sharia school, an institution dedicated to higher Islamic learning and which was, built and financed by the Austrians. Always true to his reformist ideals, Čaušević never ceased to declare and strive to implement them. Soon his reputation for dedication and distinction in the field of education spread throughout Bosnia and Herzegovina, and when Hafiz Sulejman Šarac resigned from his position as Grand Mufti of Bosnia and Herzegovina in August 1912, Čaušević was selected to be his successor on 26 March 1914. Thus he was presented with the highest and most prestigious religious rank within the Islamic community of Bosnia-Hercegovina. He remained in that position until June 1930, when he resigned because of disagreements with the Yugoslav government over the administration of waqfs (Muslim charitable organisations) and religious positions in Yugoslavia.

Following his retirement, Čaušević continued to be an active participant in Islamic intellectual discourse through contributions to literary papers (some of which he established). Together with Hafiz Muhamed Pandža, he translated the Quran into Croatian language and attached his forward-looking exegesis to it.

Čaušević died in Sarajevo on 28 March 1938, at the age of 67.

== Legacy ==
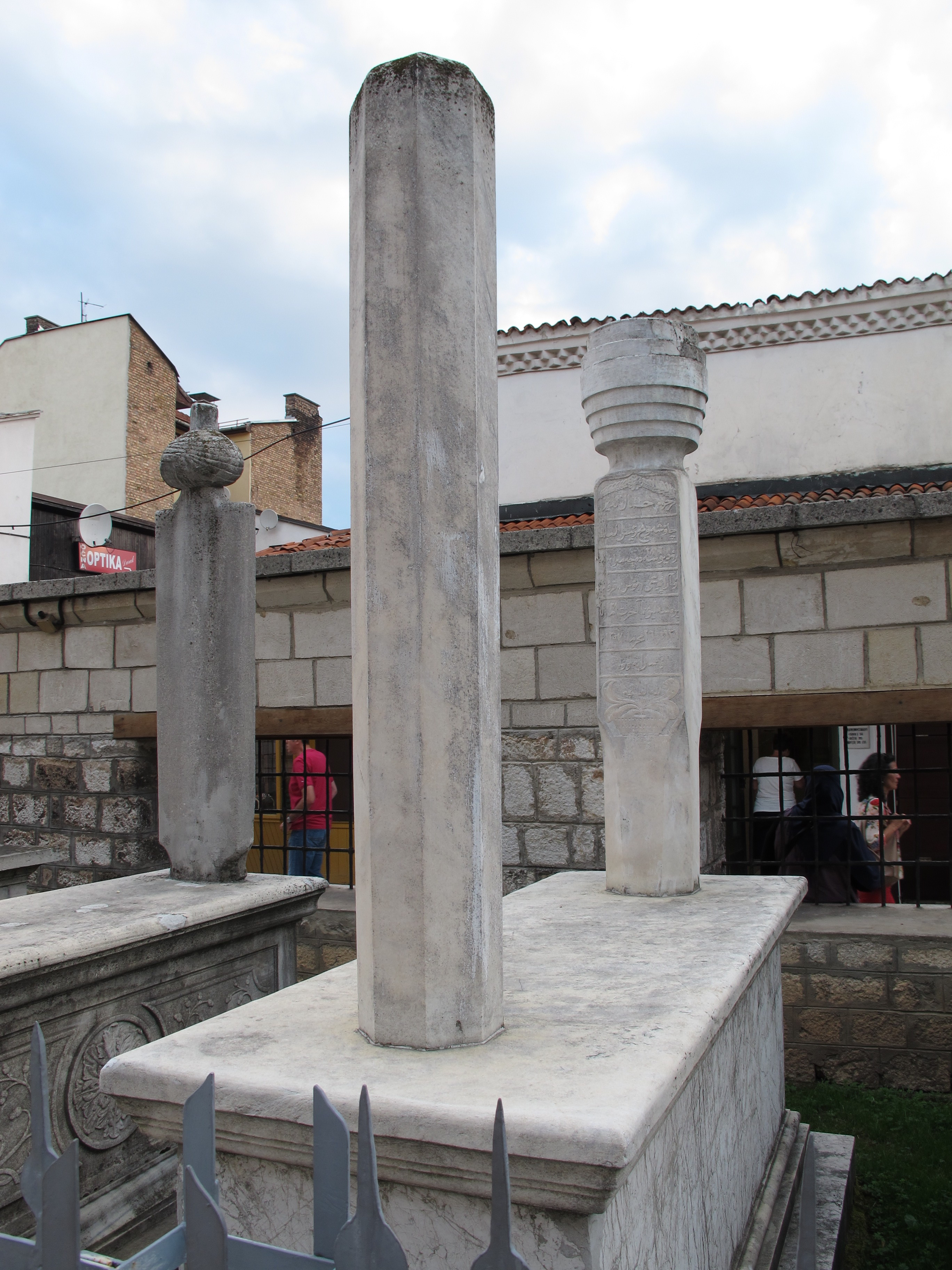
Čaušević's grave in Sarajevo

As with other Muslim reformers of his generation, Čaušević had the same objective in mind for his people, and he employed the same rhetoric and methodology: use of the printing press, allowing for women to uncover their faces, calling for educational reforms, etc. The rhetoric that he used was evocative of other reformist calls throughout the Muslim Middle East and Central Asia. He censured his fellow Muslims for having drifted into the “deep sleep” of apathy and defeatism:

“Muslims fell into a deep sleep, from which they were not able to wake up until the Europeans, with their weapons of knowledge and all sorts of inventions, came to the door of their house and demonstrated the divine truth: Knowledge and ignorance cannot be equal, knowledge always triumphs over ignorance.”

The focal point that reform and modernity evolved around for all Muslim reformers was knowledge; for “knowledge always triumphs over ignorance”, and they believed that Muslims must have fallen into ignorance, as the Europeans had triumphed over them. Now this knowledge (which the Muslims once possessed when they knew how to interpret the Quran correctly) had to be regained, and the Europeans, as well as other advanced nations, should be used as models for proficiency and advancement. Muslims needed to learn from Europe to regain the worldly wisdom they once possessed. Seeing that most of these reformers were sincere believers, they did not question the authenticity of the Quran, and in fact, they sought to reinterpret the Quran so that its real message became the search for knowledge, accompanied by moral and material enrichment.

== Sources ==
- Karić, Enes & Demirović, Mujo; Reis Džemaludin Čaušević: Prosvjetitelj i reformator. Ljiljan, Sarajevo, 2002.
- Traljić, Mahmud, Islamska Misao H. Mehmeda Džemaludina Čauševića. Rijaset Islamske Zajednice, Sarajevo, 1998.

Religious titles
Preceded by Sulejman Šarac	4th Grand Mufti for Bosnia and Herzegovina; 1914–1930	Succeeded by Ibrahim Maglajlić as Grand Mufti of Yugoslavia
