= Mehmed Teufik Azabagić =

2nd Grand Mufti for Bosnia and Herzegovina from 1893 to 1909

Effendi Mehmed Teufik Azabagić
- Title: 2nd Grand Mufti for Bosnia and Herzegovina

Personal life
- Born: 1838 Tuzla, Bosnia Eyalet, Ottoman Empire
- Died: 22 May 1918 (aged 79–80) Sarajevo, Kingdom of Serbs, Croats and Slovenes
- Resting place: Jalska Mosque, Tuzla
- Occupation: Imam; khatib; wa'iz; qadi; principal; grand mufti

Religious life
- Religion: Sunni Islam

Senior posting
- Period in office: 1893 – 1909
- Predecessor: Mustafa Hilmi Hadžiomerović
- Successor: Sulejman Šarac

Mehmed Teufik ef. Azabagić (1838 – 22 May 1918) was a Bosnian cleric who served as the Grand Mufti for Bosnia and Herzegovina from 1893 to 1909.

== Biography ==
He was born in Tuzla in 1838. Primary and secondary school he completed in hometown. Then he went to study Islamic sciences in Istanbul. He graduated in 1868 and returned to Bosnia and Herzegovina. He spoke Arabic, Turkish, Persian, German and Bosnian language.

During his working life he held the positions of imam, khatib and wa'iz. Also, Azapagić held important positions in the Islamic Community in Bosnia and Herzegovina. He was the principal of school of ruždija in Sarajevo, and then he was transferred to the same position in Tuzla, where he also held the position of qadi.

After the occupation of Bosnia and Herzegovina by Austria-Hungary in 1878, he was appointed mufti of Tuzla. After the establishment and opening of the Sharia School of Judges in 1887, he was transferred to Sarajevo and appointed as the first principal of this important religious and educational institution for Bosnian Muslims. He remained as principal and lecturer until 1893.

Mehmed Teufik ef. Azabagić held the position of Grand Mufti from 1893 to 1909. He was appointed on 25 October 1893, and the ceremonial handover of the menshura and enthronement took place on 20 November of the same year, at the Konak residence, after prayers in the Emperor's Mosque in Sarajevo.

It was a period of struggle for a better and fairer status of Bosnian Muslims. For their religious and religious-educational autonomy, which was led by Ali Fehmi ef. Džabić. By obtaining religious and religious-educational autonomy, the Bosnian Muslims prepared to adopt a new Statute and to elect a Grand Mufti according to it. Mehmed Teufik ef. Azabagić estimated that it would be best for him to retire, which he did in 1909. He lived the rest of his life in Tuzla.

He died at the age of 80 on May 22, 1918. He was buried in the cemetery of the Jalska Mosque in Tuzla.

== Works ==
While serving as the Mufti of Tuzla, he wrote the work Risala on Hijra. It was printed in the Vatan printing house in 1886. It was originally written in Arabic, but was later published in an abridged version in Turkish. It is an appeal to Bosniaks not to emigrate in Turkey from Bosnia and Herzegovina because of the Christian Austro-Hungarian authorities. This Azabagić's work was well received, highly regarded and recommended by the most prominent scholars of the time. In 2018, it was translated into English.

Religious titles
Preceded by Mustafa Hilmi Hadžiomerović	2nd Grand Mufti for Bosnia and Herzegovina; 1893–1909	Succeeded by Sulejman Šarac
