= Helmi Üprus =

Estonian art historian (1911-1978)

- Üprus, 1977
- Born: 15 October 1911; Fellin, Livonia, Russian Empire
- Died: 27 August 1978 (aged 66); Tallinn, then part of Estonian SSR, Soviet Union
- Occupations: Architectural and art historian
- Years active: 1936–1978

Helmi Üprus (15 October 1911 – 27 August 1978) was an Estonian architectural and art historian. She trained in Romance languages, studied English and ethnography, and earned a master's degree in art history from the University of Tartu in 1936. She worked her way up to head the cultural history department of the Estonian National Museum, where she researched folk art. In 1947, she began working at the Institute of History of the Academy of Sciences of the Estonian SSR. Persecuted by Stalinism she lost her job in 1950 and worked in a factory until Stalin's death. From 1953, she was the chief specialist in architecture and history for the government monument restoration service.

Üprus analyzed architecture employing an interdisciplinary method, which looked at both functional use and natural features in regard to construction and cultural significance. Although under Khrushchev's regime preservation and restoration were not a priority, her comprehensive work to uncover the architectural history of the medieval town center of Tallinn and develop a conservation plan, was eventually adopted in 1966. Her plan called for preservation and conservation of historic buildings, zoning to meet the needs of the local community, and limiting traffic and tourism. It was the first legislatively protected preservation area in the USSR and became a model for later conservation projects throughout the Soviet republics. She was honored twice – 1967 and 1980 – with the Prize of Soviet Estonia for publications on the history of Estonian art and architecture and was awarded the 1974 prize of the Estonian Association of Art Scientists and Curators (Estonian: Eesti Kunstiteadlaste ja Kuraatorite Ühing). In 1975 and 1977, along with other authors, she received the State Prize of the Artists' Union of the USSR, for two volumes covering the history of Estonian art through 1940. Üprus died in 1978, and her work to compile the inventory of Estonia's manor houses was completed by members of the team she had supervised.

== Early life and education ==
Helmi Üprus was born on 15 October 1911 in Viljandi, in the Governorate of Livonia of the Russian Empire, (Note: Dates given throughout the article are as they appear in sources and may or may not reflect uniformity with the Gregorian calendar. Russia did not change from the Julian calendar until February 1918. Writers who converted dates may have adjusted for an eleven-day difference for the twentieth century.) to Ann (née Anderson or Andreusov) and Jaak Üprus. Her father was the conductor of the brass band in Riidaja. She had three older siblings, Eduard, Voldemar, and Hilda. By the time Estonia had gained its independence from Russia, (Note: Estonia became independent from Russia in 1920.) she was already studying the Romance languages in junior high school. Üprus graduated cum laude from the high school in Viljandi in 1929, and in 1930 began studying philosophy at the University of Tartu. Her mother died in 1934. Üprus studied under Swedish art history professor Sten Karling, alongside Villem Raam, who would later be a colleague interested in the history of art and architecture, as well as their conservation. Üprus completed her studies in 1936, with a master's degree in art history and a degree in French, Italian, and Spanish, with a minor in ethnography and English.

== Career ==
Upon her graduation, Üprus began working at the Estonian National Museum. Initially, she was the academic secretary of the museum and worked her way up to head the cultural history department. Her research in this period was primarily devoted to folk art. One project involved inventorying and photographing historic buildings in Kuressaare on Saaremaa Island, while others examined the work of silversmiths, stone markers, and illustrations of the poem Kalevipoeg. She began working at the Institute of History of the Academy of Sciences of the Estonian SSR in 1947, which had been reorganised following the Soviet occupation of the Baltic states. (Note: In 1939, a Soviet-Nazi pact supported the German Reich's occupation of Poland in trade for Soviet occupation of Estonia (also Latvia, Lithuania, and parts of Finland). The following year, the Soviet army invaded and established the Estonian Soviet Socialist Republic, incorporating the territory into the Soviet Union.) Üprus earned her magister degree in philosophy and art history in 1942, completing a thesis which examined the history of Neoclassical architecture.but lost her job in 1950 under Stalin's political repression policies. Her academic credentials were cancelled, forcing her to spend three years working in a factory.

When Stalin died in 1953, Üprus was appointed as the chief specialist in architecture and history for the government monument restoration service. (Note: The name of the department changed many times. When she was hired, it was known as the Teaduslik Restaureerimise Töökoda (Scientific Restoration Workshop) and later became the Vabariiklik Restaureerimisvalitsus (National Restoration Board), throughout her tenure.) According to scholar Olev Suuder, her approach to restoration was "the future of the past", meaning that cultural heritage should be preserved so that it would survive into the future. Her views were at odds with Khrushchev's policies, which eliminated restoration budgets as a waste of state funds and favored low-cost developments based on large-scale prefabricated panel construction. In the late 1950s, the Soviet regime began to allow citizens to travel to other Soviet states and a handful of non-Soviet locations. In 1969, Üprus participated in a seminar on restoration projects in East Germany and the following year attended a similar conference in Italy. She presented a paper on the revitalization of the center of Tallinn at a 1971 conference in Lübeck, in West Germany and traveled to a symposium of the International Council on Monuments and Sites (ICOMOS) held in Vilnius, Lithuania, in 1972.

== Research ==
Because of her educational background, Üprus was not influenced by any particular style or philosophy when writing about architecture. Drawing on her studies in art, ethnography, and history, she adopted an interdisciplinary approach. When evaluating architecture, she examined factors such as natural features and functional aspects behind a structure and its surroundings. This method was completely new to the evaluation of medieval buildings in Estonia and her work revealed that as a result of various factors influencing construction, there was no singular dominant style. Taking a special interest in public buildings, she researched structures including the manor house in Kolga; Narva fortress and bastions in Narva; the manor house in Saue; the horse mill, the House of the Brotherhood of Black Heads; St. Catherine's Monastery, and the Town Hall Pharmacy in Tallinn; and Teller's Chapel, Uspenski Cathedral, and the main building of the University of Tartu, as well as the university's observatory, in Tartu. Üprus wrote numerous chapters for Estonian and Soviet encyclopedias on art and architectural history. She also analyzed the works of contemporary artists, such as Ado Vabbe, whose works were studied in her 1976 book, Päikesemängud (Sun Games).

Throughout the 1950s and 1960s, Üprus analyzed the Tallinn Old Town center. She and Rein Zobel were responsible for meticulously documenting the medieval town and preparing a strategy for urban preservation and development. Their work led to it being designated as a state protected conservation area in 1966, the first of its kind in the USSR, serving as a model for later projects. (Note: In Lithuania, the medieval center of Vilnius was marked for restoration as early as 1956; however, no legislation was drafted which specified the status of a protected zone or rules for preservation or restoration, and limits to new construction.) In attempting to reconstruct the area, she developed a comprehensive plan on how to preserve the historical buildings while addressing functional zoning and urban renewal. Her ideas meant limiting developments liable to promote traffic and attract tourists, instead focusing on small restaurants and cafes, with spaces that served the local population. In 1967, Üprus and Harald Arman and other scientists were awarded the Nõukogude Eesti preemia (Prize of Soviet Estonia) in the category of art historians, for their work Eesti arhitektuuri ajalugu (History of Estonian Architecture). The majority of the chapters in the book were written by Üprus and Voldemar Vaga.

In 1975, Üprus was honored by the Estonian Association of Art Scientists and Curators (Estonian: Eesti Kunstiteadlaste ja Kuraatorite Ühing) with the 1974 annual prize for her article which appeared in the journal Ehitus ja Arhitektuur (Construction and Architecture). She worked with other editors to produce Volume 1, Parts 1 and 2 of Eesti kunsti ajalugu (History of Estonian Art), published in 1975 and 1977. The first part covered art up to the middle of the nineteenth century and the second part continued with art up to 1940. Üprus's contributions included papers on folk art, classical architecture, and architecture and stonework of the Renaissance and baroque periods. In 1977, all of the writers involved in the project received the State Prize of the Artists' Union of the USSR for each of the two parts. Üprus wrote the year before her death "I have had three grand projects in my life: the History of Estonian Architecture ['Eesti arhitektuuri ajalugu'], the regeneration of Tallinn’s Old Town and now the architecture of the manors. If I can complete the latter, my life work is done".

Üprus began inventorying Estonia's manor houses at the request of Fredi-Armand Tomps, who in the 1970s was leading the restoration of estates in the Lahemaa National Park. When she began compiling the list in 1975, there were only fragmentary records of manors built in the Swedish era prepared by Gustav Ränk and a study of 150 Estonian mansions collected by the Latvian architectural historian Heinz Pīrangs in his study of Baltic estates. Using pre-World War I-era topographical maps and an address directory, she and her team had to compare German, Estonian, and Russian place names to create the list of 2267 manors. Although she published reports and articles on the progress of her research, her untimely death left Juhan Maiste in charge of assembling a team to complete the project.

== Death and legacy ==
Üprus died on 27 August 1978, in Tallinn, and her ashes were placed in the Tarvastu cemetery in Tinnikuru. She was memorialized for her work to preserve the history of art and architecture in Estonia. According to historian Anneli Randla, Üprus was the "leading specialist" on architecture in Estonia, while Lilian Hansar, heritage conservationist for the Estonian Academy of Arts, called her work "outstanding" noting that her study on Tallinn's historical center led to its becoming protected by the state and fostered new research. The obituary prepared by the Association of Architects of the Estonian SSR for the newspaper Sirp ja Vasar, called her one of the most important researchers of Estonian architectural heritage. In both the Soviet era and later independent Estonia, her work was recognized as authoritative.

Üprus was posthumously honored, along with the other authors of History of Estonian Art, the Nõukogude Eesti preemia (Prize of Soviet Estonia) in 1980, and commemorated on her birthday by newspapers in every decade from 1981 to the twenty-first century. Vaga edited and published her unfinished work, Raidkivikunst Eestis XIII–XVII sajandini (Stone Carving in Estonia from the Thirteenth to the Seventeenth Centuries) in 1987. The following year, the film Õed Üprused (The Üprus Sisters) aired on Eesti Televisioon. Directed by Aime Kala and written by Airi Kasera, who also narrated the production, it told the story of Helmi and Hilda Üprus, through interviews with their friends and colleagues. Numerous dissertations, lectures. seminars and conferences hosted by academics and museums have paid homage to her life and work. The Baltic Journal of Art History dedicated an entire issue to her and her works in 2011 in honor of her 100th birthday. Her papers have been deposited at the National Heritage Board Archives.

== Selected works ==
- Üprus, Helmi (1942). Tartu klassitsistlik arhitektuur [Classical Architecture of Tartu] (magister's degree) (in Estonian). Tartu, Estonian SSR: Tartu Ülikool.
- Üprus, Helmi (1947). "Hõbehelmed ja eesti soost ehtemeistrid" [Silver Beads and Estonian Jewelers]. Eesti Rahva Muuseumi Aastaraamat (in Estonian). 15. Tartu, Estonia: Eesti Rahva Muuseumi: 138–156. ISSN 0320-2186.
- Üprus, Helmi (1965). Tallinn aastal 1825 [Tallinn in 1825] (in Estonian). Tallinn, Estonian SSR: Kirjastus Kunst. OCLC 8083446.
- Arman, Harald; Papp, H.; Kammal, U.; Üprus, Helmi, eds. (1965). Eesti arhitektuuri ajalugu [History of Estonian Architecture] (in Estonian). Tallinn, Estonia: Kirjastus Eesti Raamat. OCLC 3443296.
- Üprus, Helmi (1969). Vaga, Voldemar (ed.). "Tartu varaklassitsistlik arhitektuur (a. 1775–1800)" [Early Classical Architecture of Tartu: (ca. 1775–1800)]. Tartu Riikliku Ülikooli toimetised (in Estonian). 229 (1). Tartu, Estonian SSR: Tartu Riiklik Ülikool: 185–232. ISSN 0494-7304.
- Üprus, Helmi (1971). "The "Old Town" of Tallinn and Its Future". Monumentum. 7 (4). Paris, France: International Council on Monuments and Sites: 71–97. ISSN 0027-0776. OCLC 888396488.
- Üprus, Helmi (1974). "Sotsiaalsete, funktsionaalsete ja looduslike iseärasuste osatähtsus Tallinna vanalinna regenereerimisel" [The Role of Social, Functional and Natural Features in the Regeneration of Tallinn's Old Town]. Ehitus Ja Arhitektuur (in Estonian) (1). Tallinn, Estonian SSR: ENSV Ministrite Nõukogu Riiklik Ehituskomitee: 12–22. ISSN 0320-6335.
- Üprus, Helmi (1975). "Rahvakunst [Folk Art]". In Bernštein, Boris; Jansen, Ea; Kahk, J.; Kirme, Kaalu; Pihlak, E.; Solomõkova, Irina; Tiik, V.; Vaga, Voldemar (eds.). Eesti kunsti ajalugu [History of Estonian Art] (in Estonian). Vol. I. köite I. osa.: Eesti kunst kõige varasemast ajast kuni 19. sajandi keskpaigani [Volume 1, Part 1: Estonian Art from the Earliest Times to the Middle of the 19th Century]. Tallinn, Estonian SSR: Kirjastus Kunst. pp. 152–177. OCLC 174371845.
- Üprus, Helmi (1976). Päikesemängud [Sun Games] (in Estonian). Tallinn, Estonian SSR: Kirjastus Kunst. OCLC 499453931.
- Üprus, Helmi (1987). Vaga, Voldemar (ed.). Raidkivikunst Eestis XIII-XVII sajandini [Stone Carving in Estonia from the Thirteenth to the Seventeenth Centuries] (in Estonian). Tallinn, Estonian SSR: Kirjastus Kunst. OCLC 19774464.
