= Journal of Estonian and Finno-Ugric linguistics =

Academic journal Estonian and other Finno-Ugric languages

- Discipline: Linguistics
- Language: English, Estonian
- Edited by: Pärtel Lippus, Petar Kehayov

Publication details
- History: 2010–present
- Publisher: University of Tartu Press on behalf of the Institute of Estonian and General Linguistics (University of Tartu) (Estonia)
- Frequency: Biannually
- Open access: Yes
- ISO 4: Find out here

Indexing
- ISSN: 1736-8987 (print); 2228-1339 (web)
- LCCN: 2018215103
- OCLC no.: 1029762156

Links
- Journal homepage; Online access; Online archive

The Journal of Estonian and Finno-Ugric linguistics (parallel Estonian title Eesti ja soome-ugri keeleteaduse ajakiri; self-abbreviation ESUKA–JEFUL) is a biannual peer-reviewed academic journal covering various linguistics aspects of Estonian and other Finno-Ugric languages. It is published by the University of Tartu Press on behalf of the Institute of Estonian and General Linguistics (University of Tartu). The founding editor was Urmas Sutrop; current editors are Pärtel Lippus and Petar Kehayov. The journal was established in 2010 and publishes articles in English and Estonian. Volumes are published both in print version and in open access web version.

== Abstracting and indexing ==
The journal is abstracted and indexed in the Emerging Sources Citation Index and Scopus.
