= Sulejman Šarac =

3rd Grand Mufti for Bosnia and Herzegovina from 1910 to 1912

Hafiz Sulejman Šarac
- Title: 3rd Grand Mufti for Bosnia and Herzegovina

Personal life
- Born: 1850 Stolac, Bosnia Eyalet, Ottoman Empire
- Died: 27 December 1927 (aged 76–77) Sarajevo, Kingdom of Serbs, Croats and Slovenes

Religious life
- Religion: Sunni Islam

Senior posting
- Period in office: 1910 – 1912
- Predecessor: Mehmed Teufik Azabagić
- Successor: Džemaludin Čaušević

Hfz. Sulejman Šarac (1850 − 27 December 1927) was a Bosnian cleric who served as the Grand Mufti for Bosnia and Herzegovina from 1910 to 1912.

== Biography ==
He was born in Stolac, where he completed his primary school and earned the title of hafiz. He graduated higher education in Istanbul in 1878. Upon his return to Bosnia and Herzegovina in 1879, he was appointed mufti of Bihać, a position he remained in until 1887, after which he was appointed a professor and later principal of the Sheria School of Judges in Sarajevo.

He actively participated in the movement for religious and religious-educational autonomy of Muslims in Bosnia and Herzegovina, for which Austria-Hungary greatly resented him and the then Provincial Government in Bosnia and Herzegovina transferred him to the Supreme Sharia Court. However, his reputation and popularity grew quickly, and after the victory for religious and religious-educational autonomy, he was unanimously elected as the Grand Mufti for Bosnia and Herzegovina. Hfz. Sulejman ef. Šarac was the first Grand Mufti elected by the Bosniaks. His election was not to the liking of Austria-Hungary, which, after two years of work, forced him to resign through the same Curia of Clerics (Hodžinska kurija) that had unanimously elected him two years earlier. After an ultimatum from the Provincial Government in Bosnia and Herzegovina to resign within eight days, hfz. Sulejman Šarac resigned from the position of Grand Mufti in August 1912. After that, he devoted himself to his family and science.

He died on December 27, 1927 in Sarajevo.

Religious titles
Preceded by Mehmed Teufik Azabagić	3rd Grand Mufti for Bosnia and Herzegovina; 1910–1912	Succeeded by Džemaludin Čaušević
