= Islamic Community in Bosnia and Herzegovina =

Representative body of Muslims

Islamic Community of Bosnia and Herzegovina
- Islamska zajednica u Bosni i Hercegovini المشيخة الإسلامية في البوسنة والهرسك
- Formation: 15 December 1882; 143 years ago
- Type: Religious organization
- Headquarters: Sarajevo, Bosnia and Herzegovina
- Region served: Bosnia and Herzegovina; Montenegro; Serbia; Croatia; Slovenia; Hungary; Bosniak diaspora
- Official language: Bosnian
- Reis-ul-ulema: Nedžad Grabus
- Head of Parliament: Edhem Bičakčić
- Main organ: Parliament (Sabor)
- Website: islamskazajednica.ba

The Islamic Community of Bosnia and Herzegovina (Bosnian: Islamska zajednica u Bosni i Hercegovini) is a religious organisation of Muslims in Bosnia and Herzegovina. It is also recognised as the highest representative body of Muslims in the region, especially in Serbia, Croatia, Slovenia, Montenegro, Hungary and Bosniak diaspora.

It was established in Sarajevo in 1882 by Austria-Hungary, to have a controlled Islamic Community in Bosnia and Herzegovina after the Ottoman Empire lost control over Bosnia and Herzegovina in 1878. The headquarter of the community is in Sarajevo and the current leader (Grand Mufti), titled Reis-ul-ulema, is Nedžad Grabus.

== History ==
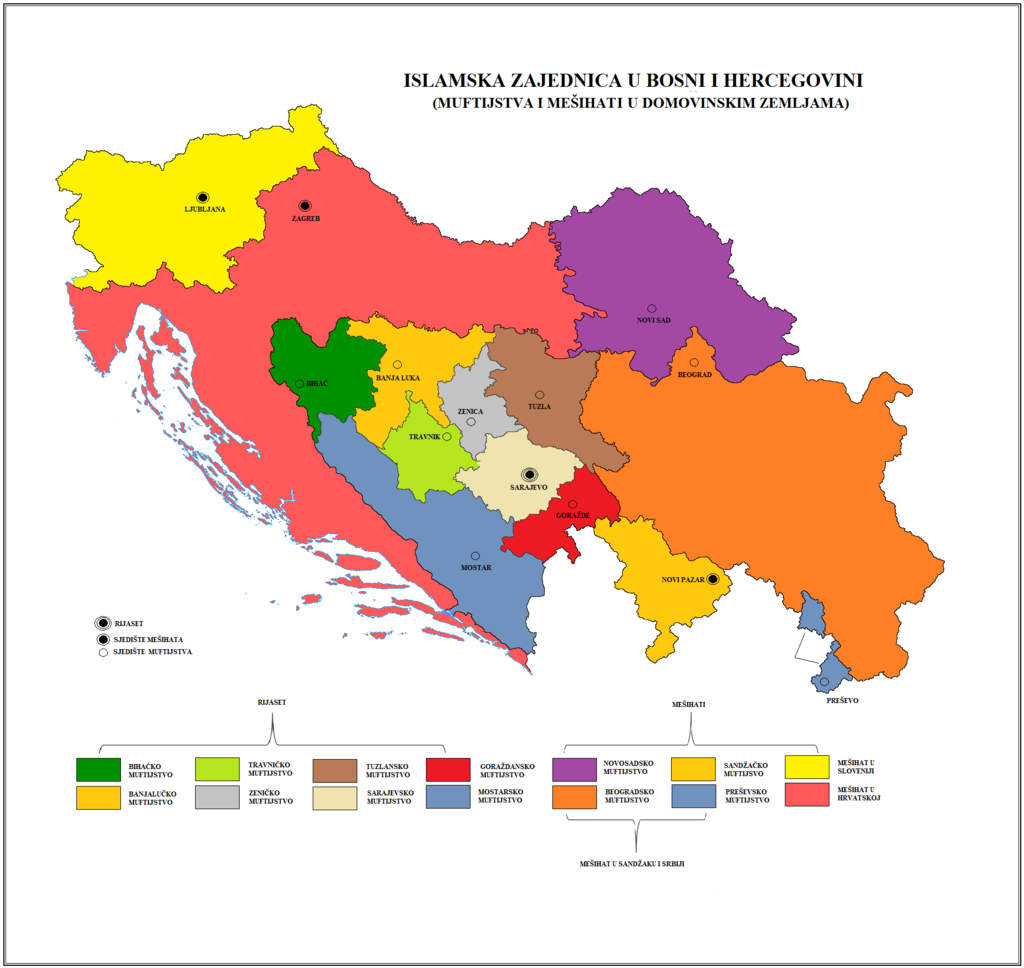
Organisational structure of the Islamic Community in Bosnia and Herzegovina.

The Islamic Community was established in 1882 during the Austrian-Hungarian rule over Bosnia and Herzegovina. After the creation of the Kingdom of Serbs, Croats and Slovenes, the seat of the Islamic Community was moved from Sarajevo to Belgrade, but was moved back to Sarajevo in 1936. During the breakup of Yugoslavia, the organized community on Yugoslav level broke up, while the majority of local and regional Muslim communities accepted the historic authority of the Islamic Community of Bosnia and Herzegovina.

The Islamic Community of Bosnia and Herzegovina was initially weak, but with the help from Alija Izetbegović, Bosnia and Herzegovina's first president of the Presidency, as well as key military leaders, it became a pillar of the Bosniak national identity. Under the tenure of the Reis-ul-ulema Mustafa Cerić, who held this office from April 1993 until November 2012, the Islamic Community promoted Bosniak culture, politics and identity, with its influence extending beyond the faithful and attracting many who were not practicing Muslims during the socialist period, as well as Bosniaks and other Slavic Muslims living in the region of Sandžak and elsewhere.

== Jurisdiction ==
The Islamic Community of Bosnia and Herzegovina and its head, the Reis-ul-ulema of Bosnia and Herzegovina, are the highest religious authorities for approximately 2.5 million Bosnian Muslims in the world. The Islamic Community has jurisdiction over the entire Bosnia and Herzegovina, as well as Croatia, Slovenia and Bosniak religious communities around the world. However, there is a dispute in Serbia over what Islamic Community has jurisdiction over the country, Bosnian or Serbian. Sandžak Mufti Muamer Zukorlić, who was supported by former Reis-ul-ulema Mustafa Cerić, wanted that they remain under the jurisdiction of the Islamic Community of Bosnia and Herzegovina, while the Serbian Reis-ul-ulema Adem Zilkić wanted to expand the jurisdiction of the Islamic Community of Serbia to the entire country. He was supported by the deceased Serbian Reis-ul-ulema Hamdija Jusufspahić, and later by his son Muhamed.

The highest body of Muslims in Hungary, the Hungarian Islamic Council, have expressed willingness to become part of the Islamic Community of Bosnia and Herzegovina and for the Reis-ul-ulema of Bosnia and Herzegovina to act as the supreme religious authority for Hungarian Muslims.

Sufi orders in areas under jurisdiction of the Islamic Community are operating within the Tariqa Center and are autonomous but subordinated to the Islamic Community and the Reis-ul-ulema.

== Media ==
Beside BIR TV, the Islamic Community of Bosnia and Herzegovina is, via Media centar d.o.o. Sarajevo, also owner of the Preporod weekly newspaper, Islamic radio station - Radio BIR, MINA News agency and Preporod.info website.

== List of Reis-ul-ulema ==
Nedžad Grabus, Reis-ul-ulema of Bosnia and Herzegovina since 2026

No.	Name	Leadership	Place of birth
1	Effendi; Mustafa Hilmi; Hadžiomerović (1816–1895)	15 December 1882 – 20 November 1893 (10 years, 340 days)	Bihać, Bosnia Eyalet
2	Effendi; Mehmed Teufik; Azabagić (1838–1918)	20 November 1893 – 1909	Tuzla, Bosnia Eyalet
3	Effendi; Sulejman Šarac (1850–1927)	1910 – August 1912	Stolac, Bosnia Eyalet
4	Effendi; Džemaludin Čaušević (1870–1938)	26 March 1914 – 12 June 1930 (16 years, 78 days)	Bosanska Krupa, Bosnia vilayet
Reis-ul-ulema of Yugoslavia (1930–1993)
5	Effendi; Mustafa Cerić (born 1952)	April 1993 – 19 November 2012	Visoko, PR Bosnia and Herzegovina
6	Effendi; Husein Kavazović (born 1964)	19 November 2012 – 15 November 2026 (13 years, 361 days)	Gradačac, SR Bosnia and Herzegovina
7	Effendi; Nedžad Grabus (born 1968)	15 November 2026 – present (0 days)	Travnik, SR Bosnia and Herzegovina

== See also ==
- Islam in Bosnia and Herzegovina
- Islamic Community of Yugoslavia
