= Helmi (surname) =

Helmi is a surname. Notable people with the surname include:

- Amina Helmi, Argentine astronomer
- Mohamed Helmi, Egyptian footballer
- Moustafa Helmi (1911–1992), Egyptian footballer
- Yasmine Helmi, Egyptian sport shooter

== See also ==
- Helmy (disambiguation)
