= Helmy =

Helmy may refer to:

== People ==
=== Given name ===
- Helmy Fauzi (born 1964), Indonesian politician
- Helmy Halim (1916–1971), Egyptian film director, screenwriter and film producer
- Helmy Kresa, (born 1905), songwriter and the principal arranger and orchestrator for Irving Berlin

=== Surname ===
- Ahmed Helmy (born 1969), Egyptian comedian and drama actor
- George Helmy (born 1979), American politician
- Mohamed Helmy, former striker and current coach for El Zamalek for the Egyptian national football team
- Saleh Helmi, designer of Helmy Aerogypt aircraft
- Taher Helmy, Egyptian lawyer

== Other ==
- Helmy Aerogypt, British four-seat cabin monoplane design of 1930s-1940s

== See also ==
- Helmi (disambiguation)
- Hilmi
