= Hilmi =

Hilmi (Arabic: حلمي) is a masculine Arabic given name. Notable people with the name include:

== Given name ==
=== First name ===
- Hilmi Esat Bayındırlı (born 1962), Turkish-American para-skier
- Hilmi Volkan Demir (born 1976), Turkish scientist, best known for his works on White Light Generation
- Hilmi Güler (born 1946), Turkish politician and metallurgical engineer
- Hilmi Hanoun (1913–2001), Palestinian businessman, journalist and politician
- Hilmi İşgüzar (1929–2019), Turkish politician
- Hilmi Mihçi (born 1976), Dutch footballer of Turkish descent
- Hilmi Murad (1919–1998), Egyptian economist and politician
- Hilmi Ok (1932–2020), Turkish football referee
- Hilmi Özkök (born 1940), Former chief of general staff of the Turkish Armed Forces
- Hilmi Sözer (born 1970), Turkish-German actor
- Hilmi Ziya Ülken (1901–1974), Turkish scholar
- Hilmi Yarayıcı (born 1969), Turkish musician
- Hilmi M. Zawati (born 1953), Palestinian jurist

=== Midname ===
- Ahmad Hilmi of Filibe (or Ahmet Hilmi) (1865–1914), well known Turkish Sufi writer and thinker
- Ahmed Hilmi Abd al-Baqi (1883–1963), Palestinian politician and economist
- Hüseyin Hilmi Işık (1911–2001), Turkish Sunni Islamic scholar
- Hüseyin Hilmi Pasha (1855–1922), statesman and twice Grand vizier of the Ottoman Empire
- Mustafa Hilmi Hadžiomerović (1816–1895), the first Mufti of Sarajevo appointed Reis-l-ulema in 1882 by the Austrian authorities
- Süleyman Hilmi Tunahan, (1888–1959), Islamic erudite of the 20th century

== Surname ==
- Mohamed Hilmi (1931–2022), Algerian actor
- Rafiq Hilmi (1898–1960), Kurdish historian, writer and politician born in Kirkuk

== See also ==
- Helmi, an alternate spelling
