= Helmy Aerogypt =

Aerogypt
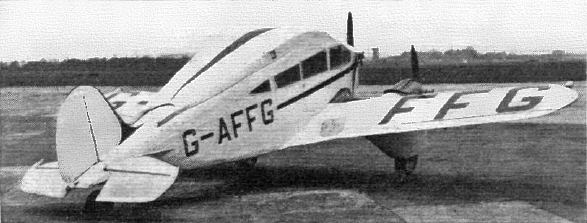
- Helmy Aerogypt, Heston 1939

General information
- Type: Four-seat cabin monoplane
- National origin: United Kingdom
- Manufacturer: Helmy
- Designer: S Helmy
- Number built: 1

History
- Manufactured: 1938
- First flight: 1939
- Retired: 1946

The Helmy Aerogypt was a British four-seat cabin monoplane designed and built by Egyptian Saleh Helmy at Heston Aerodrome in 1938. The Aerogypt I was a low-wing cantilever monoplane initially powered by three 22 hp (16 kW) Douglas Sprite engines. The aircraft had an upward hinged roof that acted as a landing flap. Registered G-AFFG, it first flew in 1939. It later had the hinged roof removed, and was re-designated the Aerogypt II. Another modification added end plates to the horizontal tail surfaces, and was re-designated the Aerogypt III, and last flown in that configuration in September 1940.

In 1943, the aircraft was modified as the Aerogypt IV with a tricycle landing gear and two 65 hp (48 kW) Continental A65 engines. It was flown from White Waltham Airfield, but in November 1946 it was damaged beyond repair when it was dropped by the recovery crane following a landing accident at RAF Northolt.

== Variants ==
Aerogypt I
Initial designation, a three-engine monoplane with tail wheel landing gear.
Aerogypt II
Modified with hinged roof removed.
Aerogypt III
Modified with end plates on horizontal tail surfaces.
Aerogypt IV
Rebuilt as a two-engine monoplane with tricycle landing gear.

== Specifications (Aerogypt IV) ==
Data from Jackson (1974), p 250

General characteristics

- Crew: 1
- Capacity: 3 passengers
- Length: 19 ft 0 in (5.79 m)
- Wingspan: 26 ft 4 in (8.03 m)
- Height: 6 ft 6 in (1.98 m)
- Wing area: 85 sq ft (7.9 m^{2})
- Empty weight: 1,150 lb (522 kg)
- Gross weight: 2,400 lb (1,089 kg)
- Powerplant: 2 × Continental A65 , 65 hp (48 kW) each

Performance

- Maximum speed: 160 mph (260 km/h, 140 kn)
- Cruise speed: 145 mph (233 km/h, 126 kn)
- Range: 480 mi (770 km, 420 nmi)
- Service ceiling: 17,000 ft (5,200 m)
- Rate of climb: 600 ft/min (3.0 m/s)
