= Helmi Technologies =

Helmi Technologies, Inc.
- Type: Private company
- Industry: Software
- Founded: Oulu, Finland, Finland (2004)
- Headquarters: Cupertino, California, United States of America
- Key people: Juho Risku, Founder in 2004, CEO between 2004 - 2006
- Products: Helmi Open Source RIA Platform

Helmi Technologies and its predecessor, Visualway Design, evolved from the desire of Finnish user interface (UI) designers and software engineers to build high-impact web-based applications and sites on an open source platform.

Visualway Design was founded in 1996 and developed its first AJAX-type e-commerce application in 1997. This software featured layer-based windowing support, client-side payment systems, multiple browser support, and the ability to share information with other applications. During 2001 Visualway started development of its Virtual Browser, an application independent of browsers and UI components to be used across many platforms and devices. The patent applications for Virtual Browser were filed in 2003 and patent was granted in 2006.

In 2004, Helmi Technologies separated from Visualway Design, with Helmi receiving its first round of venture capital and opening an office in Silicon Valley, California, in 2005. Helmi Technologies announced the release its product as open source at AJAX world Conference and Expo in October 2006, and joined the Eclipse Foundation as an Add-In Provider.

== History ==
Founded by Juho Risku in 1996 as Visualway Design, a digital media design agency. Visualway developed its first AJAX-type e-commerce application in 1997. The software featured layer-based windowing, client-side payment systems, multiple browser support and the ability to share information with other applications.

Between 1998 and 2001 Visualway developed an advanced version of DynAPI for its own internal use. During 2001 Visualway started to develop its Virtual Browser. Visualway also developed plug-ins for Macromedia Dreamweaver. Helmi technologies received Macromedia Approved Certification in 2003 for the plug-ins developed by Visualway.

In 2004 Helmi Technologies became an independent company. Helmi technologies soon filed a patent application for Virtual Browser and released its first version. The first version of the UI component library was released in 2005.

With global demand for RIA solutions Helmi Technologies opened its Silicon Valley branch in 2005, after receiving its first round of venture capital. Helmi Technologies commenced work on version 2.0 of User Interface Framework. Helmi Technologies' Virtual Browser patent was granted 2006. In October 2006 Helmi released the 2.0 version to the open source community and joined the Eclipse Foundation. In December 2006, Helmi closed its Silicon Valley branch and by May 2007, the company had been closed down.

== Products ==
Helmi Technologies offered Helmi Open Source RIA Development Platform – open source, AJAX-based platform for creating Rich Internet Applications.

The Helmi Open Source RIA Platform supported rapid creation of interactive web-based applications by leveraging developers' existing skills and the development environments they were familiar with. The Helmi platform enabled UI component reusage across applications. It also allowed client- and server-side developers to work on independent parts of the application simultaneously.

=== Platform sub-components ===
- User Interface Framework – a browser-based server-independent user interface kit for RIA application development coupled with a minimalistic, speed-oriented server framework. The user interface framework incorporated patented Virtual Browser technology in its 1.0 version. It was removed from the 2.0 version, because of the serious performance hit, caused by its usage as well as the difficulty of maintaining and using an almost DOM-like set of JavaScript objects written in a very obfuscated way. Virtual Browser was replaced with a caching DOM-abstraction engine called Element Manager in the 2.0 version.
- Server Integration Framework – A set of reference server implementations and integration components. Reference implementations were available for PHP, Ruby and Python. There were also some prototypes of Java EE and .NET integration, but the Ruby version was the only fully implemented server framework.
- Programmers Integrated Development Environment (IDE) - The Helmi IDE was a full customized distribution of Eclipse with a few defunct wizards based on a very early alpha version of the client framework.

Right now the User Interface Framework portion of Helmi Open Source RIA Development Platform is outdated and defunct.

Helmi's GPL:ed software has been branched off as a new open source project called Himle in early 2008, which was later renamed RSence. It is now licensed under the MIT license.

== See also ==
- RIA
- Eclipse Foundation
- AJAX
