= Arapuša =

Arapuša Арапуша
- Village
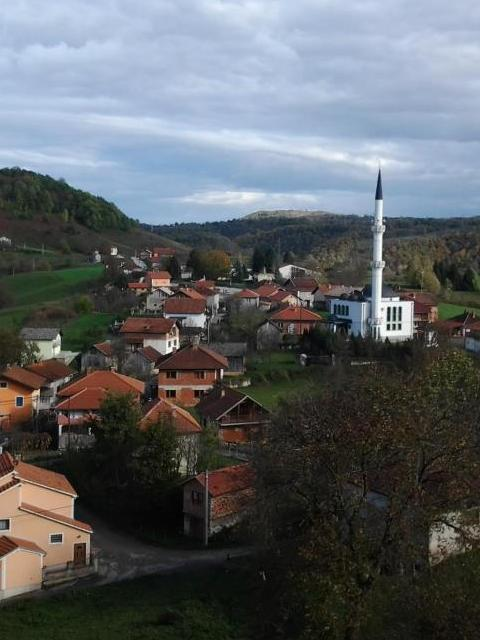
- Arapuša in 2012

- Location within Bosnia and Herzegovina
- Coordinates: 44°53′N 16°15′E
- Country: Bosnia and Herzegovina
- Entity: Federation of Bosnia and Herzegovina
- Canton: Una-Sana
- Municipality: Bosanska Krupa

Government
  - Gradonacelnik: Samir Alijagic

Area
  - Total: 1.61 sq mi (4.16 km^{2})

Population (2013)
  - Total: 273
  - Density: 170/sq mi (65.6/km^{2})
- Time zone: UTC+1 (CET)
  - Summer (DST): UTC+2 (CEST)

Arapuša (Serbian Cyrillic: Арапуша) is a village in the municipality of Bosanska Krupa, Bosnia and Herzegovina.

== Demographics ==
According to the 2013 census, its population was 273.

Ethnicity in 2013
Ethnicity	Number	Percentage
Bosniaks	268	98.2%
Serbs	3	1.1%
other/undeclared	2	0.7%
Total	273	100%
