= Voldemar Vaga =

Estonian art/architecture historian and teacher

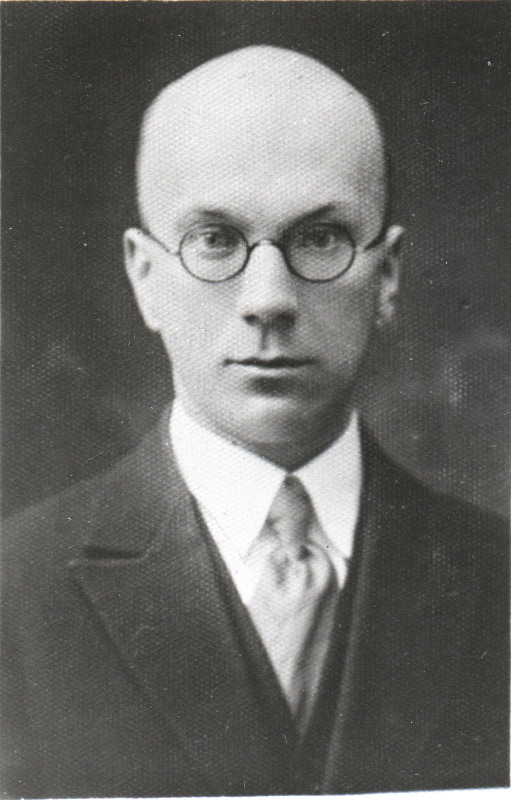
Image of Voldemar Vaga

Voldemar Vaga (29 June 1899, in Tallinn – 22 February 1999, in Tartu) was an Estonian art and architecture historian and teacher.

1913–1914 he studied at drawing courses of Estonian Arts Society. 1918–1919 he studied at Ants Laikmaa studio school. 1926 he graduated from Tartu University.

1933–1937 he was editor of the art department of Estonian Encyclopaedia.

1925–1940 he was lecturer at Pallas Art School and 1944–1969 lecturer at Tartu University.

His most important publication was "General Art History" (1937–1938).
