= University of Tartu Press =

Publishing company based in Tartu, Estonia

- Parent company: University of Tartu
- Founded: 1632
- Country of origin: Estonia
- Headquarters location: Tartu
- Publication types: books, journals
- Official website: Official website

University of Tartu Press (Estonian: Tartu Ülikooli Kirjastus) is a university press and publishing house owned by the University of Tartu, Estonia.

Tartu University Press dates its history back to 1632, when University of Tartu was founded. It is the largest university press in Estonia.

It produces academic books and journals, including the international journal of semiotics, Sign Systems Studies, Baltic Journal of Art History, a book series Tartu Semiotics Library (Estonian: Tartu Semiootika Raamatukogu), etc.

University of Tartu Press is a member of the Association of European University Presses.

The publishing house publishes dissertations, scientific literature and educational literature, as well as scientific serials and magazines. Since 2012, only pre-reviewed educational and research publications have been published under the Tartu University Press brand.

The press is a member of the Association of European University Presses.
