= Baltic Journal of Art History =

Academic journal on arts in the Baltic countries

- Discipline: Art history
- Language: English, Estonian, German
- Edited by: Kadri Asmer

Publication details
- History: 2009–present
- Publisher: University of Tartu Press on behalf of the Institute of History and Archeology (University of Tartu) (Estonia)
- Frequency: Biannually
- Open access: Yes

Standard abbreviations
- ISO 4: Balt. J. Art Hist.

Indexing
- ISSN: 1736-8812 (print); 2346-5581 (web)
- LCCN: 2011215133
- OCLC no.: 733352685

Links
- Journal homepage; Online access; Online archive

The Baltic Journal of Art History is a biannual peer-reviewed academic journal covering art history of the Baltic countries. It is published by the University of Tartu Press on behalf of the Institute of History and Archeology (University of Tartu) and the editor-in-chief is Kadri Asmer (University of Tartu). It was established in 2009 and publishes articles in English, Estonian, and German.

== Abstracting and indexing ==
The journal is abstracted and indexed in the Emerging Sources Citation Index and Scopus.
