= Ilmari Manninen =

Finnish ethnographer (1894–1935)

- Born: 2 September 1894; Viipuri
- Died: 14 June 1935 (aged 40); Helsinki

Ilmari Justus Andreus Manninen (2 September 1894 – 14 June 1935) was a Finnish professor, writer and ethnographer. He led the Estonian National Museum when it opened at Raadi Manor.

== Life ==
Manninen was born in Viipuri in 1894. in 1919 Tartu University was allowed to become a university that taught all its lessons in the Estonian language. This was a new venture and the ambition was limited by the number of Estonian speaking lecturers. To fill the gap a number of foreigners were invited, including Manninen, to assist.

In 1922 the university obtained the rights to Raadi Manor which had been the ancestral home of the art collecting noble family of the Lipharts. The relatively new Estonian National Museum was to establish itself there and Manninen was successful in being appointed the director.

When he left Estonia it was to lead the Ethnographic Department of the National Museum in Helsinki.

Manninen died in Helsinki in 1935 at the age of 40. The Finnish Antiquarian Society struck a medal in his honour that was designed by Kalervo Kallio in 1952.

== Works ==
- Eesti rahvariiete ajalugu. Tartu, 1927.
- Die Sachkultur Estlands, 3 vols. Tartu, 1931–33.
- Suomensukuiset Kansat. Porvoo, 1929.
- Suomen suku, vol. 1. Helsinki, 1934.
