= Mustafa Hilmi Hadžiomerović =

1st Grand Mufti for Bosnia and Herzegovina from 1882 to 1893

Effendi Mustafa Hilmi Hadžiomerović
- Title: 1st Grand Mufti for Bosnia and Herzegovina

Personal life
- Born: 1816 Kulen Vakuf, Bosnia Eyalet, Ottoman Empire
- Died: 10 February 1895 (aged 78–79) Sarajevo, Bosnia and Herzegovina, Austria-Hungary

Religious life
- Religion: Sunni Islam

Senior posting
- Period in office: 15 December 1882 – 20 November 1893
- Successor: Mehmed Teufik Azabagić

Mustafa Hilmi ef. Hadžiomerović (1816 – 10 February 1895) was a Bosnian cleric who served as the first Grand Mufti for Bosnia and Herzegovina from 1882 to 1893.

== Biography ==
Born in Kulen Vakuf in 1816, Hadžiomerović received his basic religious and general education in his birth town. He later studied at a high school in Prijedor, before attending the Gazi Husrev Bey's Madrasa in Sarajevo.

In 1837, Hadžiomerović went to the Ottoman capital of Constantinople to study at a Madrasa there for 15 years. He then returned to Bosnia to work in Bosanski Novi and was then posted to the Kuršumli Madrasa in Sarajevo as a schoolteacher. A year later, he was appointed imam at the Arebi-Atik mosque.

In 1856, Hadžiomerović was appointed Mufti of Sarajevo, but he continued his teaching duties, giving lectures until 1888. Following the Austro-Hungarian occupation of Bosnia and Herzegovina in 1878, he made public appeals for peace and calm. On 17 October 1882, the Austro-Hungarian authorities appointed him Grand Mufti (Reis-ul-ulema) in order to gradually separate Bosnia from Ottoman authority. Hadžiomerović officially took over the position on 15 December 1882. He issued a number of Fatwa, encouraging the Bosnian Muslim population to stay (over 100,000 emigrated to Turkey during the 1880s) and collaborate, and also to serve in the Bosnian-Herzegovinian Infantry.

Exhausted from many years of work, Hadžiomerović resigned as Grand Mufti in 1893 and died two years later on 10 February 1895.

== Literature ==
- Noel Malcolm, Bosnia: A Short History, 1994
- Fikret Karčić, The Bosniaks and the Challenges of Modernity: Late Ottoman and Hapsburg Times (1995)

Religious titles
Preceded by Position established	1st Grand Mufti for Bosnia and Herzegovina; 1882–1893	Succeeded by Mehmed Teufik Azabagić
