= Islam in Bosnia and Herzegovina =

Islam in Europe by percentage of country population 95–100%: Azerbaijan; 90–95%: Turkey; Kosovo; 50–70%: Albania; Bosnia and Herzegovina; Kazakhstan; 30–35%: North Macedonia; 10–20%: France; Sweden; Georgia; Montenegro; 5–10%: Austria; Belgium; Bulgaria; Denmark; Germany; Liechtenstein; Luxembourg; Netherlands; Russia; Switzerland; United Kingdom; Spain; Greece; 4–5%: Serbia; 2–4%: Italy; Finland; Norway; Malta; Slovenia; Cyprus (Note: Only takes into account the Muslim population residing on land controlled by the Republic of Cyprus.); 1–2%: Croatia; Ireland; Ukraine; Andorra; < 1%: Iceland; Armenia; Belarus; Czech Republic; Estonia; Hungary; Latvia; Lithuania; Moldova; Monaco; Poland; Portugal; Romania; San Marino; Slovakia

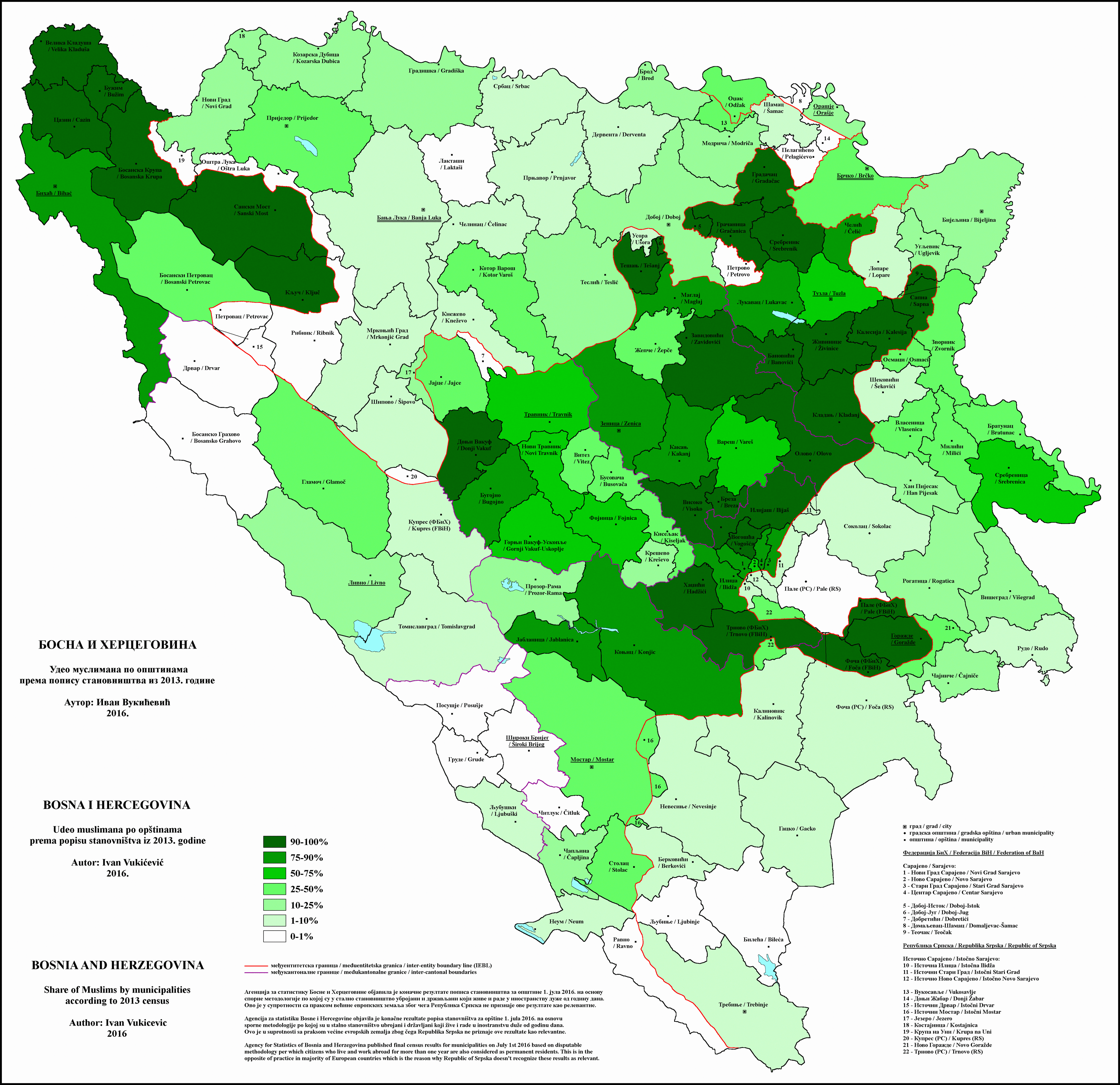
Share of Muslims in Bosnia and Herzegovina by municipalities in 2013

Islam is the most popular religion in Bosnia and Herzegovina. It was introduced to the local population in the 15th and 16th centuries as a result of the Ottoman conquest of Bosnia and Herzegovina.

Muslims comprise the largest religious community in Bosnia and Herzegovina at around 51% of the population.

Almost all Bosnian Muslims identify as Bosniaks; until 1993, Bosnians of Muslim culture or origin (regardless of religious practice) were defined by Yugoslav authorities as Muslimani (Muslims) in an ethno-national sense (hence the capital M), though some people of Bosniak or Muslim backgrounds identified their nationality (in an ethnic sense rather than strictly in terms of citizenship) as "Yugoslav" prior to the early 1990s. A small minority of non-Bosniak Muslims in Bosnia and Herzegovina include Albanians, Roma and Turks.

Although traditionally adherent to Sunni Islam of the Hanafi school of jurisprudence, a 2012 survey found that 54% of Bosnia and Herzegovina's Muslims consider themselves Non-denominational Muslims, while 38% said that they are Sunni Muslims. There is also a small Sufi community, located primarily in Central Bosnia. A small Shia Muslim community is also present in Bosnia. Almost all Muslim congregations in Bosnia and Herzegovina refer to the Islamic Community in Bosnia and Herzegovina as their religious organisation.

The Constitution of Bosnia and Herzegovina guarantees freedom of religion, which is generally upheld throughout the country.

== History ==
=== The Ottoman era ===
Islam was first introduced to the Balkans on a large scale by the Ottomans in the mid-to-late 15th century who gained control of most of Bosnia in 1463, and seized Herzegovina in the 1480s. Over the next century, the Bosnians — composed of native Christians and Slavic tribes living in the Bosnian kingdom under the name of Bošnjani — were converted to Islam in great numbers during the Islamization of Bosnia under Ottoman rule. During the Ottoman era the name Bošnjanin was definitely transformed into the current Bošnjak ('Bosniak'), with the suffix -ak replacing the traditional -anin. By the early 1600s, approximately two thirds of the population of Bosnia were Muslim. Bosnia and Herzegovina remained a province in the Ottoman Empire and gained autonomy after the Bosnian uprising in 1831. Large numbers of mosques were built all over the province. Most mosques erected during the Ottoman era were of relatively modest construction, often with a single minaret and central prayer hall with few adjoining foyers.

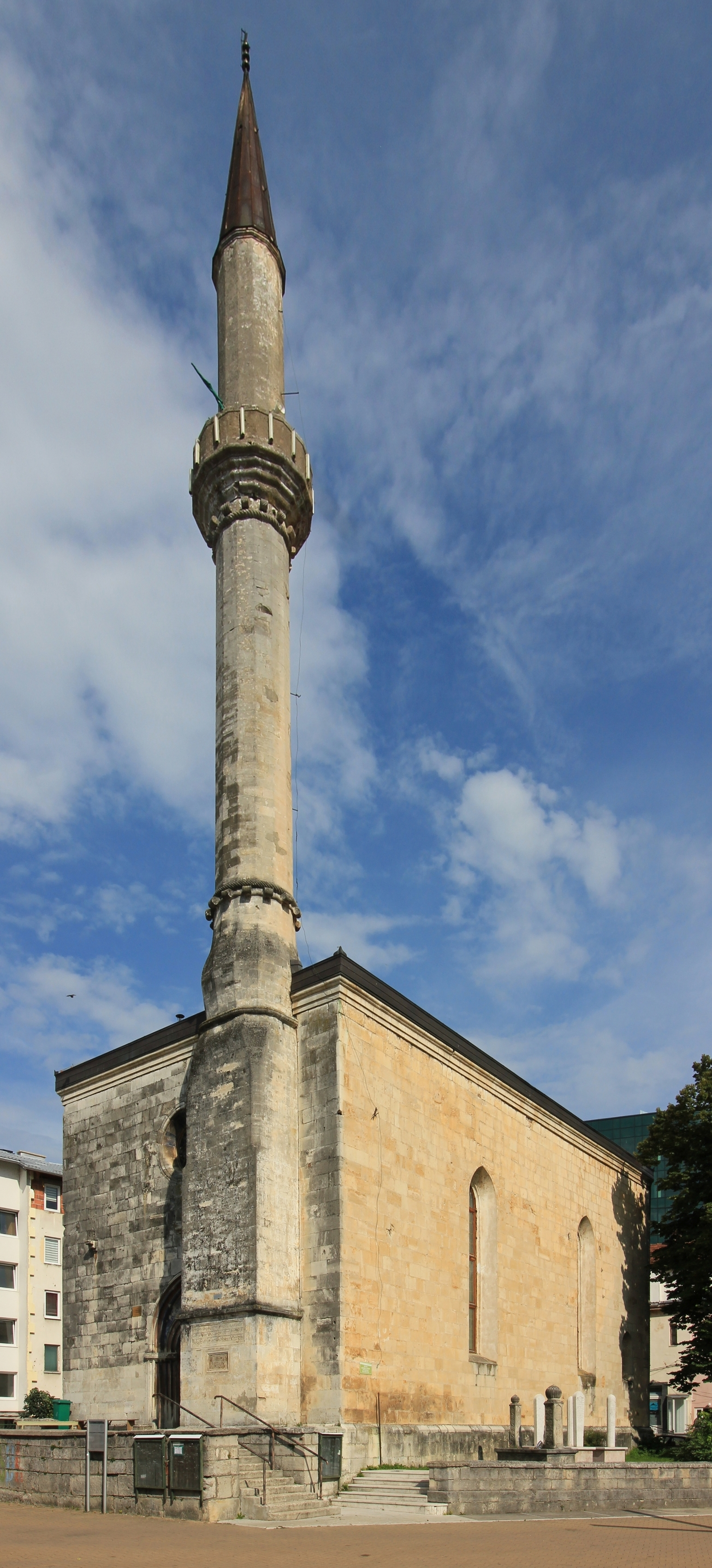
Fethija Mosque, former church of St. Anthony, 1266

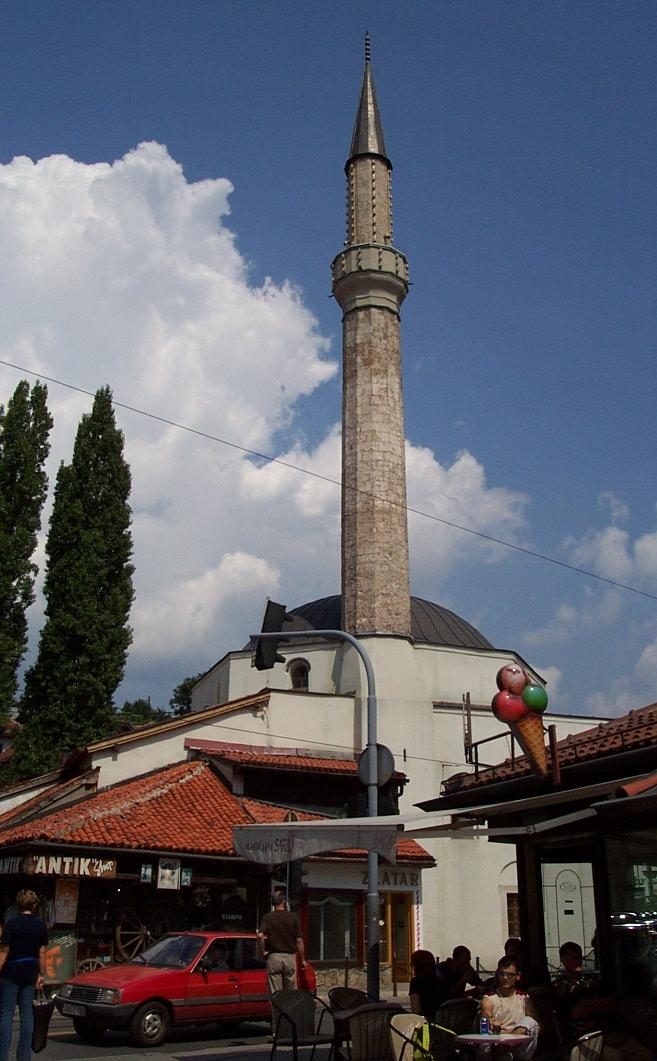
Muslihudin Čekrekčija Mosque, Sarajevo, 1526

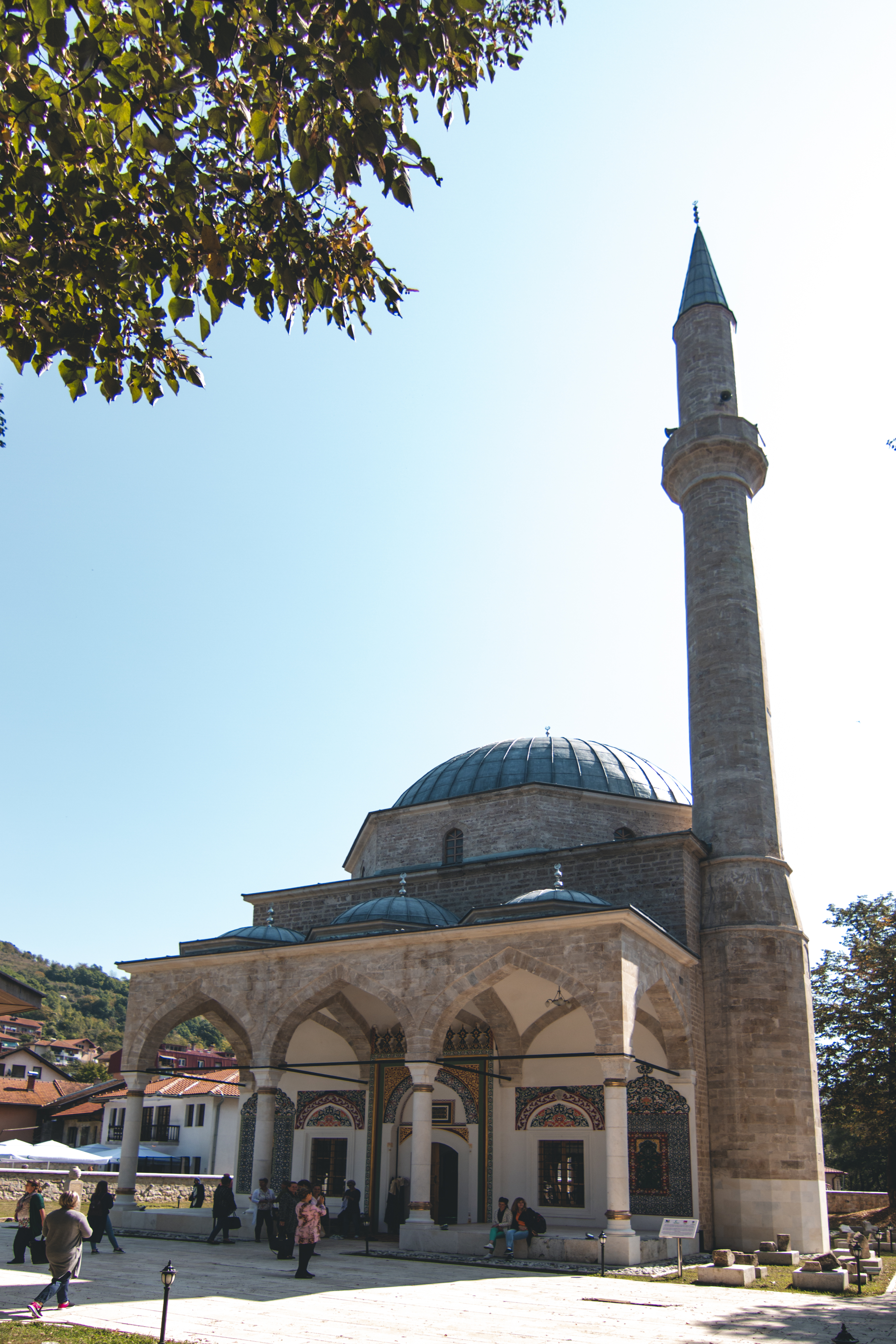
Aladža Mosque, Foča, 1550 (rebuilt 2018)

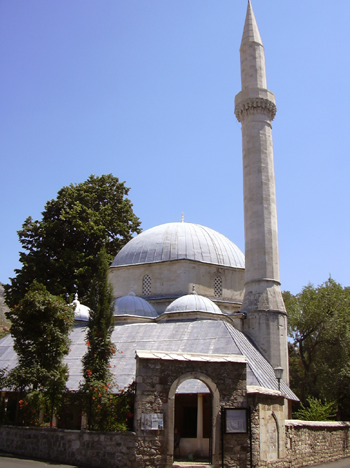
Karađoz-beg Mosque, Mostar, 1557

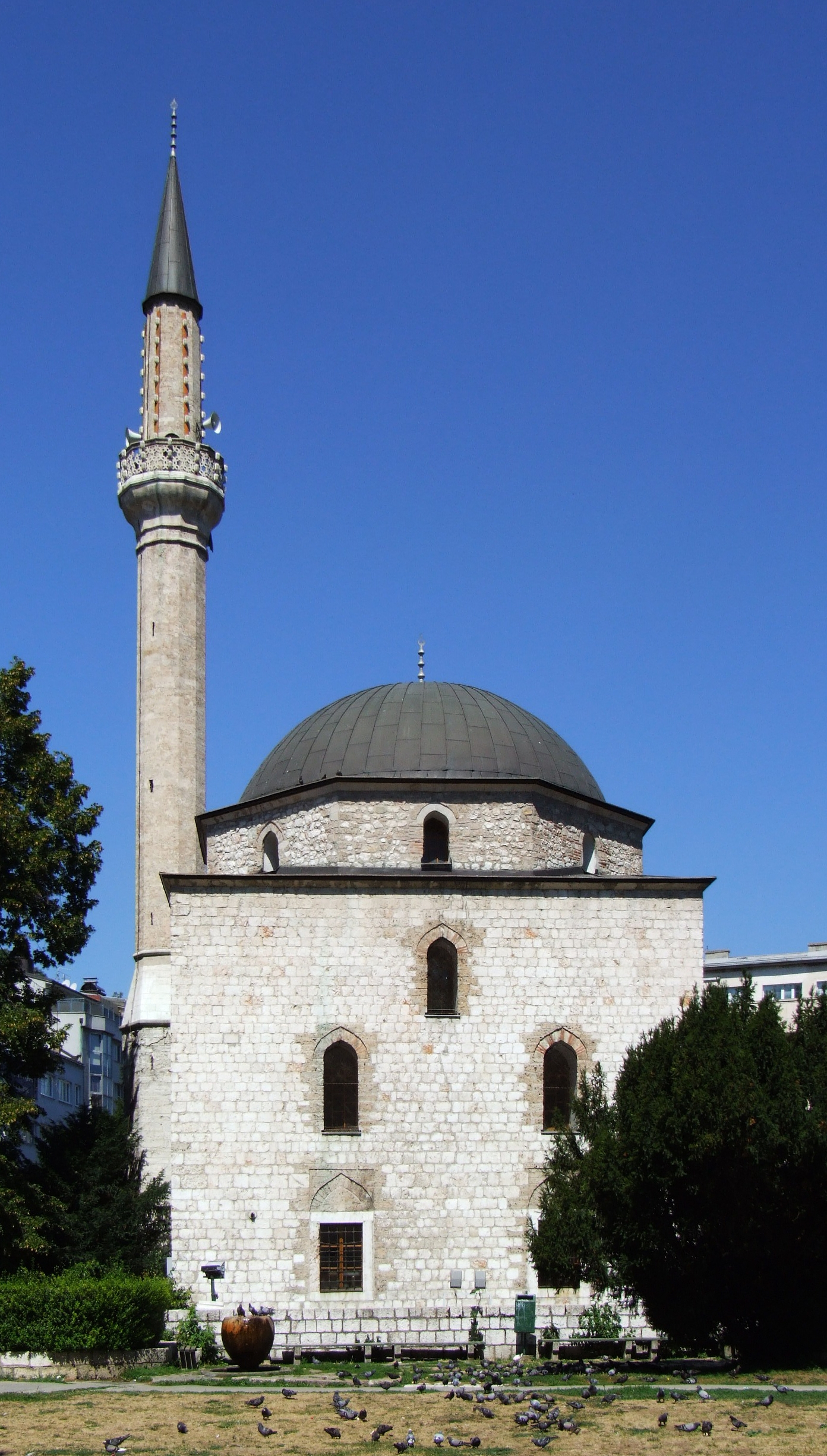
Ali-pasha Mosque, Sarajevo, 1560

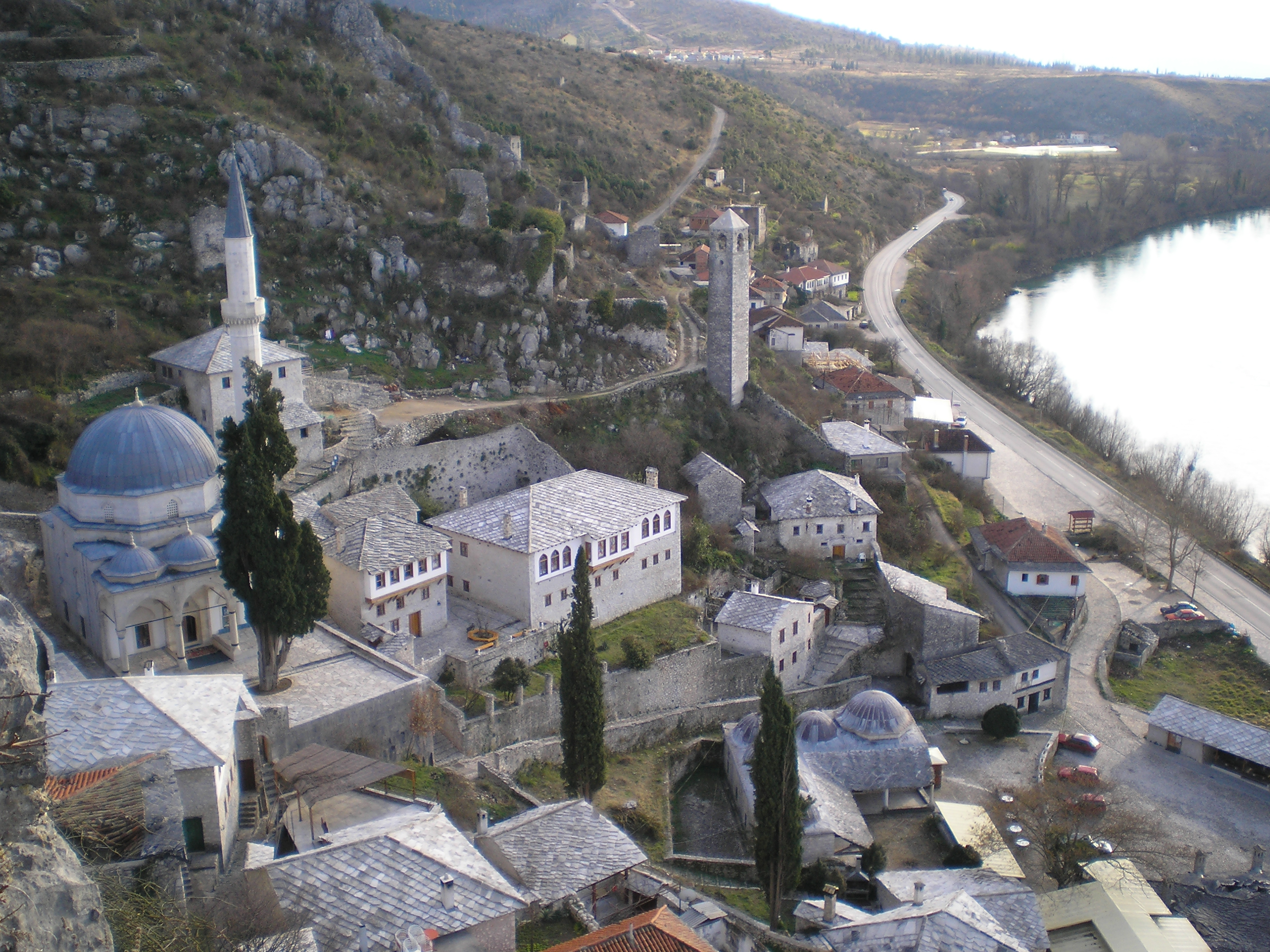
Šišman Ibrahim-pasha Mosque (Hadži Alijina Džamija), Počitelj, 1561

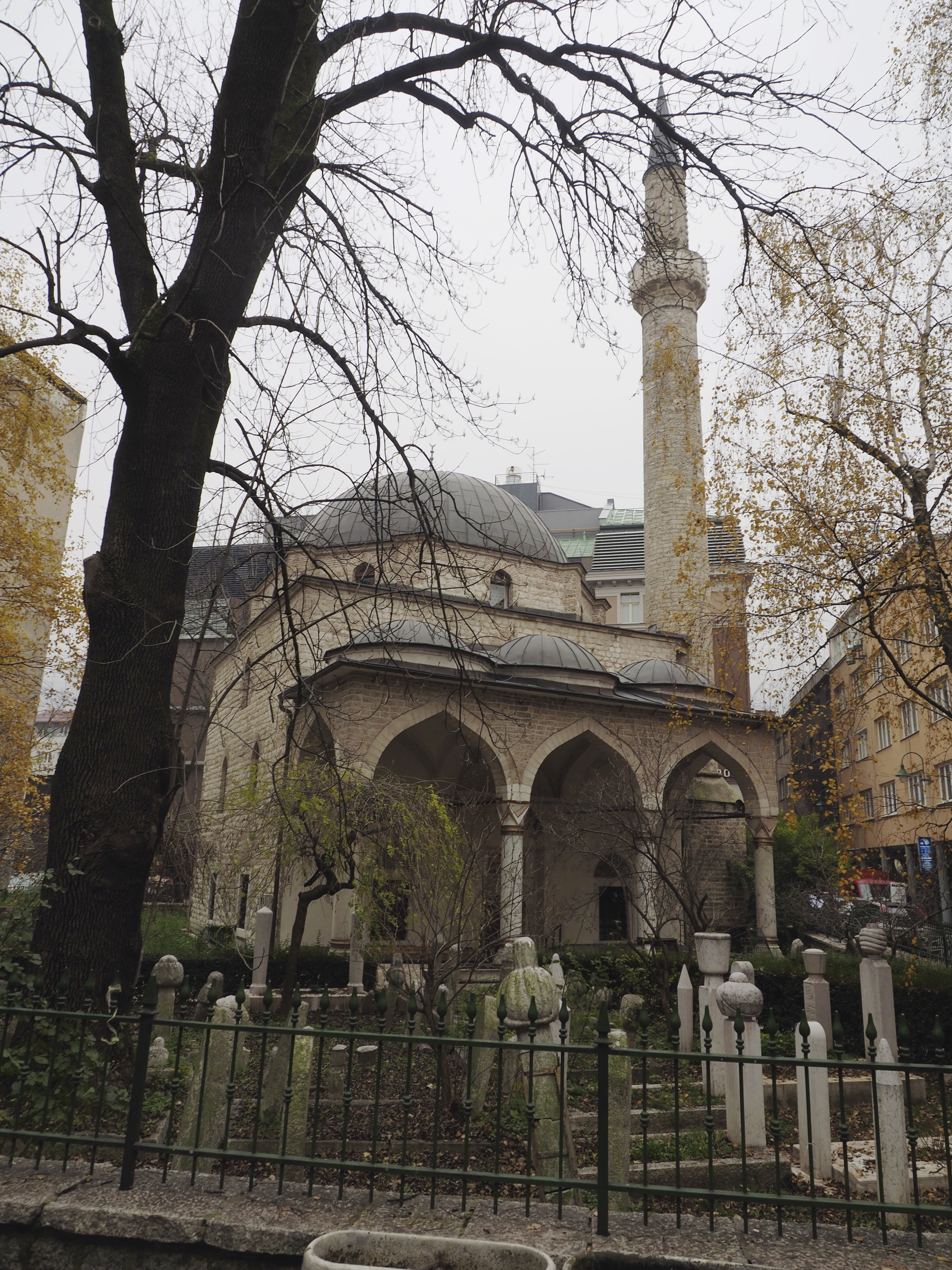
Ferhat-pasha Mosque, Sarajevo, 1562

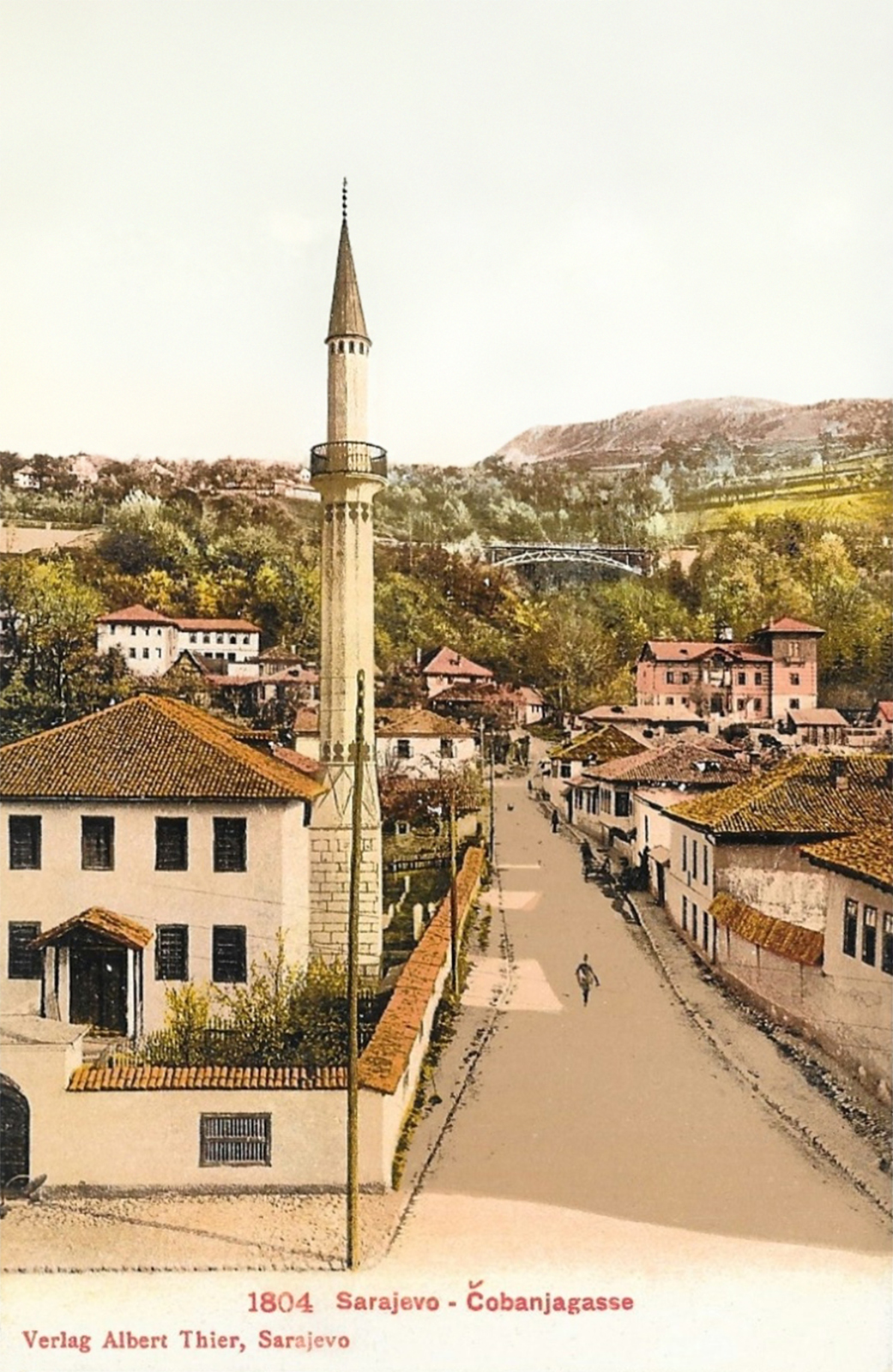
Čobanija Mosque, 1565

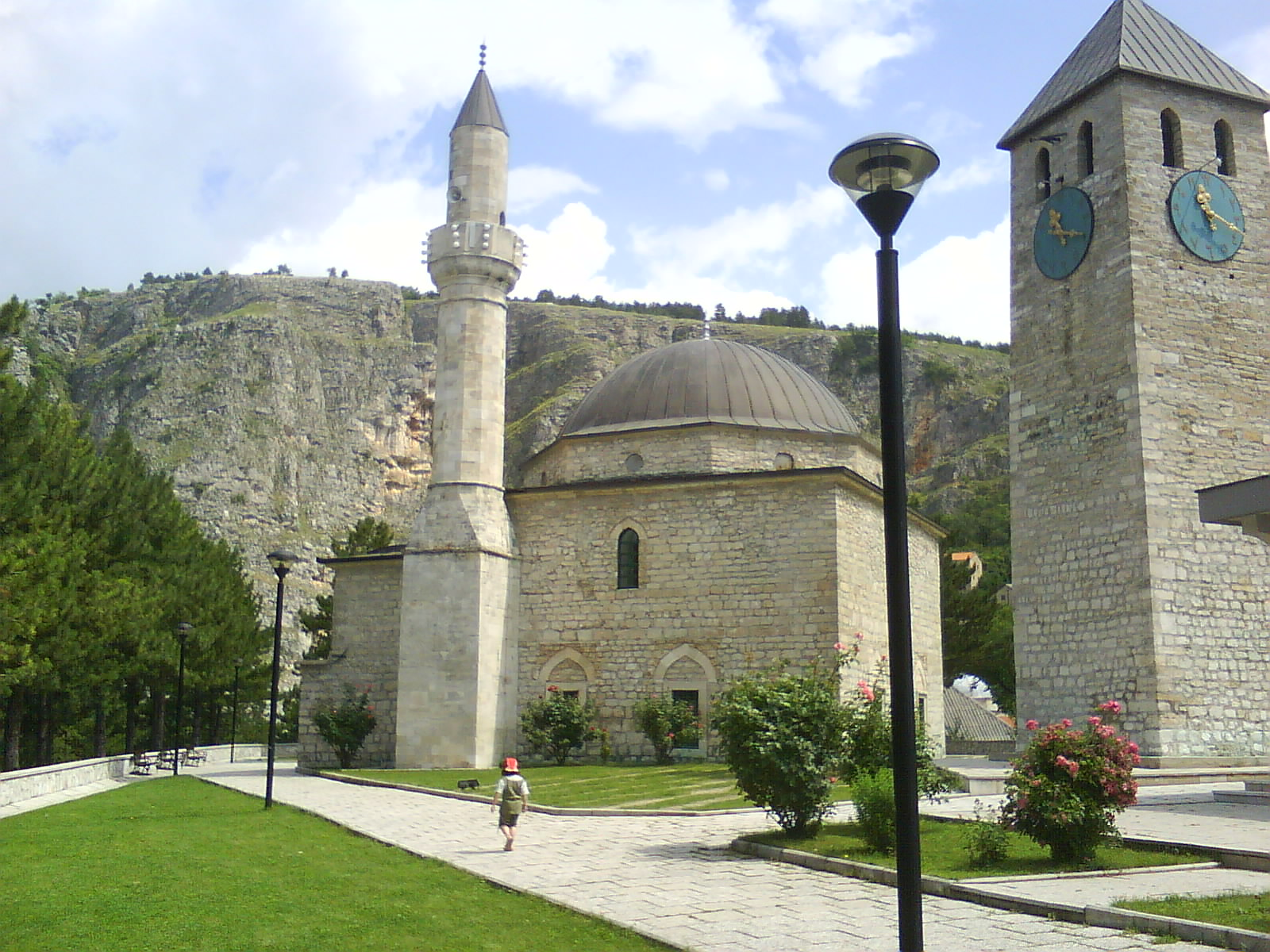
Hadži Ahmed Dukatar's Mosque, Livno, 1574

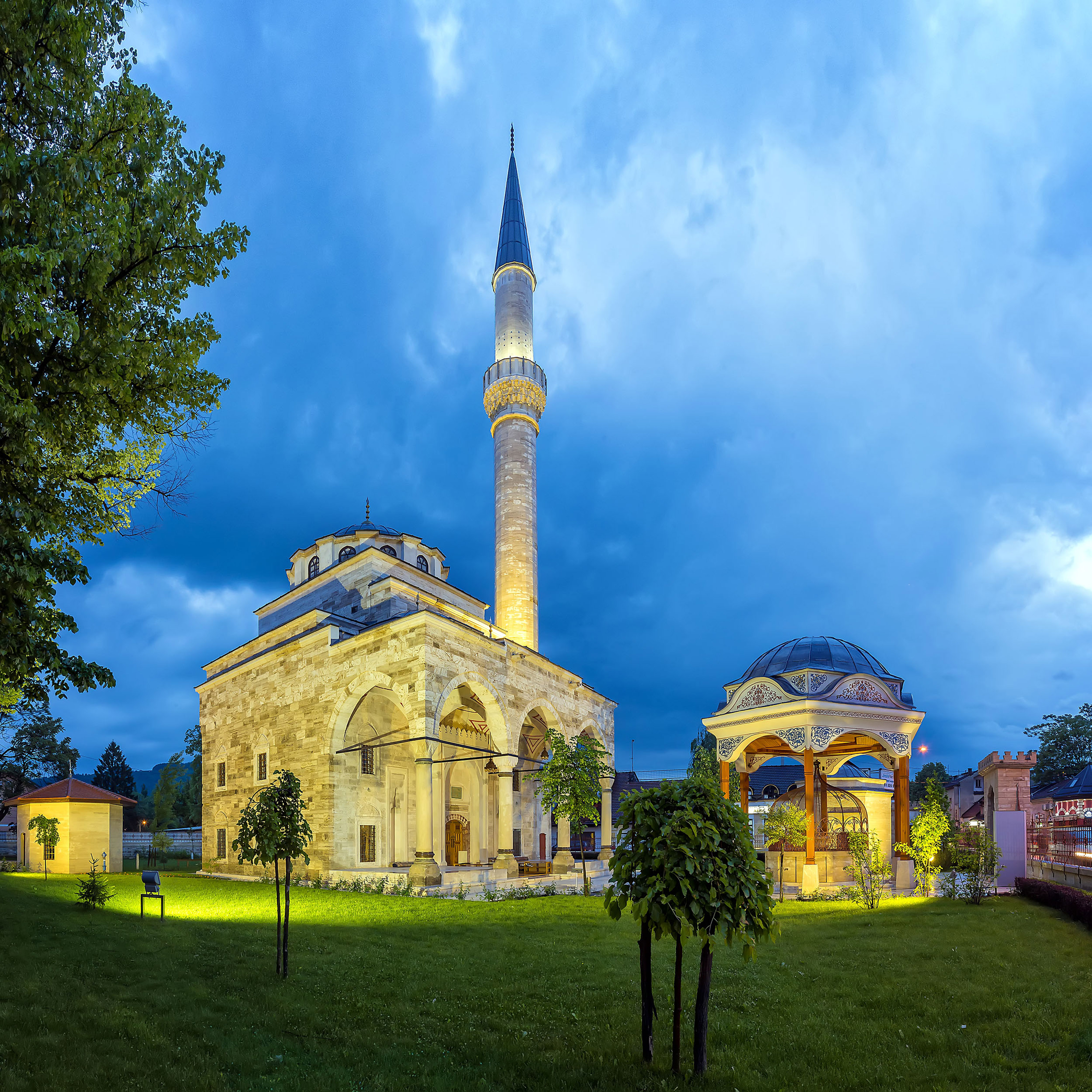
Ferhat-pasha Mosque, Banja Luka, 1579 (rebuilt 2016)

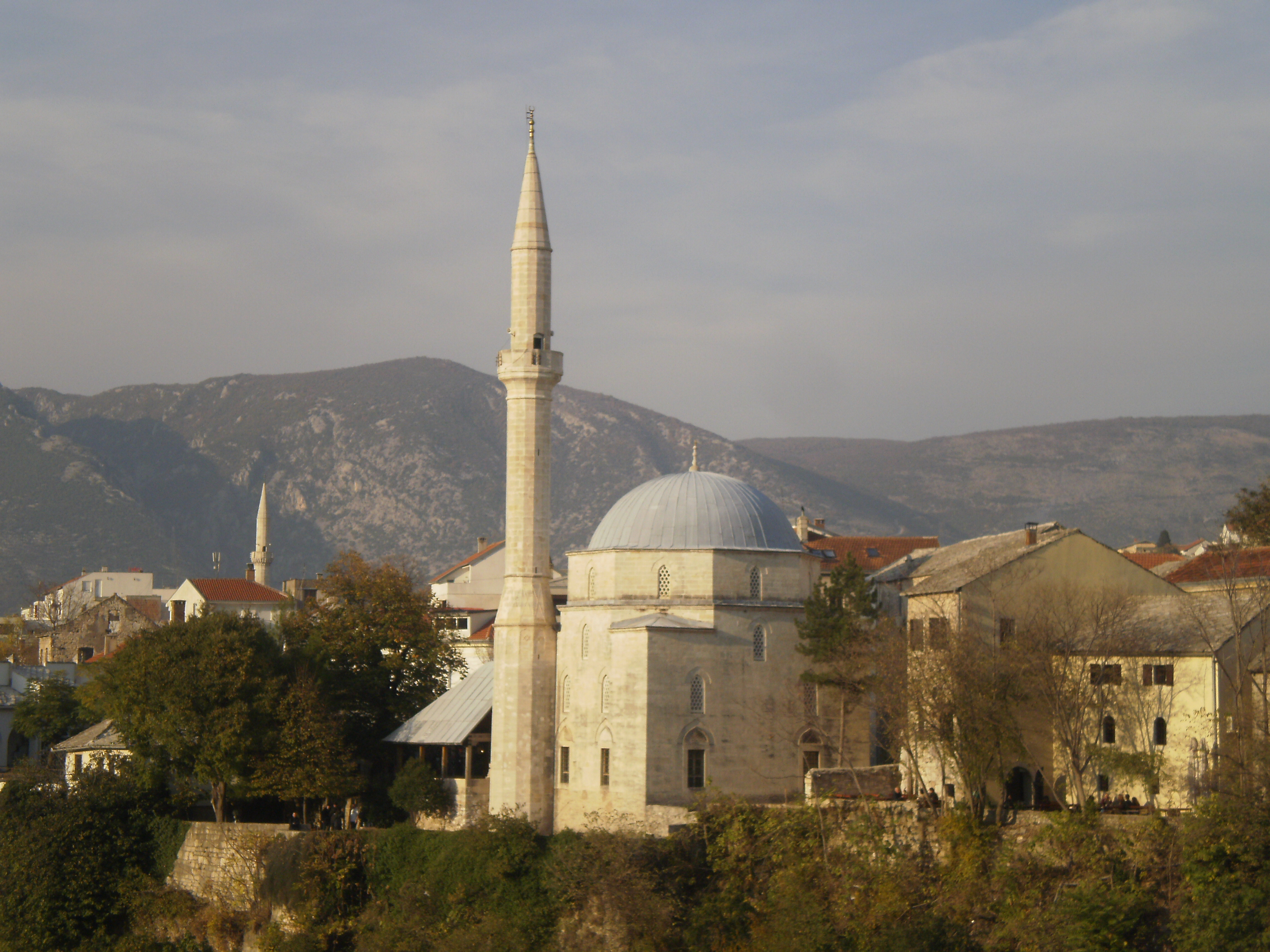
Koski Mehmed-pasha Mosque, Mostar, 1617

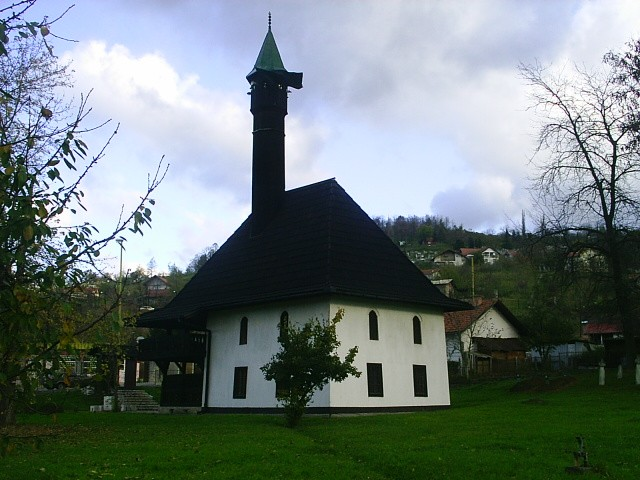
Džindijska Mosque (Huseina Čauša), Tuzla, 1708

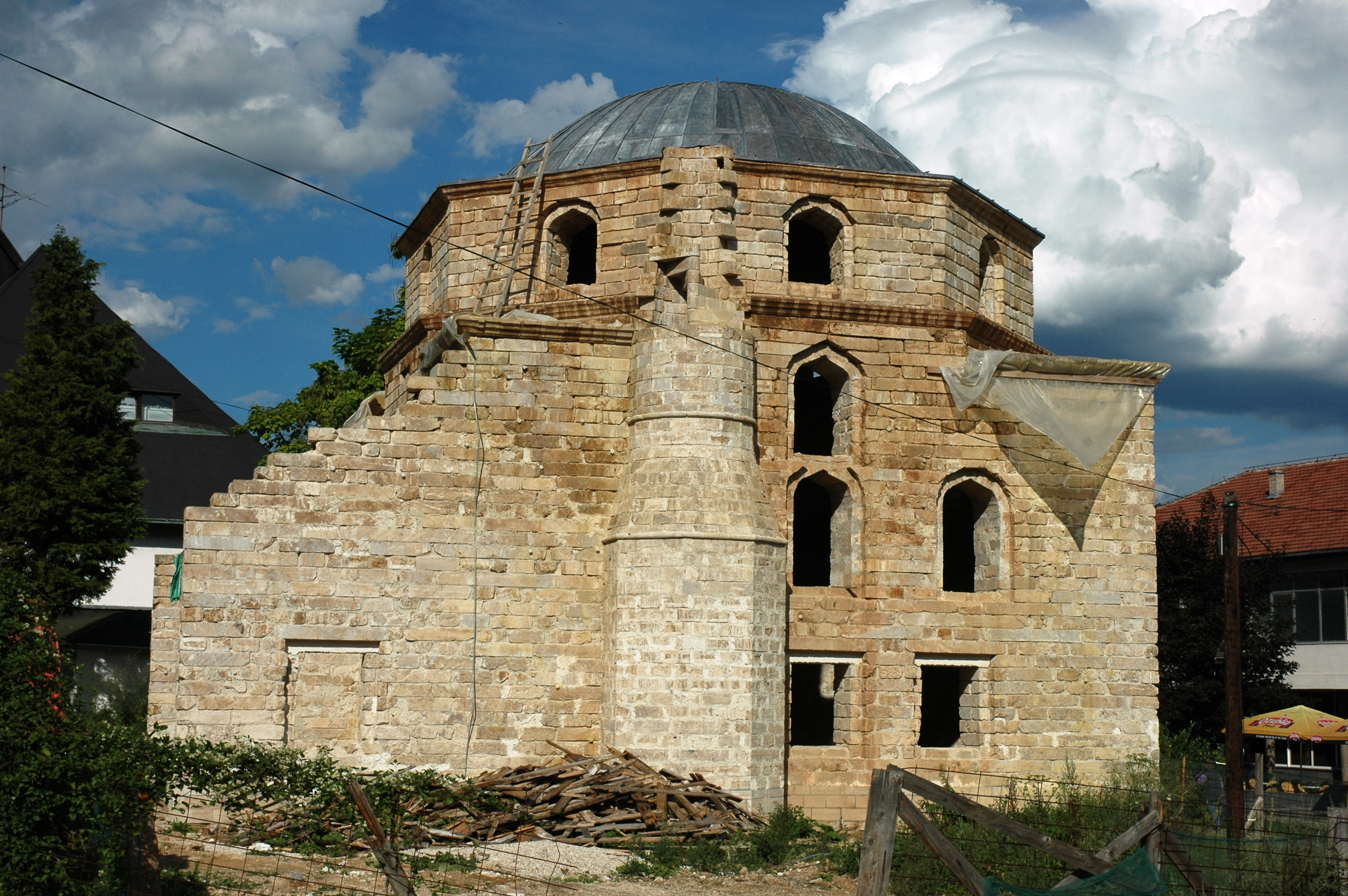
Esma Sultana Mosque (during reconstruction), Jajce, 1760

=== The Austro-Hungarian era ===
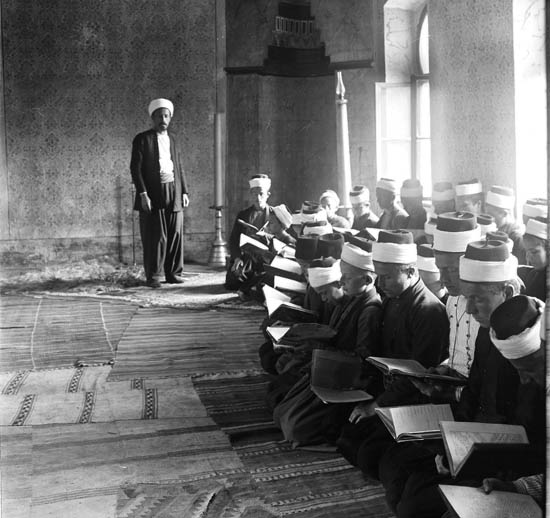
Bosnian Madrasa, ca. 1906

After the 1878 Congress of Berlin, Bosnia and Herzegovina came under the control of Austria-Hungary. In 1908, Austria-Hungary formally annexed the region. The Austro-Hungarian authorities made no attempt to convert or assimilate the citizens of this newly acquired territory. The December Constitution guaranteed freedom of religion, and so Bosnia and Herzegovina remained largely Muslim.

Bosnia, along with Albania and Kosovo were the only parts of the Ottoman Empire in the Balkans where large percentages of people converted to Islam, and remained there after independence. In other areas of the former Ottoman Empire where Muslims formed the majority or started to form the majority, those Muslims were either expelled, assimilated/Christianized, massacred, or fled elsewhere (Muhajirs).

=== The post-war period ===
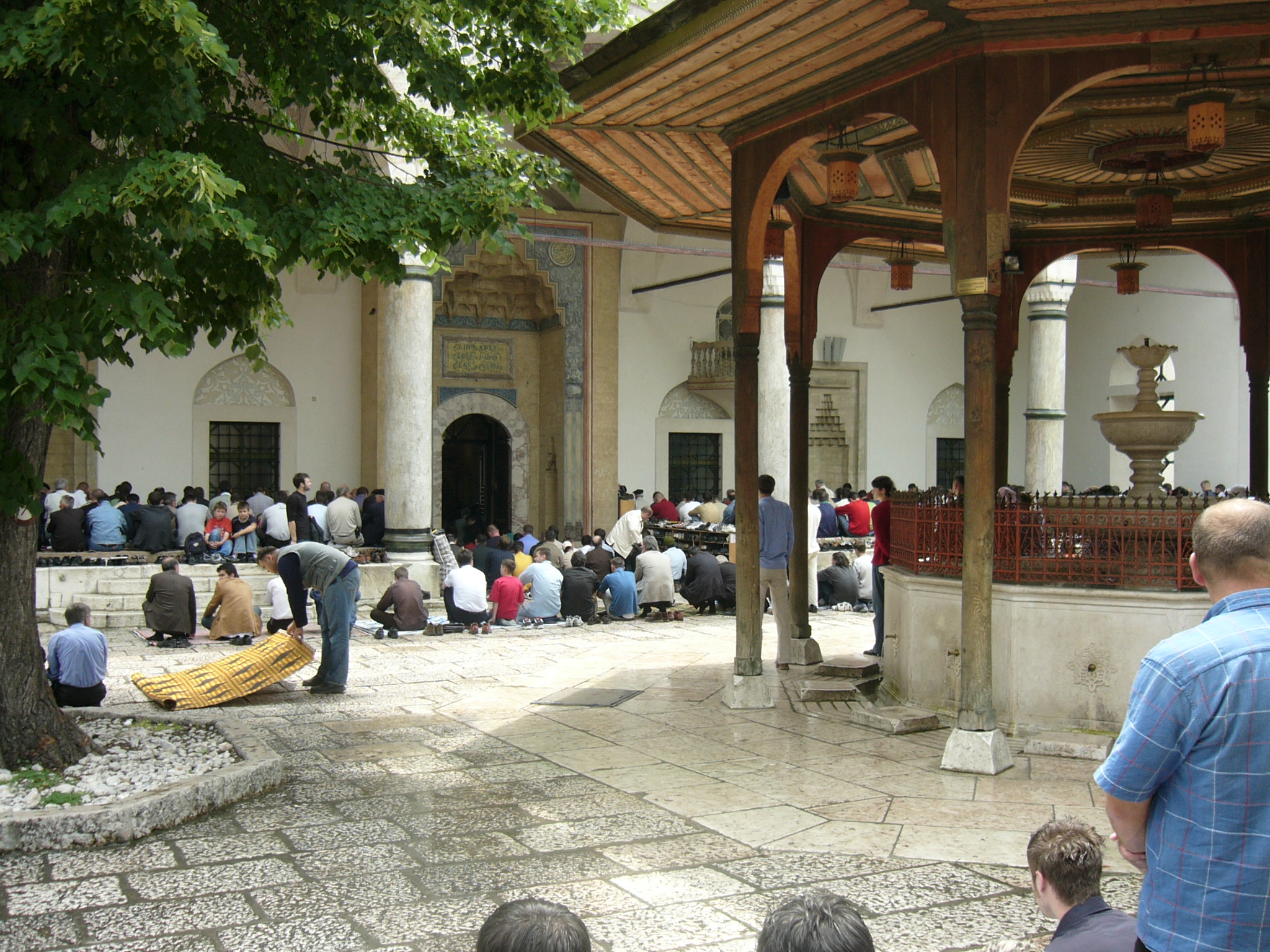
Gazi Husrev-beg Mosque in Sarajevo, Bosnia and Herzegovina

Many Islamic religious buildings were damaged or destroyed in the Bosnian War during the 90s, with up to 80% of well-over 4000 different buildings, and several mosques were rebuilt with the aid of funds from Saudi Arabia and other countries from the Middle and far East.

Historically, Bosnian Muslims had always practiced a form of Islam that is strongly influenced by Sufism. Since the Bosnian War, however, some remnants of groups of foreign fighters from the Middle East fighting on the side of Bosnian Army, remained for some time and attempted to spread Wahhabism among locals. With very limited success these foreigners only created friction between local Muslim population, steeped in their own traditional practice of the faith, and without any previous contact with this strain in Islam, and themselves.
Although these communities were relatively small and peaceful, restricted to a certain number of villages around central and northern Bosnia, the issue was highly politicized by local nationalists and officials, as well as officials and diplomats from countries like Croatia, Czech Republic and Serbia, to the point of outright fiction. The Security Minister of Bosnia and Herzegovina at the time, Dragan Mektić of the SDS, denounced such claims as inciting further politicization and even violence by falsely portraying Bosnian Muslims as radicals.

== Demographics ==
According to the 2013 census, there were 1,812,522 followers of Islam or Muslims, making up 51.33% of the population. (Note: The census regarded "Islam" and "Muslims" as separate categories; 1,790,454 or 76.59% declared themselves to be followers of Islam, while 22,068 or 0.62% declared themselves to be Muslims.)

Canton	Population (2013)	Number of Muslims	%
Federation of Bosnia and Herzegovina	2,219,220	1,581,868	71.3%
Tuzla Canton	445,028	395,921	89.0%
Zenica-Doboj Canton	364,433	303,994	83.4%
Sarajevo Canton	413,593	350,594	84.8%
Una-Sana Canton	273,261	252,758	92.5%
Bosnian-Podrinje Canton Goražde	23,734	22,372	94.3%
Central Bosnia Canton	254,686	147,809	58.0%
Brčko District	83,516	35,844	42.9%
Republika Srpska	1,228,423	172,742	14.1%
Herzegovina-Neretva Canton	222,007	91,395	41.2%
Posavina Canton	43,453	8,341	19.2%
Canton 10	84,127	7,904	9.3%
West Herzegovina Canton	94,898	780	0.8%
Bosnia and Herzegovina	3,531,159	1,790,454	50.7%

Percentage of Muslims by Population Census
Year	Number	Percentage
1871	630,456	51%
1879	448,613▼	38.73%▼
1885	492,710▲	36.88%▼
1895	548,632▲	34.99%▼
1910	612,137▲	32.25%▼
1921	588,244▼	31.07%▼
1931	718,079▲	30.90%▼
1948	788,403▲	30.73%▼
1953	891 800▲	31.3%▲
1961	842,247▼	25.69%▼
1971	1,482,430▲	39.57%▲
1981	1,630,033▲	39.52%▼
1991	1,871,882 ▲	42.78%▲
2013	1,812,522▼	51.33%▲

=== Ethnicity ===
Ethnic identification of the Muslim population in Bosnia and Herzegovina (2013 census)
1. Bosniaks (96.6%)
2. "Bosnians" (1.20%)
3. Romas (0.61%)
4. Albanians (0.12%)
5. Other (1.47%)

According to the 2013 census, 1,812,522 people of Bosnia and Herzegovina were followers of Islam comprising 51.33% of the population. The vast majority of Muslims identified as Bosniaks (1,751,980) followed by "Bosnians" (20,971) and included populations such as the Roma people (11,073 Romani Muslims), Albanians (2,349 Albanian Muslims) and others.

== Contemporary relations ==
For a majority of Bosniaks that identify themselves as Muslims, religion often serves as a community linkage, and religious practice is confined to occasional visits to the mosque (especially during Ramadan and the two Eids) and significant rites of passage such as aqiqah, marriage, and death. Headscarves for women, or the hijab, is worn only by a minority of Bosniak women, or otherwise mostly for religious purpose (such as the çarşaf for prayer and going to the mosque).

Religious leaders from the three major faiths claim that observance is increasing among younger people as an expression of increased identification with their ethnic heritage, in large part due to the national religious revival that occurred as a result of the Bosnian war. Leaders from the three main religious communities observed that they have enjoyed greater support from their believers since the end of the Bosnian war. On the other hand, however, the violence and misery caused by religious conflict has led a small number of Bosnians to reject religion altogether. This atheist community faces discrimination, and is frequently verbally attacked by religious leaders as "corrupt people without morals". According to the latest census, openly-declared atheists make up 0.79% of Bosnia's population.

In a 1998 public opinion poll, 78.3% of Bosniaks in the Federation of Bosnia and Herzegovina declared themselves to be religious.

In Bosnia and Herzegovina, there are eight muftis located in major municipalities across the country: Sarajevo, Bihać, Travnik, Tuzla, Goražde, Zenica, Mostar, and Banja Luka. The head of the Islamic Community in Bosnia and Herzegovina is Nedžad Grabus.

== See also ==
- Islamic Community in Bosnia and Herzegovina
- Islamization of Bosnia and Herzegovina
- Bosniaks
- Religion in Bosnia and Herzegovina
- Persecution of Muslims
- Pomaks
- List of mosques in Bosnia and Herzegovina
- List of National Monuments of Bosnia and Herzegovina
