= Estonian National Museum =

Museum in Estonia

Coordinates: 58.395645°N 26.745595°E

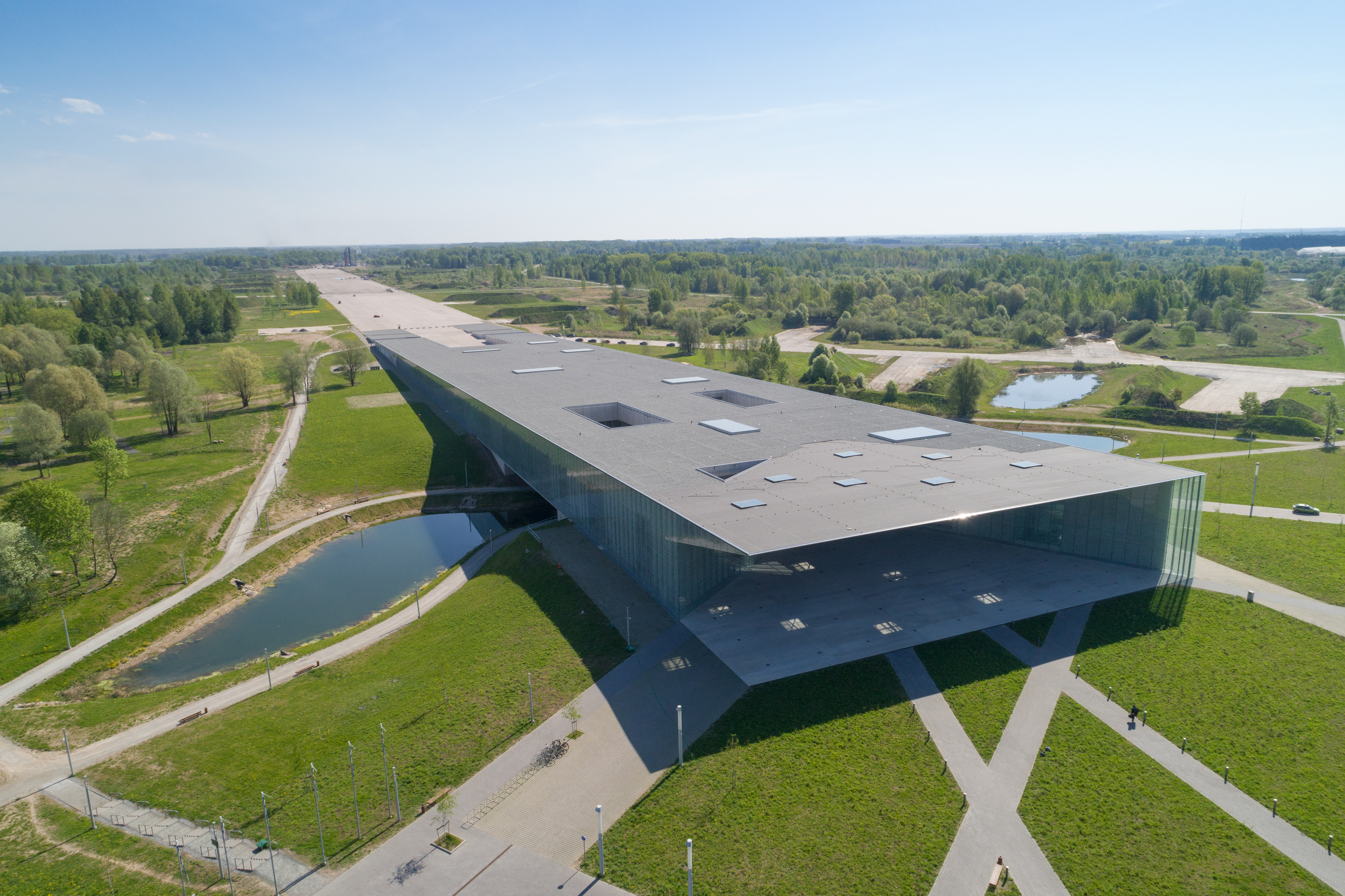
- Main building, opened in 2016
- Established: 14 April 1909
- Location: Tartu, Estonia
- Type: National museum
- Website: Official website

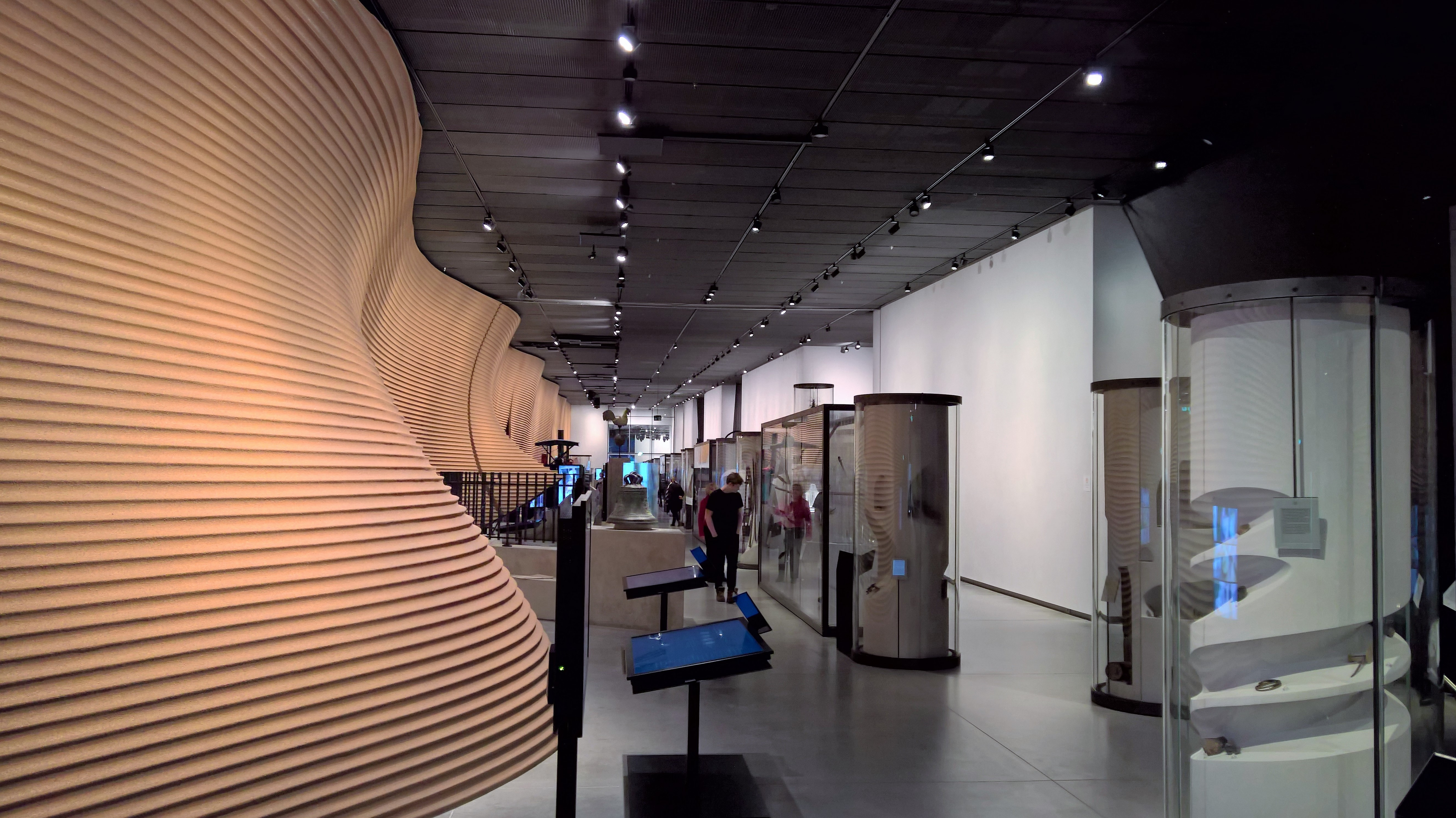
Inside the main exhibition hall (2016)

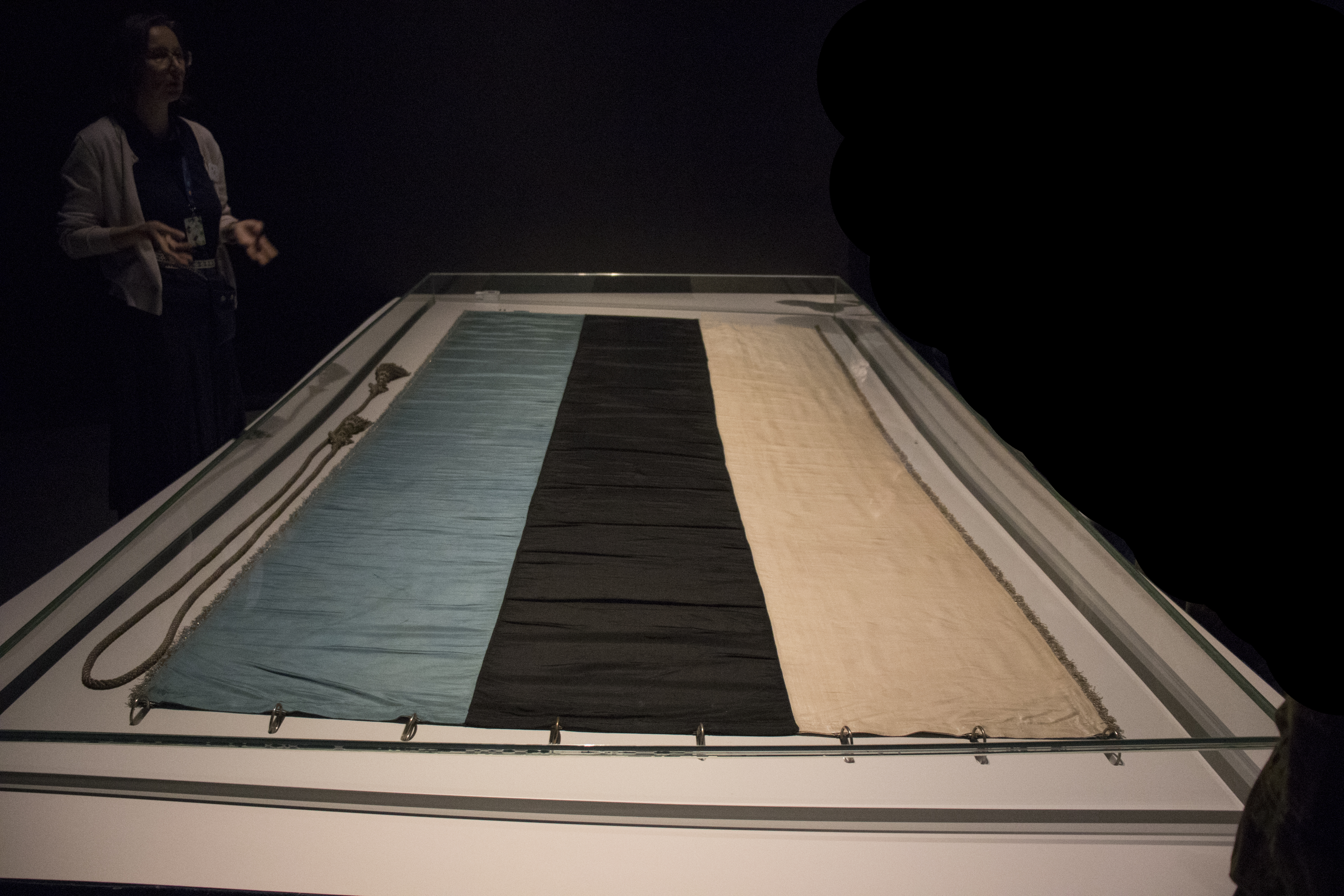
The first ever Estonian flag, made in 1884, now on display in the museum (2018)

The Estonian National Museum (Estonian: Eesti Rahva Muuseum) founded 1909 in Tartu is a museum devoted to folklorist Jakob Hurt's heritage, to Estonian ethnography and folk art. The first items for the museum were originally collected in the latter part of the 19th century.

The museum tracks the history, life and traditions of the Estonian people, presents the culture and history of other Finno-Ugric peoples, and the minorities in Estonia. It has a comprehensive display of the 19th century folk costumes from all regions of Estonia. The exhibition includes an extensive array of various handicrafts from hand-woven carpets and linen tablecloths to wood-carved beer tankards and other items illustrating the Estonian farmers' traditional lifestyle, fests and holidays.

== History ==
The museum opened at Raadi Manor in 1922 with the Finnish ethnographer Ilmari Manninen as its director. Manninen had been working for Tartu University since 1919. The manor had previously been home to a Baltic German art collector Karl Eduard von Liphart and his son Ernst Friedrich von Liphart. Although the Liphart family moved away from Raadi in 1860, most of their collections remained there until 1920s, despite some of the most valuable items having been sold in the meantime.

Raadi Airfield was built on the manor's land in 1940. Raadi Manor, the main building of the museum, was destroyed in the Tartu Offensive during World War II. The airfield became a Soviet military airbase and there was no space left for the museum's collection. In any case, from 1940 until 1991, during the period of Nazi German and Soviet occupations most of the museums's cultural artifacts were hidden from the authorities. The museum's artefacts were secretly stored in churches and spare spaces of people's homes and offices in and around Tartu.

In 2005, the Estonian Ministry of Culture and the Union of Estonian Architects announced together with the museum an international competition for the Estonian National Museum's new building. The project was won by an international collaboration of architects for the work Memory Field: Dan Dorell (Paris, France), Lina Ghotmeh (Paris, France), and Tsuyoshi Tane (Paris, France).

The grand opening took place in Autumn 2016. The new single storey building houses the museum as well as supplying conference space and a cinema. The building design incorporates the history of the site including the manor, the war and the airfield.

In August 2021, the then head of the museum, Alar Karis, was elected President of Estonia.
