= Abdullah Numan =

Dr. PhD, Th.D Abdullah Numan
- Абдулах Нуман
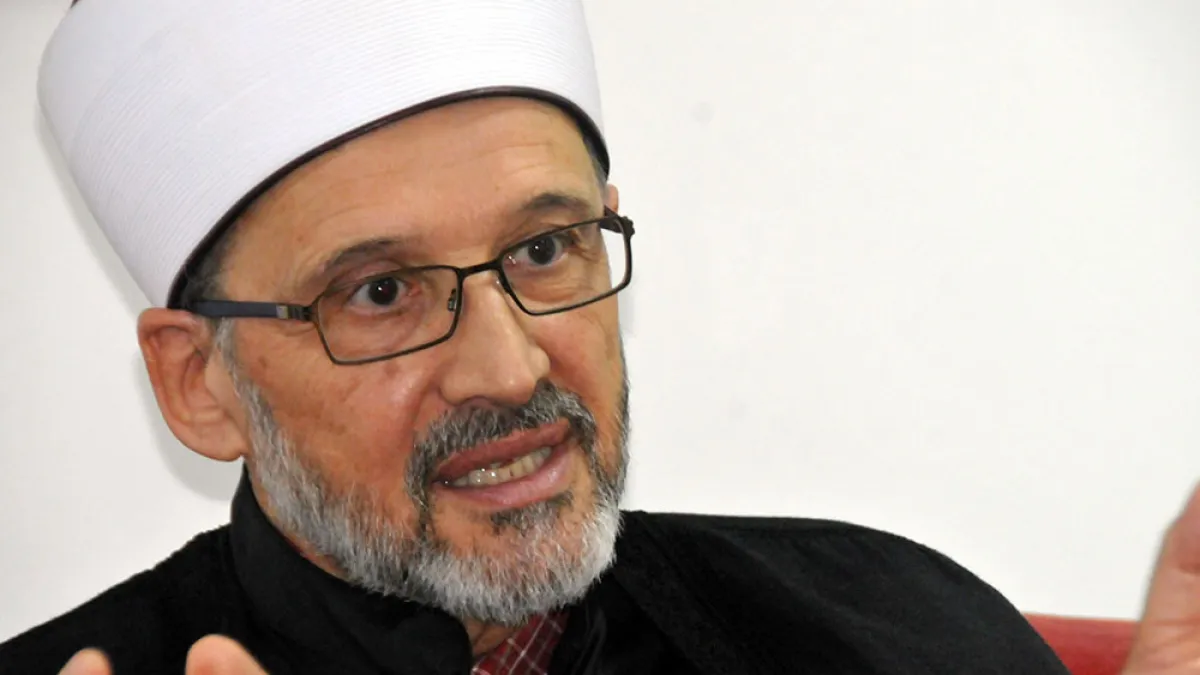
- Title: Mufti of Serbia

Personal life
- Born: Ivan Trifunović, 1950 (age 75–76) Belgrade, SR Serbia, SFR Yugoslavia
- Spouse: Razija Numan
- Children: 2
- Education: University of Melbourne

Religious life
- Religion: Islam
- Denomination: Sunni

Muslim leader
- Teacher: Hamdija Jusufspahić
- Present post: Mufti of Serbia
- Period in office: June 2016 – present
- Predecessor: Muhamed Jusufspahić

Abdullah Numan (Serbian Cyrillic: Абдулах Нуман; born 1950) (also spelled Abdullah Nu'man, Arabic: عبدالله نعمان) is a Serbian-Australian academic and Islamic cleric currently serving as Mufti of Serbia.

== Biography ==
Born in Belgrade, SR Serbia in 1950 as Ivan Trifunović into a Serbian Orthodox family.

Talking about the key moments that influenced him to choose Islam as a life path interview with Anadolu Agency "People's love for God, those who built mosques, had an impact on me. This coincided with the fact that I was surrounded by good people, and also the Muslims I saw in my life turned out to be exceptionally good people,"

His first contact with a Muslim was in 1969, with an Arab student in Belgrade's Republic Square, from whom he bought 300 dollars for a trip to India and who then taught him what fake dollars are.

This experience and love of the counter-culture inspired Trifunović and four friends to explore the orient, boarding a train first to Istanbul, reaching Nepal before they had depleted their funds. His friends returned home, whilst Trifunović having been deported from Nepal, embarked on a six-month journey throughout India, soon found himself with a Buddhist priest in Meroli, near New Delhi, where the highest minaret in the world, the Qutb minaret, is located. There he worked as a gardener, meditated, admired Islamic architecture and thought.

During his travels he underwent an Islamic conversion in Rajasthan, where he was conferred the Muslim name Abdullah Numan (also spelled Abdullah Nu'man, Arabic: عبدالله نعمان) .

"In those places, I found some spiritual peace and spiritual silence that separated me from everything around me, so that the noise of life and the human ritual that we humans invent to pray to God... that's where I managed to find something that my soul understood to be true, that's where I got that affinity for Islam, because of Islamic architecture"

"I said that I want to find the truth, wherever it is and however it shows itself to me, I will find it. I did not set myself that the truth must be through some specific religion, I am now a Muslim, thank God. I have that relationship where I want to live by my name Abdullah, it is my life's goal to be a slave of Allah. Because I love Allah and because he has shown himself to me as a benefactor who takes care of me and who showed me a path that I did not know existed. He showed it to me and he made me the way I am, I couldn't do it myself or invent it,"

Upon his returned from India, he encountered opposition to his conversion to Islam from family members, though his aunt and actress, Ružica Sokić did support his right to practice his faith and encouraged her nephews spiritual development.

"She always supported me and took care of me as if I were her child. She was a great helper in my life. She also loved us and she loved the mosque and came here. So at least some parts of my family managed to understand that Muslims are people, that they have a soul, that they are benevolent, that they are good to be around, that they are beautiful, honest and exemplary"

He began attending Bajraki Mosque soon befriending the then Mufti of Serbia, Hamdija Jusufspahić, who appointed him as his personal secretary, thus becoming his primary mentor.

His aunts were Ljubica "Cuca" Sokić, a prominent Serbian and Yugoslav painter of the twentieth century, and Ružica Sokić, a prominent Serbian actress.

Once competing compulsory military service in 1975, he married his wife Razija, from Melbourne whom he had met in Belgrade. The couple relocate to Melbourne where he graduated from four faculties in: Islamic studies, Philosophy, Sociology and Economic Management. He completed his postgraduate studies at the University of Melbourne in 1982 with the topic "Understanding God and His Names and Properties in Islamic Theology from Hassan al-Basri to Ghazali", later completing his doctoral dissertation on "The Concept of the Individual and Community in Islam".

Abdullah worked as a university lecturer in Australia before returning to Serbia. In June 2016 the Supreme Assembly of the Islamic Community of Serbia convened in Novi Pazar. Following a schism in the community the entire Riyaset of Serbia, headed by Reis-ul-ulema (Grand Mufti) Adem Zilkić, was dismissed. Sead Nasufović was appointed the new Reis-ul-ulema, whilst Numan was appointed to serve a five-year term as the Mufti of Serbia replacing Muhamed Jusufspahić.
