= Muhamed Jusufspahić =

Serbian diplomat and Mufti

- Мухамед Јусуфспахић
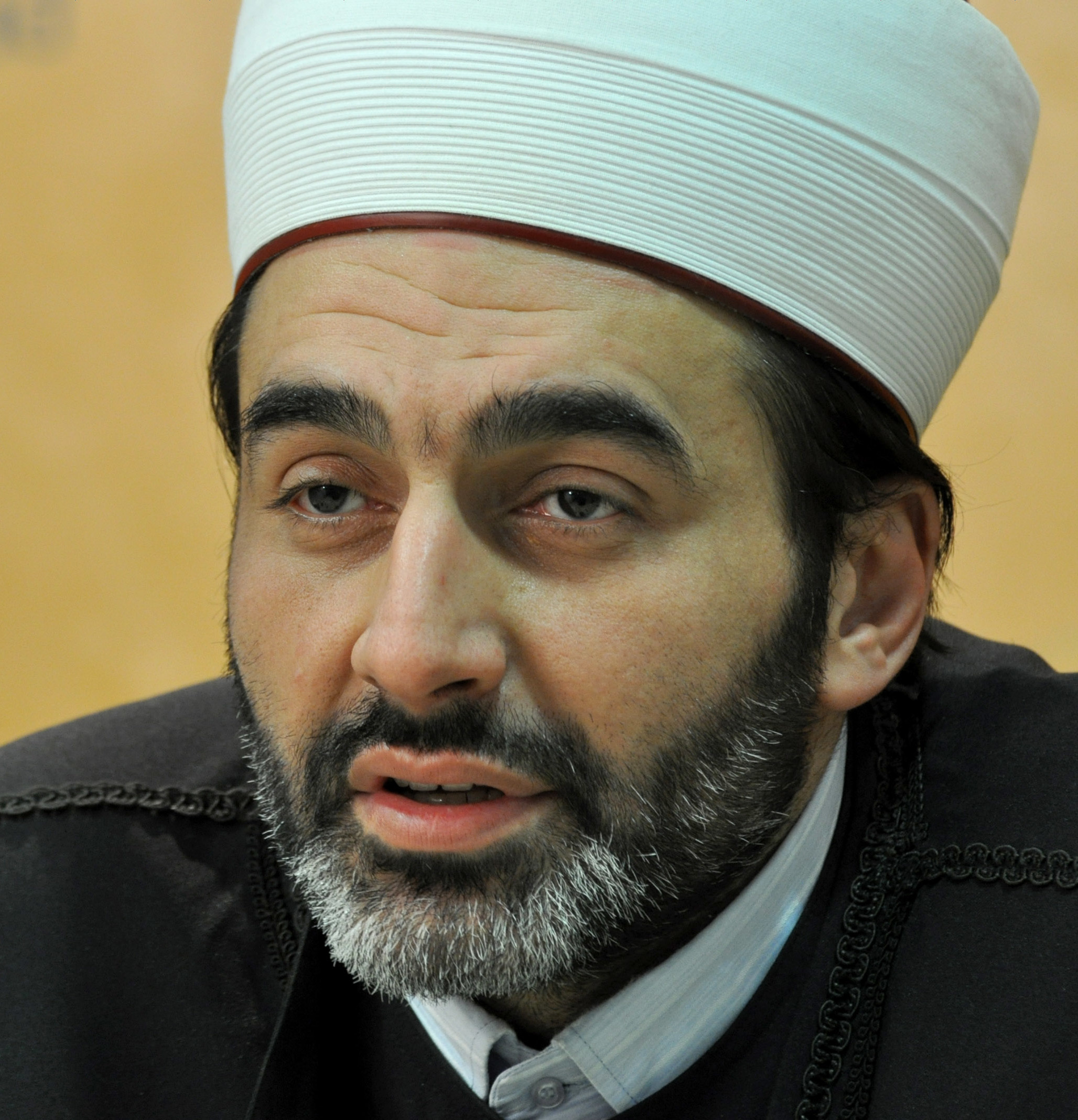

Ambassador of Serbia to Saudi Arabia
- Incumbent
- Assumed office 5 March 2018

Personal details
- Born: 28 November 1968 (age 57) Belgrade, SR Serbia, SFR Yugoslavia

Muhamed Hamdi Jusufspahić (Serbian Cyrillic: Мухамед Хамди Јусуфспахић; born 28 November 1968) is a Serbian Imam and diplomat serving as the Ambassador of Serbia to Saudi Arabia since 2018. Previously, he was the Mufti of Serbia, Mufti of Belgrade, and the Deputy Grand Mufti (Reis-ul ulema) of Serbia.

== Biography ==
Muhamed Jusufspahić was born in 1968 in Belgrade, which at the time was a part of the Socialist Federal Republic of Yugoslavia. He is one of the three children of Hamdija Jusufspahić, who at the time was the Mufti of Belgrade, and his mother Nabila, an Egyptian, who graduated in the first generation of the Islamic Faculty and was the first Islamic theologian in Yugoslavia.

He finished middle school in Belgrade, a madrasa (Islamic high school) in Sarajevo, the Faculty of Islamic-Arabic Sciences also in Sarajevo, and then he received his master's degree in Islamic studies in Cairo. In the early 1990s, he married a Serb woman, Gordana, with whom he has two sons, Amar and Ahmed, and a daughter, Sara.

He describes himself as a "Muslim by faith", a "citizen of Belgrade and Dorćol by birth", and a Serbian. He also stated that he speaks Serbian and that he is a Serbian patriot "who belongs to Allah", and that he was a personal friend of the late President Slobodan Milošević and a personal friend of Serbian Radical Party leader Vojislav Šešelj and former presidents Tomislav Nikolić and Boris Tadić. When it comes to the position of Muslims in Serbia, Jusufspahić believes that they are free in Serbia and enjoy all rights.

He succeeded his father Hamdija in 2008 as Serbian mufti. He performed this duty, as well as the duty of Deputy Reis-ul-Ulema of the Islamic Community of Serbia, until June 2016, when he was relieved of his duties at the session of the Supreme Assembly of the Islamic Community of Serbia held in Novi Pazar and unanimously elected President of the Supreme Assembly of the Islamic Community of Serbia. On that occasion, the entire Riyaset of the Islamic Community of Serbia, headed by Reis-ul-ulema Adem Zilkić, was relieved of duty. Abdullah Numan has been appointed the new Serbian mufti. The new mufti of Sandžak (Hasib Suljović) and the new mufti of Preševo (Nexhmedin Sqipi) were also elected. Until the election of the new reis-ul-ulema, it was decided that the Islamic Community of Serbia should be led by a commission composed of three muftis (Serbian, Sandzak, and Presevo). Sead Nusufović was elected the new reis-ul-ulema on July 2, 2016, and was solemnly enthroned at the Bajrakli Mosque in Belgrade.

During the official ceremony on March 5, 2018, Jusufspahić handed over a letter of credence to King Selman bin Abdul Aziz, a servant of two honorary temples, thus officially becoming the first ambassador of the Republic of Serbia to the Kingdom of Saudi Arabia.

== Relations within the Islamic Community of Serbia ==
When a schism within the Islamic community occurred in Serbia in 2007, the Islamic Community of Serbia with its headquarters in Belgrade, and the Islamic Community in Serbia, with its headquarters in Novi Pazar, were formed. At that time, Muhamed Jusufspahić was elected deputy reis-ul-ulema of the Islamic Community of Serbia, while his father Hamdija was elected reis-ul-ulema. When Hamdija Jusufspahić retired in 2008, he was appointed honorary reis-ul-ulema of the Islamic Community of Serbia, while Adem Zilkić was elected the new reis-ul-ulema.

Since 2007, there have been frequent conflicts between Muhamed Jusufspahić and Muamer Zukorlić, who has accused the Jusufspahić family of being responsible for the schism in the Islamic community. Muhamed Jusufspahić, on the other hand, points out that "the schism among Muslims was caused by those who divide them on the basis of ethnicity and turn them away from their native Serbia."
