= Islamic Community of Serbia =

Islamic organization in Serbia

- Islamska zajednica Srbije; Исламска заједница Србије
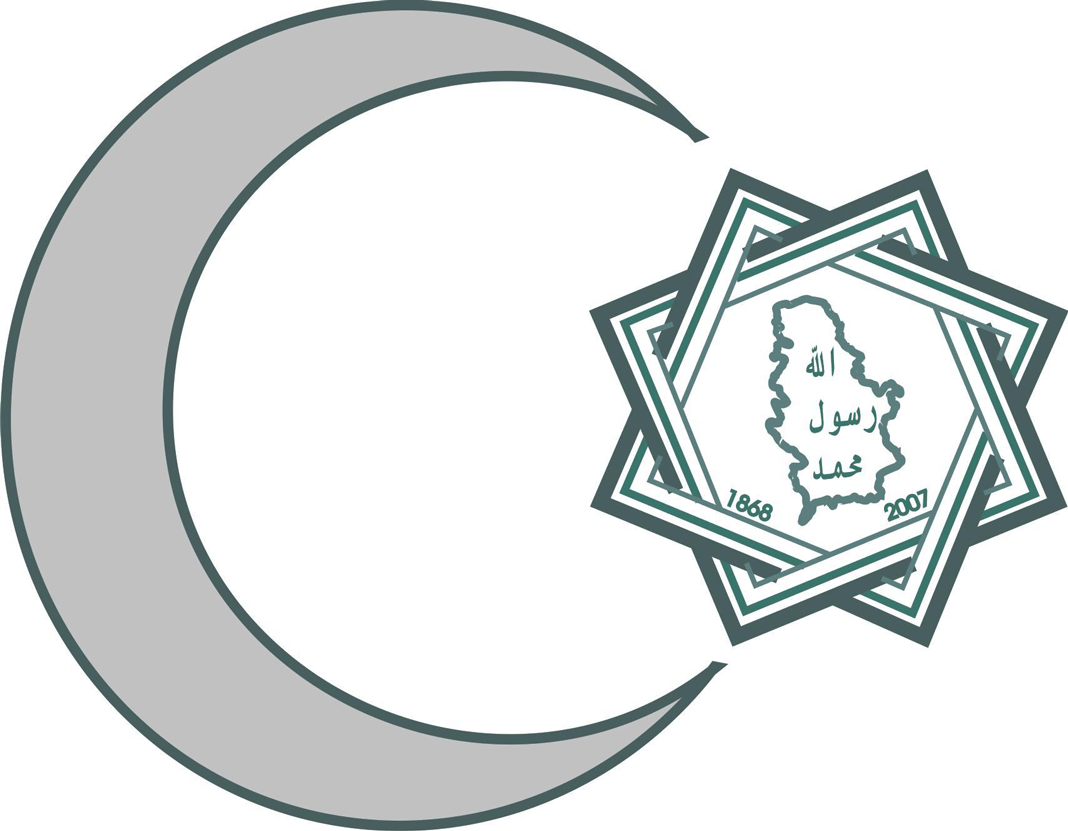
- Formation: 18 May 1868; 158 years ago
- Type: Religious organization
- Headquarters: Belgrade, Serbia
- Region served: Serbia
- Official language: Serbian, Arabic
- Reis-ul-ulema: Nedžmedin Saćipi
- Head of Parliament (Sabor): Muhamed Jusufspahić
- Main organ: Parliament (Sabor)
- Website: rijaset.rs

The Islamic Community of Serbia is a religious organization of Muslims in Belgrade. It is governed by Riyasat and headed by reis-ul-ulema.

== History ==
The Islamic Community developed following the withdrawal of Ottoman authority and the formation of the modern Serbian state, as Muslims began organizing their religious life within newly established legal and political frameworks. Islam was officially recognized in the Principality of Serbia by a decree of Prince Mihailo Obrenović and the State Council in 1868, and the Islamic Community gradually evolved as an autonomous religious organization under state supervision. The state undertook responsibility for financing imams and muezzins and maintaining the Bajrakli Mosque in Belgrade. The Law on the Organization of Liberated Territories (3 January 1879) guaranteed Muslims the right to freely practice their religion, equal to other legally recognized faiths.

Until the Balkan Wars, the seat of the Serbian mufti was in Niš. In 1909, Mehmed Zeki Efendi Ćınara was appointed mufti by shura of the Shaykh al-Islām, with jurisdiction over the entire Kingdom of Serbia. After the Balkan Wars, a decree of 18 August 1913 reaffirmed freedom of Islamic worship, while leaving internal organization to Islamic religious law. By 1914, Islam in Serbia was a legally recognized religion; Muslims formed a distinct religious community governed by their own religious regulations under state supervision, with material support from the state.

Following World War I, Muslims in the Kingdom of Yugoslavia were organized into three separate Islamic authorities: in Serbia (with the seat of the Grand Mufti moved from Niš to Belgrade), in Montenegro (with the seat in Bar), and in Bosnia and Herzegovina (headed by the Grand Mufti in Sarajevo). In 1919 a provisional regulation on waqf administration was adopted, replaced by law in 1922, uniting Muslims of Serbia and Montenegro under the Supreme Mufti in Belgrade, while Muslims in Bosnia and Herzegovina and other regions remained under the Sarajevo-based authority.

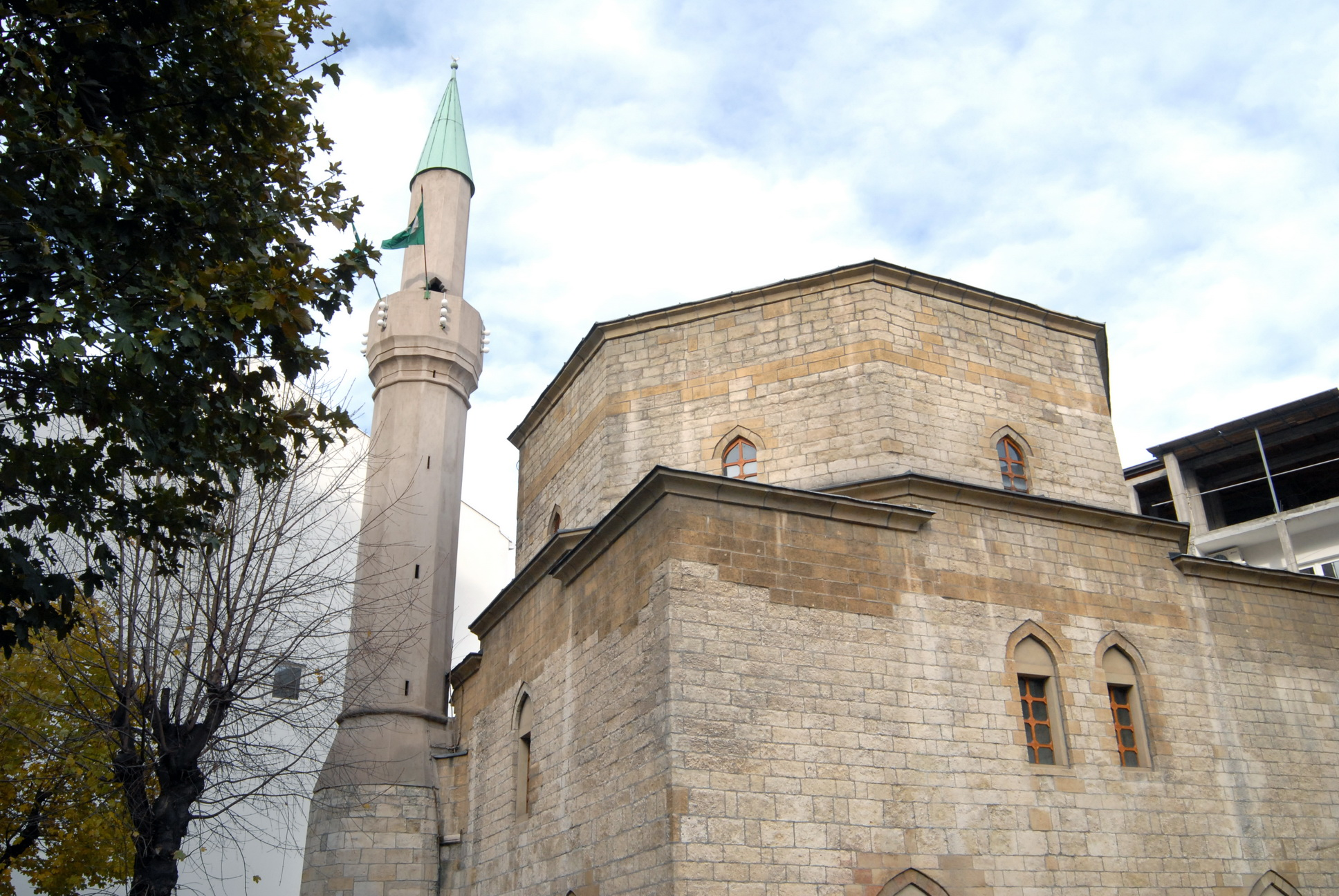
Bajrakli Mosque in Belgrade

The 1921 Constitution of the Kingdom of Yugoslavia guaranteed freedom of religion and equality of recognized faiths, including Islam. Full institutional unity of the Islamic Religious Community of the Kingdom of Yugoslavia was established by the Law on the Islamic Religious Community of 30 January 1930, which defined all Muslims in the kingdom as belonging to a single autonomous Islamic community headed by the Grand Mufti, with headquarters in Belgrade. The first Constitution of the Islamic Religious Community was adopted in July 1930. In 1936, amendments to the law abolished the muftiates and relocated the seat of the Grand Mufti back to Sarajevo.

After World War II, within socialist Yugoslavia, the Islamic Community of Serbia operated as part of the central Islamic Community of Yugoslavia, with the seat in Pristina. During this period, institutions and waqfs were gradually restored, including the reestablishment of the Belgrade muftiate with jurisdiction over most of Serbia. Following the dissolution of Yugoslavia, the republican authority ceased to exist, and the Islamic Community of Serbia was formally reconstituted at a renewal assembly in Niš in 1994. Since then, the community has continued its institutional development, including the establishment of educational institutions and local congregations throughout the country.

== Organization ==
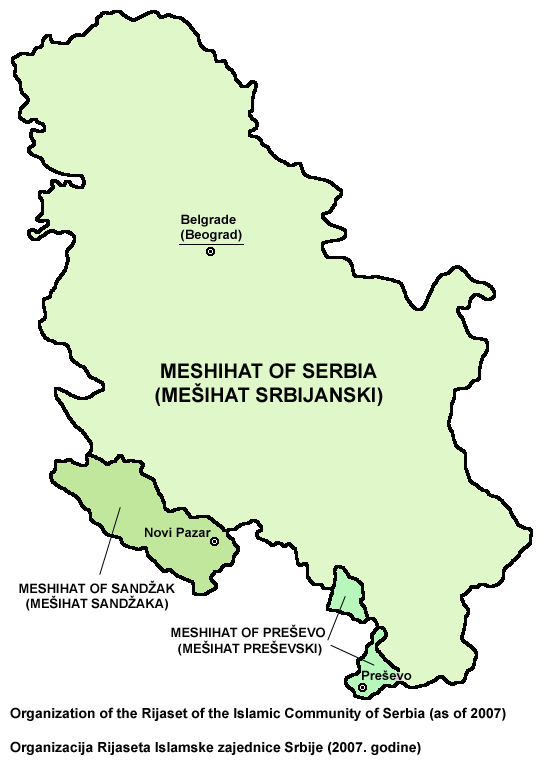
Territorial structure

The Islamic Community of Serbia, organised under its executive body known as the Riyasat (Rijaset), comprises a hierarchical system of meshihats, muftiates, and majlises that oversees religious life and administration within the country.

The central structure is the Meshihat of Serbia (Mešihat Srbijanski), which is divided into multiple muftiates responsible for administering Islamic life in regions: Belgrade, Vojvodina, Mačva-Podrinje, Niš, Šumadija, and Braničevo, each supervising local councils (majlises) and individual mosques or congregations. There are also separate regional authorities, including the Meshihat of Sandžak (Mešihat Sandžački) with local councils in areas such as Novi Pazar, Sjenica, Tutin and Prijepolje, and the Meshihat of Preševo (Mešihat Preševski) with councils in Preševo, Bujanovac and Medveđa, though these are contested by the Islamic Community of Kosovo.

== See also ==
- Islam in Serbia
- Islamic Religious Community of the Kingdom of Yugoslavia
- Islamic Community of Yugoslavia
