= Sokić =

Sokić (Serbian Cyrillic: Сокић) is a Serbian surname.

. Notable people with the surname include:

- Ljubica Sokić (1914–2009), Serbian painter
- Ružica Sokić (1934–2013), Serbian actress and writer
- Sreten Sokić (born 1945), Serbian political scientist, economist, businessman, and professor
