= Muhtasib =

Islamic supervisor of bazaars and trade

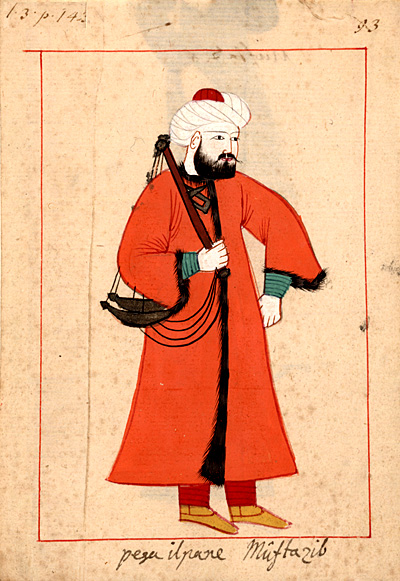
"Muhtasib weighs the bread", from the Rålamb Costume Book, 1657

A muḥtasib (Arabic: محتسب, from the root حسبة ḥisbah, or "accountability") was "a holder of the office of al-hisbah in classical Islamic administrations", according to Oxford Islamic Studies. Also called ‘amil al-suq or sahib al-suq, the muḥtasib was a supervisor of bazaars and trade, the inspector of public places and behavior in towns in the medieval Islamic countries, appointed by the sultan, imam, or other political authority. His duty was to ensure that public business was conducted in accordance with the law of sharia.

Hisbah, the office and root of muḥtasib, is an Islamic doctrine referring to "enjoining good and forbidding wrong" of shariah law, and "by extension, to the maintenance of public law and order and supervising market transactions". But whether muḥtasibs devoted themselves to hisbah frequently or vigorously in every region of the Muslim world, or focused instead on the orderly function of the marketplace, regulating weights, money, prices (though sometimes collecting bribes), is disputed.

== Terminology ==
According to Sami Hamarneh, in "religious terminology", hisbah "denotes providing for ... for oneself, or seeking reward in life to come for a good deed." It acquired another meaning sometime early in the 9th century" as "a religious position or bureau the aim of which was to carry out" enjoining good and forbidding evil.

=== Volunteers ===
At least one scholar (Willem Floor) distinguishes the muḥtasib, officials who in Islamic law are following "fard 'ayniyya [political duty]" and mutatawwi ("true believers" or volunteers who follow fard kifaya [individual duty] of Islamic law to take "the initiative to see to the upholding of the requirements of the law and the hisbah".

=== Personal duty ===
Another related definition of Hisbah is not as an official function with any special connection to marketplaces, weights and measures, etc.; but as a "personal" duty of Muslims enjoined in Quranic verses such as 3:110 and 9:71, to right wrongs "committed by fellow believers, as and when one encountered them." It was "mainly an invention" of Al-Ghazali" (d.1111). Al-Ghazali also used the term muhtasib, but to refer to "the one who performs hisba" -- a forbidder of wrong in general and not specifically a functionary overseeing marketplaces -- leading to some confusion, according to historian Michael Cook.

A large "scholastic heritage" on the subject of who was to do the forbidding, what was to be forbidden, and whom was to be told there actions were forbidden, was developed by Al-Ghazali and other medieval scholars.

== Literature ==
While most of the literature describing of the function of muhtasib that scholars use comes from two sources: the "theoretical writings on the role, function, and tasks of the muhtasib", and from "practical manuals to guide the muhtasib in his work in a particular place and time".

One of the earliest and most influential manuals for a muḥtasib is the Nihāyat al-rutba fī ṭalab al-ḥisba by Abd al-Rahman ibn Nasr ibn Abdallah al-Shayzari (d. 1193). Another example of book on hisbah (by a famous scholar (Ibn Taymiyya) translated as Public Duties in Islam the institution of the Hisba) that as one review put it, not only "delineates the duties of the Muhtasib" but preaches that it "is not just the commercial behavior of the Muslims that needs to be regulated, but also their behavior to God", and that fraud in business transactions is not wrong because it "was "judged 'immoral,' but because such behavior stemmed from a distorted notion of the deity and, therefore, violated the basic tenets of Islam".

Manuals written specifically for instruction and guidance in the duties of a Muḥtasib and that the Muḥtasib often relied on were called ḥisba; they contained practical advice on management of the marketplace, as well as other things a muhtasib needed to know — for example, manufacturing and construction standards.

Another source, though much more limited in volume, is especially important in understanding what Muḥtasib did. Sources, usually historical and geographical, "which occasionally refer to the existence of a muhtasib, his activities", are valuable because they "tell us how the muhtasib really was, not how he ought to be".

== History ==
Some examples of how widespread Muhtasib was in Islamic history are that "in Persia, the function of the mutasib continued to operate in a fashion practically unchanged until the 16th century, and in Egypt it existed until the reign of Muhammad Ali, the founder of the Khedive dynasty. Moreover, it was renewed in the Ottoman Empire in 1855, and in the Republic of Syria in 1925".

=== Connection with pre-Islamic world ===
According to authors Cahen and Talbi, writing in the Encyclopaedia of Islam, "it is now commonly accepted that the function of muhtasib in Islamic countries is the direct successor of that of the Byzantine agoranomo", i.e. overseer or market inspector. (Note: Another author, Benjamin Foster, disputes that agoranomo was the direct predecessor and maintains we do not know for sure the official title of the market inspectors in the Byzantine cities up to the Arab conquest, although he states there were "many remarkable parallels between the development of the agoranomia and the hisba, and does not deny there were market inspectors in the Byzantine cities up to the Arab conquest.) Willem Floor writes that "we ... know that the market overseer existed" in [pre-Islamic] Parthian (247 BC – 224 AD) and Sassanian Iran (224–651 CE). "We know that this official, who was referred to as agoranomos, existed in Babylonia, Seleucia, and Dura".

Floor notes that the societies conquered by early Muslims had market inspectors similar to muhtasib; that the muhtasib technical manuals that dealt with the market inspection "came into being earlier than those" that put the office of hisba "in its religious-judicial context"; and that the general historical and geographical Islamic sources that mention the muhtasib's tasks indicate these were primarily market supervision, as in real life the medieval muhtasib either didn't have much to do with moral and religious tasks or "just didn't bother with them", as according to sources describing life in the Muslim world, un-Islamic activities like "begging, vagrancy, gambling, castrating, using the mosques for eating, sleeping, giving verdicts, and disturbing the performance of the daily prayers", pigeon flying, making music, were less than rare occurrences in the jurisdiction of muhtasibs in medieval Baghdad, Seljuq, Ilkhan, Timurid, Safavid Afshars, Zands, and Qajar periods .

Floor argues that the all this may be explained by Islamic legal scholars (fuqaha) taking "the existing institution" of market inspector and imposing a "religious-judicial ... conceptual framework" on it to add enforcement of Islamic law to the list of their duties.

=== Early Islam ===
According to Islamic tradition, the first persons with jurisdiction over the markets in Mecca and Medina, were appointed by the Islamic prophet Muhammad. Muhammad engaged Saʿid b. Saʿid b. al-As over the suq (Arab for marketplace) of Medina sometime after the conquest of Mecca (629 AD). Later, Rashidun ('Rightly Guided Caliph') Umar also had "two men working for him over the suq of Medina". One of whom used the title ʿAmil ʿalā Sūq.

During the Umayyad period there were reports of four market inspectors, including those covering the sūq of Mecca for Ibn al-Zubayr, sūq of Wāsit under the governor of Iraq and the East for Yazld II. The market inspector in Umayyad dynasty in Spain was called Sāḥib al-Sūq.

According to R.P. Buckley, "it is during the early years of the Abbasid Caliphate that the first Muhtasibs are mentioned." Buckley states that "some later commentators" tell stories implying that the hisba duties of the Mutasib were undertaken by the early caliphs (such as Umar and Ali), (Note: what he calls "a pious wish" of the commentators) suggesting that they, not the ʿAmil ʿalā Sūq market inspectors, handled religious duties, and that later renaming the official Muhtasib "was intended to indicate ... an Islamicizing of the post".

=== Medieval Muslim World ===
According to Oxford Islamic Studies, the office of muḥtasib, in classical Islamic administrations, fell "roughly between" that of judge (qadi) and court magistrate". Unlike a qadi, he "had no jurisdiction to hear cases—only to settle disputes and breaches of the law where the facts were admitted or there was a confession of guilt".

In the reign of the Sultan Barqūq, for example, the duties of the muḥtasib of Cairo included "the regulation of weights, money, prices, public morals, and the cleanliness of public places, as well as the supervision of schools, instruction, teachers, and students, and attention to public baths, general public safety, and the circulation of traffic." The muhtasib or muhtesip was authorized to audit the businesses if they were selling their products at the price limits set by the government. In addition, craftsmen and builders were usually responsible to the muhtasib for the standards of their craft. The muhtasib also inspected if the food sold was safe and the measuring equipment was accurate.

"The Muḥtasib also inspected public eating houses. He could order pots and pans to be re-tinned or replaced; all vessels and their contents had to be kept covered against flies and insects... The Muḥtasib was also expected to keep a close check on all doctors, surgeons, blood-letters and apothecaries."

After 1500 C.E, the muhatsib was almost exclusively responsible for ensuring that the weights and measures used in the market were fair and consistent.

According to Ahmed Ezzat, there are "three common features shared by all ḥisba treatises, from Yahya ibn ‘Umar to Mamluk Egypt":

1. "the market, street, mosque, bathhouse, or funeral, was the main spatial focus of ḥisba";
2. "although the muḥtasib was urged to first advise the wrongdoer to cease the reprehensible act, in most instances he also was authorized to use physical force against the individual";
3. the aim of a ḥisba punishment was not only to correct deviant behavior in one individual, but also public deterrence.

==== Departure from the ideal ====
However, after 950 C.E. (in the Buyids of the Abbasids) the office of the muhtasib (along with offices such as qadi (judge), and sahib al-shurta (chief of police)), was for sale. In 961 CE the office was sold for 20,000 dirhams per month. Based on the fact that the office holders would very likely want to recoup the large sum of money they were paying, and that the historical literature of this time indicated it was "clear" that "the muhtasib had a bad reputation in general", Floor speculates bribes were solicitated to "get back" their monthly payment. Nizam al-Mulk writes that the muhtasib "must take particular care ... that moral and religious principles are observed", and since scholars of Islamic law would have particular expertise in this regard, it would make sense that muhtasib would often be someone learned in Islamic "moral and religious principles". However, according to Willem Floor, this was not "the normal practice". An example being the Shi'ite poet Ibn al- Hajjaj, who was muhtasib of Bagdad, was at the same time one of the most notorious authors of sexually explicit poetry". Nizam al-Mulk, grand-vizir and de facto ruler of the Seljuk empire from 1064 to 1092, categorically stated: "the post [of muhtasib] always used to be given to one of the nobility or else to an eunuch or an old Turk." In Safavid times the muhtasib was "as unpopular a figure as had been his predecessors in earlier periods," accepting presents and bribes, and it was said one "could neither expect good nor profit from the muhtasib."

=== Egypt ===
In Mamluk Egypt, muḥtasibs were appointed by the sultan to inspect marketplaces and monitor the honesty of merchants. According to Kristen Stilt, "muḥtasibs in Cairo markets had a stand (dikka) from which they observed and whipped those who cheated when weighing their goods". "Muḥtasibs were instructed to parade cheaters" before the public as both punishment and deterrence against cheating by other merchants. The manuals of the Muhtasib included "information on merchants’ tricks."

In 1837, Mehmed Ali (aka Muhammad Ali of Egypt) "issued a siyāsa code" (a legislative order) that "completely abolished the muḥtasib offices in Cairo and Alexandria and transferred their duties to police and the health administration" in those two cities.

=== South Asia ===
Under Aurangzeb, the last of the great Mughal emperors, Emperor of India from 1658 to 1707, muḥtasibs were in contrast to polities to the west, "censors of morals", enforcers of "increasingly puritanical ordinances" by the militant orthodox Sunni Muslim emperor. They worked to destroy "Hindu idols, temples, and shrines" in the majority Hindu country, saw that the Muslim confession of faith, "was removed from all coins lest it be defiled by unbelievers", and that forbade from saluting in the Hindu fashion.

=== Russia ===
Among the Tatars of the Russian Empire, the möxtäsip was a Muslim official responsible for ensuring the observance and enforcement of Sharia law. Following the October Revolution, and amid the Soviet government's suppression of religious institutions, the office of the möxtäsip was abolished in the 1920s.

==== Post-Soviet Russia ====
Today, in Russia and a number of former Soviet republics, a muhtasib is a regional representative of a spiritual board (muftiate). The office of a muhtasib is called a muhtasibat. There were about 44 muhtasibats in Tatarstan as of 2002.

=== Modern times ===
The position appears to have disappeared in the nineteenth century, as law enforcement across the Muslim world underwent modernization. In Pakistan, the Mohtasib is an Ombudsman, responsible for the prosecution and redressal of grievances against federal or provincial government functionaries.

=== Qajar dynasty in Iran ===
In Iran, the muḥtasib was abolished in Shiraz around 1852, in Isfahan, in 1877. In Tehran it lived on as the idara-yi ihtisa losing its "police and judicial functions and developed into a city cleaning department" that was "sold" each year to the highest bidder. While city dust removal carried on, the "definitive end" of the ihtisab came with its abolition in 1926 following the fall of the Qajar dynasty.

== See also ==
- Muhtasibat
- Mufti
- Muftiate
- Qadi
- Qadiyat
- Sahih Muslim: his collection of authentic hadith

== Notes ==
=== Family Name ===
With variant spellings as Muhtasib, Muhtaseb, and Montase, the Muntaseb family is a Muslim family in Palestine in the city of Hebron
