= Sead Nasufović =

Reis-ul-ulema of Serbia

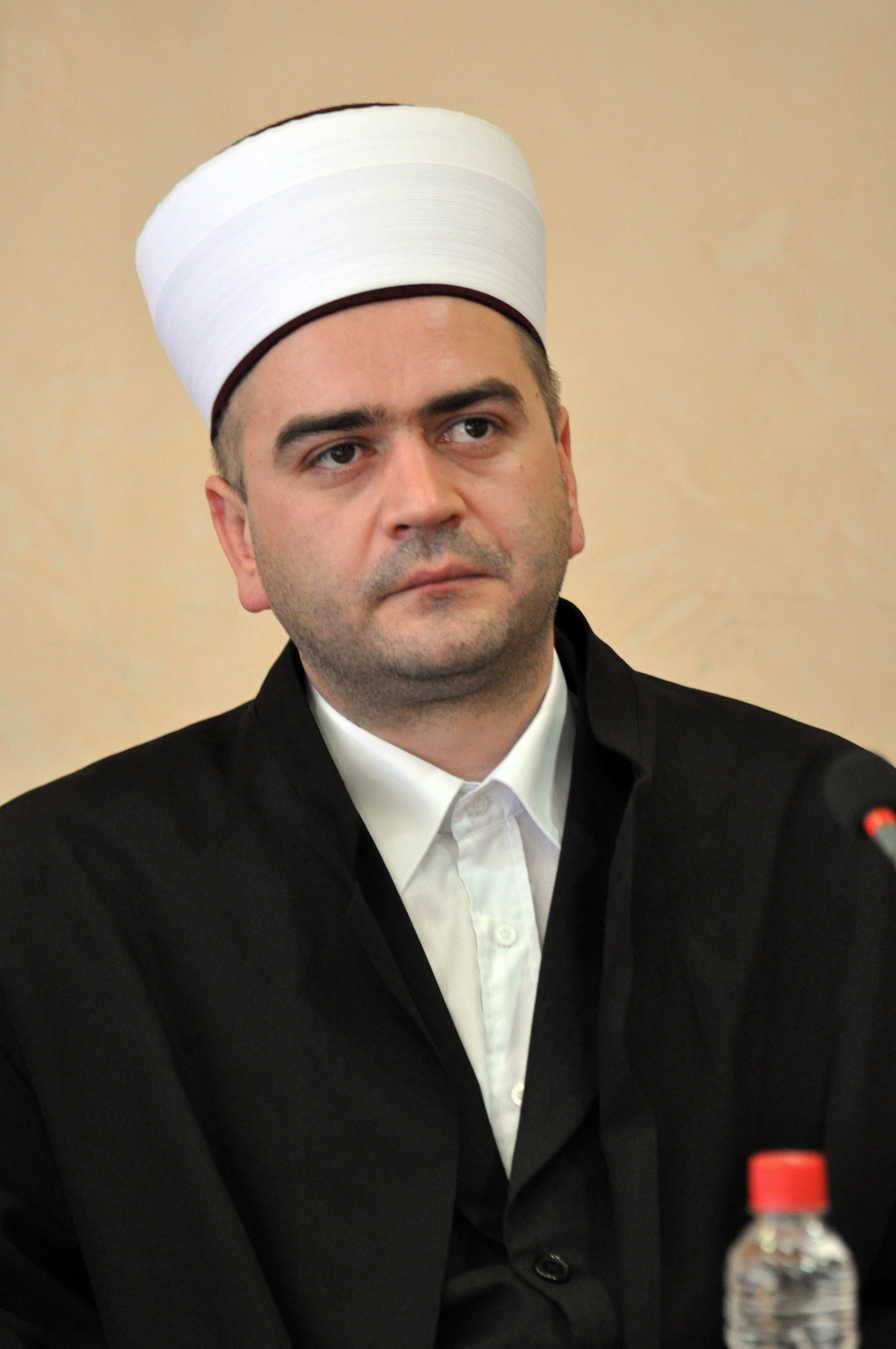
- Title: Reis-ul-ulema of Serbia

Personal life
- Born: 22 June 1979 (age 46) Bijelo Polje, SR Montenegro, SFR Yugoslavia
- Spouse: Suada Nasufović(Originally Ljajić)

Religious life
- Religion: Islam
- Denomination: Sunni
- School: Hanafi

Muslim leader
- Period in office: 2 July 2016 - Present
- Predecessor: Adem Zilkić

Sead Nasufović (Serbian Cyrillic: Сеад Насуфовић; born 22 June 1979) is a Bosniak Islamic cleric and since July 2016 the new Reis-ul-ulema of Serbia.

== Biography ==
He was born on 22 June 1979 in Bijelo Polje, today a part of Montenegro, to Bosniak parents. He finished middle school in his hometown, and graduated from the Madrasa "Gazi Isa-beg" Novi Pazar. He graduated from several faculties where he acquired the following titles: graduate Islamic theologian, graduate Islamic pedagogue, master of Islamic pedagogy, graduate philologist, master philologist. He is currently a doctoral student at the Faculty of Philology, University of Belgrade in the module for literature.

He was an imam in mosques in Bijelo Polje, Bar and Novi Pazar. He worked as a professor at the Madrasa "Sinan-beg" in Novi Pazar. He was the president of the Constitutional Court of the Islamic Community of Serbia.

== Reis-ul-ulema ==
In June 2016, at the session of the Supreme Assembly of the Islamic Community of Serbia held in Novi Pazar, the entire Riyaset of the Islamic Community of Serbia, headed by the Reis-ul-ulema, Adem Zilkić, was relieved of his duties, as well as the Mufti of Serbia, Muhamed Jusufspahić. Abdullah Numan was appointed the new Mufti of Serbia. The new Mufti of Sandžak (Hasib Suljović) and the new mufti of Preševo (Nedžmedin Sćipi) were also elected. Until the election of the new Reis-ul-ulema, it was decided that the Islamic Community of Serbia should be led by a commission composed of three muftis (Serbian, Sandžak and Preševo). Sead Nusufović was elected the new Reis-ul-ulema on 2 July 2016, and he was solemnly enthroned in the Bajrakli mosque in Belgrade. He should remain in that position until 2021.

== See also ==
- Islam in Serbia
