= Islam in Serbia =

Islam in Europe by percentage of country population 95–100%: Azerbaijan; 90–95%: Turkey; Kosovo; 50–70%: Albania; Bosnia and Herzegovina; Kazakhstan; 30–35%: North Macedonia; 10–20%: France; Sweden; Georgia; Montenegro; 5–10%: Austria; Belgium; Bulgaria; Denmark; Germany; Liechtenstein; Luxembourg; Netherlands; Russia; Switzerland; United Kingdom; Spain; Greece; 4–5%: Serbia; 2–4%: Italy; Finland; Norway; Malta; Slovenia; Cyprus (Note: Only takes into account the Muslim population residing on land controlled by the Republic of Cyprus.); 1–2%: Croatia; Ireland; Ukraine; Andorra; < 1%: Iceland; Armenia; Belarus; Czech Republic; Estonia; Hungary; Latvia; Lithuania; Moldova; Monaco; Poland; Portugal; Romania; San Marino; Slovakia

Islam in Serbia is a minority religion and the second largest religion in the country after Christianity. According to the 2022 census, there were 278,212 Muslims in Serbia, making up 4.2% of the population. The vast majority of Muslims in Serbia adhere to Sunni Islam.

== History ==
Islam began to spread rapidly following the Ottoman conquest of Serbia in the 15th century, gradually becoming the dominant religion in certain regions. Serbia's ethnically diverse Muslim community was largely formed through a long process of Islamization among the local Slavic population, and to a much lesser extent through the immigration of ethnic Turks from Anatolia. Among the most notable Muslim Serbs of that period were Mahmud Pasha Angelović (1420–1473) and Mehmed Pasha Sokolović (1505–1579), both of whom served as Grand viziers of the Ottoman Empire.

Islam was the official state religion of the Ottoman Empire, although the existence of other faiths was tolerated. Under the Ottoman system of religious autonomy, recognized religious communities were organized into independent entities known as millets, which retained their own religious laws, traditions, and languages under the protection of the sultan. Although Islam held a privileged position, Christian and Jewish subjects enjoyed a degree of legal, judicial, and cultural autonomy. Nevertheless, non-Muslims were subject to various forms of discrimination, including special taxes from which Muslims were exempt. Modern historiography generally agrees that the motives behind the conversion of Slavic population in the Ottoman Empire to Islam were primarily economic and socio-political in nature.

Muslims once constituted the majority population in Belgrade. According to the Ottoman traveler and writer Evliya Çelebi, when he visited Belgrade in 1660, Belgrade had approximately 108,000 inhabitants, of whom around 57,000 were Muslims. The largest was the Batal Mosque, located on the site of the present-day House of the National Assembly, which contemporary travel writers compared to Hagia Sophia.

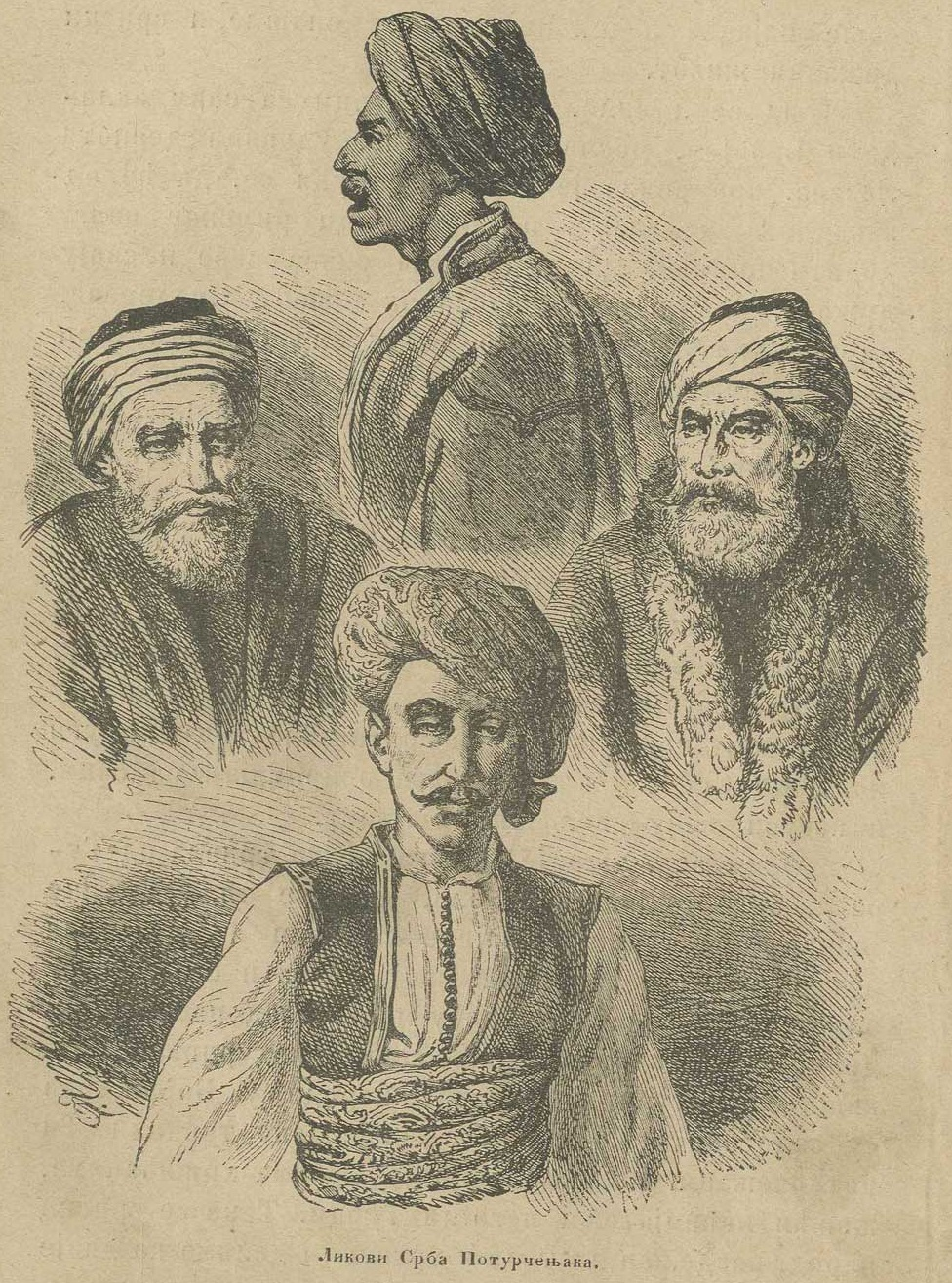
Sketches of Serb Muslims, early 19th century

During the successive stages of Serbia's liberation from Ottoman rule (1804–1867), the Muslim population steadily declined. During the First Serbian Uprising, many mosques in Belgrade were destroyed; in 1836, Serbian authorities compiled a register of Belgrade's mosques, listing sixteen surviving mosques in the city. Mosques were also demolished in other towns within the Principality of Serbia: in Užice 34 mosques were destroyed, while 24 were demolished in Smederevo. Following the withdrawal of the "Turkish" population from Belgrade in 1867, many of whom were actually Slavic Muslims, the final phase in the destruction of Belgrade's mosques began. As Felix Kanitz observed, "sometimes mines would accidentally explode at night, destroying mosques that obstructed urban regulation." Over time, all remaining mosques in Belgrade were demolished except for the Bajrakli Mosque. In 1862, an international conference of the Great Powers held in Kanlıca sanctioned the expulsion of Muslims from Serbia. Entire Muslim families were expelled from villages and towns incorporated into the Principality of Serbia. During this period, many Muslims fled as refugees to Bosnia Eyalet or to the Sanjak of Novi Pazar, which at the time remained outside Serbian control. Muslims from Valjevo, Šabac, and Užice migrated to Kostajnica in Bosnia, where the area in which they settled became known as "Užice." Many Muslims expelled from Serbia also settled in Zvornik in Bosnia as well. It is estimated that at by the end of the 1860s only about ten thousand Muslims remained in the Principality of Serbia.

Freedom of religion in the Principality of Serbia was formally recognized by the decree issued by Prince Mihailo Obrenović in 1868. In order to ensure that Muslims were "not left without religious comfort," the Belgrade Jamaat (Muslim religious community) was granted the use of the Bajrakli Mosque, which continues to serve as the only Muslim place of worship in Belgrade today.

At the 1878 Congress of Berlin, Serbia was recognized as an independent state and acquired new territories from the Ottoman Empire (present-day Nišava, Pirot, Toplica, and Pčinja districts), in which a large Muslim population resided. The Treaty of Berlin stipulated that "no person in Serbia shall be excluded or prevented from exercising civil or political rights or from holding public office on grounds of religious affiliation or denomination," and that "freedom and the public exercise of all forms of religious confession shall be guaranteed to all persons in Serbia, as well as to foreigners." Following the annexation of these territories, the Law on the Organization of the Liberated Areas affirmed the right of "Muslim citizens and citizens of any other religion recognized by law" to freely and equally perform "the religious rites of their faith."

The Islamic Community of Serbia was headed by the mufti, whose seat was in Niš. The Mufti of Niš was appointed by the Shaykh al-Islām in Istanbul, while the appointment was formally confirmed by the King of Serbia.

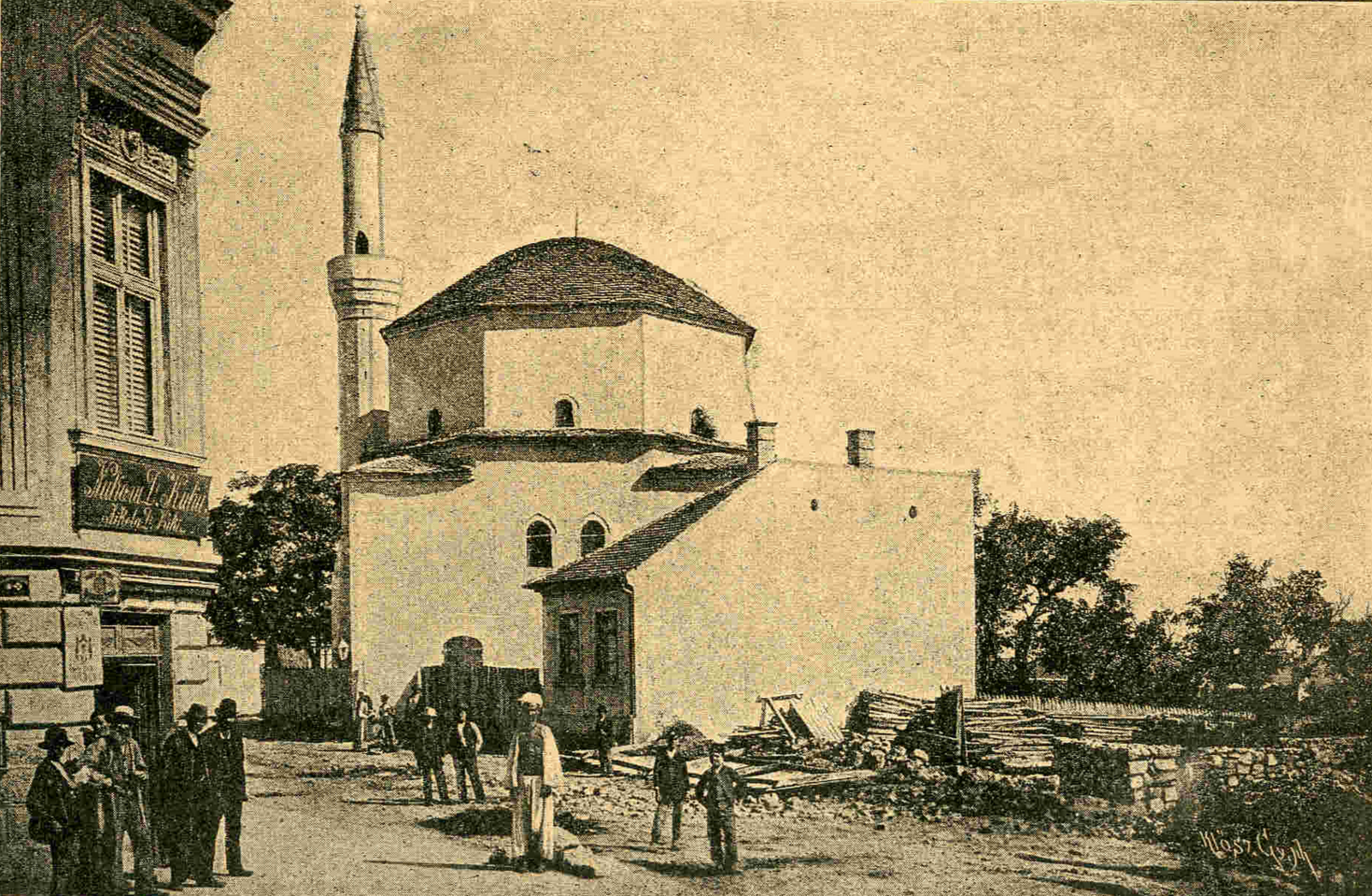
Bajrakli Mosque in Belgrade, 1892

Following the Balkan Wars and the annexation of Sandžak, Kosovo, and Macedonia, the number of Muslims in Serbia increased to approximately half a million, despite continued emigration to Turkey. The Mufti of Niš was subsequently proclaimed Grand Mufti of Serbia, while several regional muftis were also appointed. Their primary Sharia jurisdiction concerned matters of family and inheritance law.

With the establishment of the Kingdom of Serbs, Croats, and Slovenes in 1918, two separate Islamic religious communities continued to operate in parallel. One headed by a mufti based in Belgrade and with jurisdiction over Serbia, Montenegro, Kosovo, and Macedonia; the other governed by the reis-ul-ulema in Sarajevo encompassed Bosnia and Herzegovina, Croatia, and Slovenia.

The establishment of the Islamic Religious Community of the Kingdom of Yugoslavia was achieved through the Law on the Islamic Religious Community of 1930, whose fundamental provision stated: "All Muslims in the Kingdom of Yugoslavia constitute one autonomous Islamic religious community under the reis-ul-ulema as the supreme religious authority." The seat of the reis-ul-ulema was subsequently transferred to the capital, Belgrade. Nevertheless, divisions among Yugoslav Muslims persisted evident in the structure of the religious administration, as two majlises and two waqf councils were established, with seats in Sarajevo and Skopje.

In post-war Socialist Yugoslavia, the position of all religious communities, including the Islamic community, changed fundamentally. Through the Constitution of the Federal People’s Republic of Yugoslavia (1946) and the Law on the Legal Status of Religious Communities (1953), the Yugoslav state defined the basic principles governing its relationship with religious communities. These principles included the separation of church and state, freedom of religion and conscience, equality of all religious communities, and the separation of church and school, while permitting the free organization of religious education within religious institutions.

Compared to the Interwar period, during which the Islamic religious community did not enjoy equal status with the Serbian Orthodox Church and the Catholic Church, the secularization policies of socialist Yugoslavia and the formal proclamation of religious equality placed Muslims in an equal legal position. Within socialist Yugoslavia, the Islamic Community of Serbia operated as part of the central Islamic Community of Yugoslavia. During this period, institutions and waqfs were gradually restored, including the reestablishment of the Belgrade muftiate with jurisdiction over most of Serbia. Following the breakup of Yugoslavia, the Islamic Community of Serbia was formally reconstituted in 1994 as an independent community.

The division of the Islamic community in Serbia emerged in 2007, when disagreements over leadership, jurisdiction, and relations with the Islamic Community in Bosnia and Herzegovina led to the formation of two rival organizations. One faction, based in Belgrade, claimed continuity with the Islamic Community of Serbia and advocated keeping an independent Islamic organization within Serbia. The other faction, the Islamic Community in Serbia, headquartered in Novi Pazar, recognized the authority of the reis-ul-ulema in Sarajevo and was institutionally tied to the Islamic Community of Bosnia and Herzegovina.

== Demographics ==
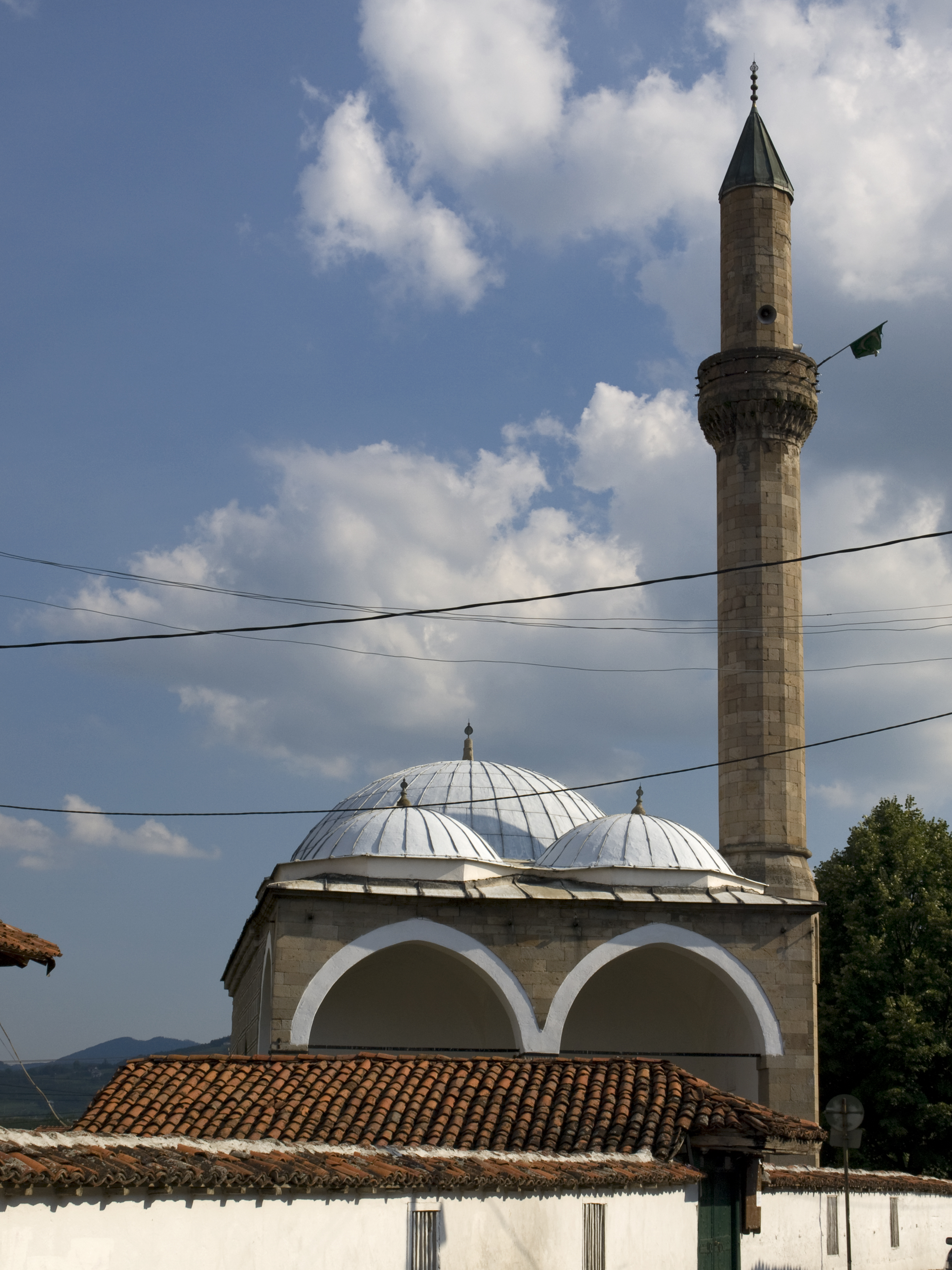
Altun-Alem Mosque in Novi Pazar

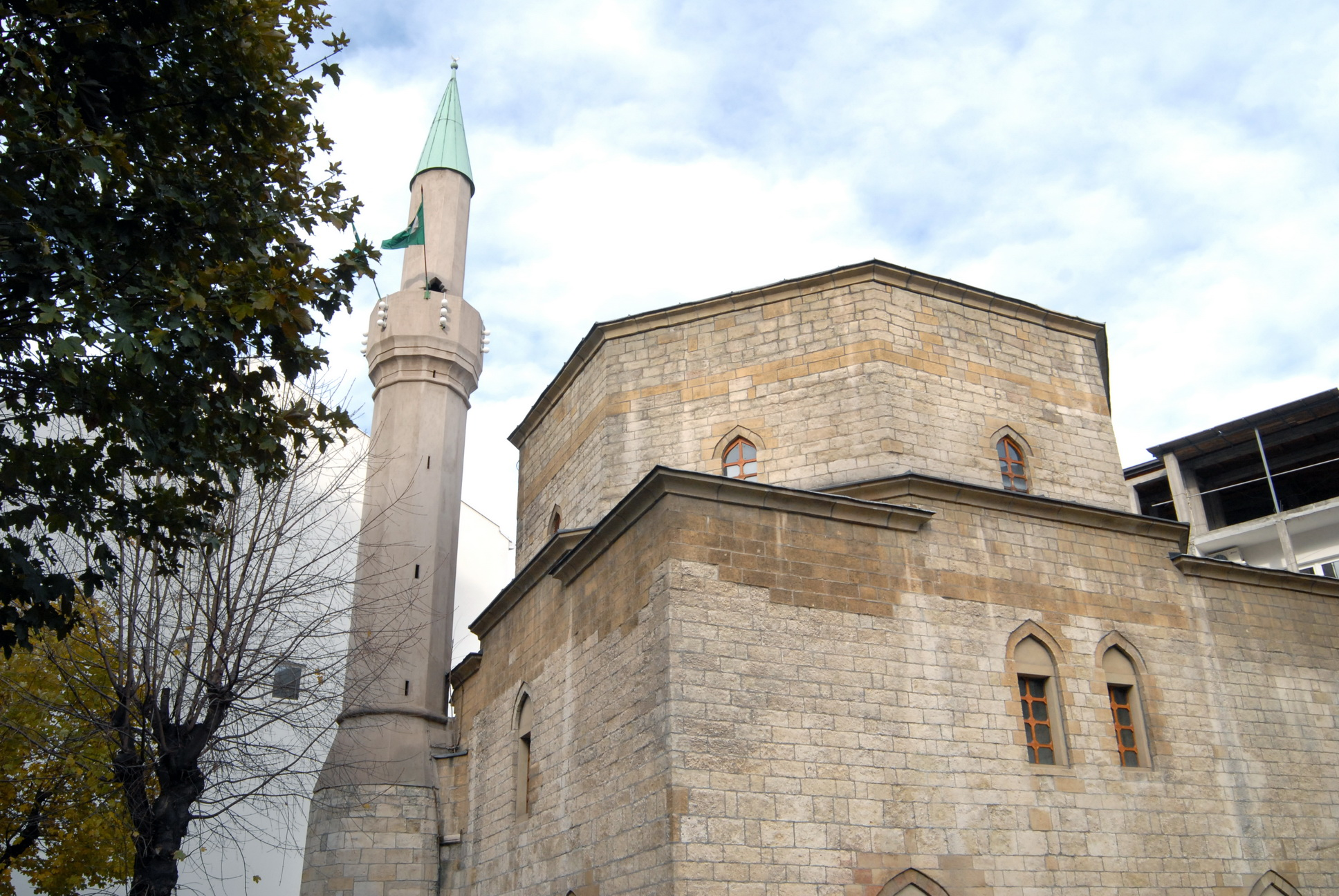
Bajrakli Mosque in Belgrade

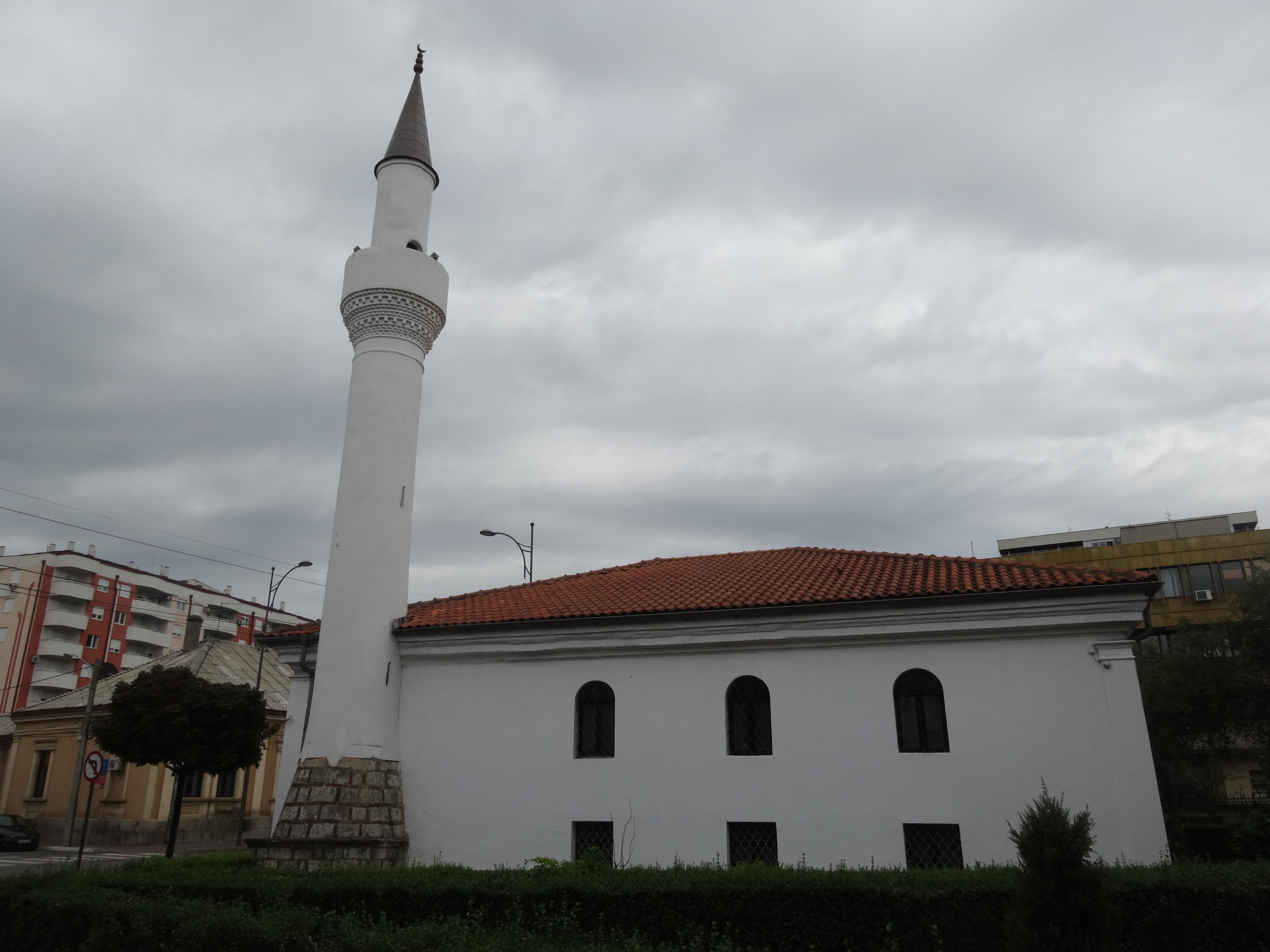
Islam-aga Mosque in Niš

Faculty for Islamic studies in Novi Pazar

Islam in Serbia has a strong following among ethnic Bosniaks and Albanians; in addition, a quarter of the country's Roma population are Muslim. The published data from the 2022 Census included a crosstab of ethnicity and religion, which showed that adherents of Islam were divided between the following ethnic groups:

- 153,197 Bosniaks (55%)
- 60,253 Albanians (21.6%)
- 32,973 Roma (11.8%)
- 12,179 ethnic Muslims (4.3%)
- 7,287 Gorani (2.6%)
- 4,238 Serbs (Serb Muslims) (1.5%)
- 8,085 others, undeclared or unknown (2.9%)

The largest concentrations of Muslims in Serbia are to be found in the Sandžak region (municipalities of Novi Pazar, Tutin, Sjenica, and Prijepolje) and in the Preševo Valley (municipalities of Preševo and Bujanovac).

City / municipality	Muslims	Share
Novi Pazar	88,493	82.9%
Preševo	31,505	94.2%
Tutin	30,909	93.5%
Bujanovac	28,254	68.8%
Belgrade	28,210	1.7%
Sjenica	18,860	78.3%
Prijepolje	15,066	46.8%
Priboj	5,119	21.8%
Novi Sad	4,870	1.3%
Požarevac	3,245	4.7%
Subotica	3,238	2.6%
Niš	2,224	0.9%
Smederevo	1,773	1.8%
Zrenjanin	1,346	1.3%
Beočin	1,156	8.3%
Nova Varoš	1,069	7.9%
Bor	1,052	2.6%

== Structure ==
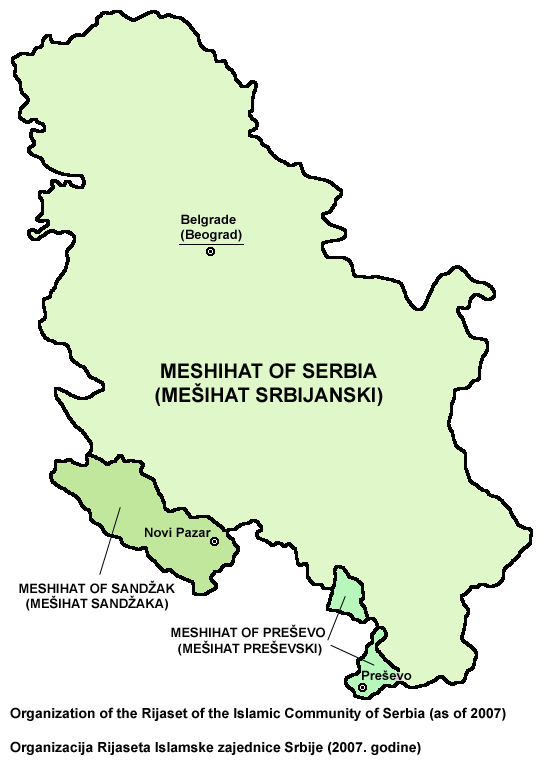
Meshihats of the Islamic Community of Serbia

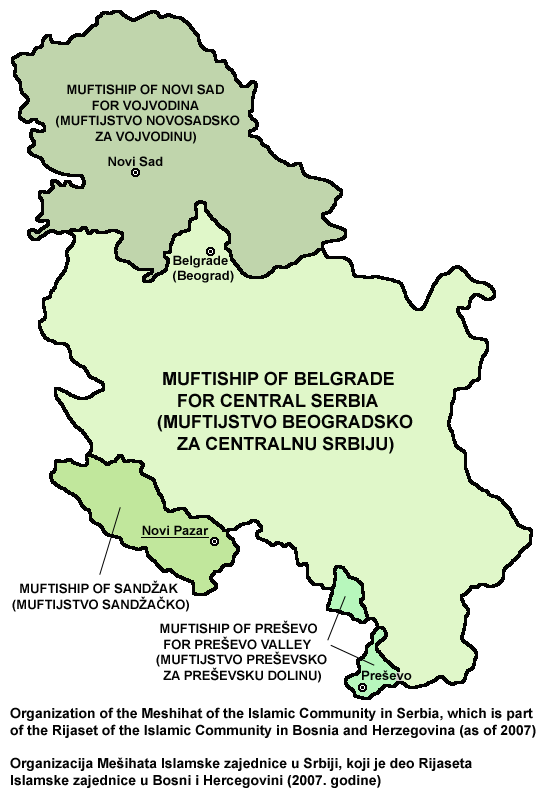
Muftiates of the Islamic Community in Serbia

Adherents of Islam in Serbia are organized into two separate organizations: the Islamic Community of Serbia and the Islamic Community in Serbia, a branch of the Islamic Community of Bosnia and Herzegovina.

The Islamic Community of Serbia (Islamska zajednica Srbije), with its seat in Belgrade, is founded in 1868 and traces its origins to the Principality of Serbia. It is governed by riyasat (headed by reis-ul-ulema) and organized into three meshihats (mešihati): Sandžak (for Sandžak), Preševo (for Preševo Valley), and Serbia (for the rest of the country).

The Islamic Community in Serbia (Islamska zajednica u Srbiji), with its seat in Novi Pazar, is founded in 2007 and is a branch of the Islamic Community of Bosnia and Herzegovina. It is administered by mufti and organized into four regional muftiates (muftijstva): Sandžak (for Sandžak), Preševo (for Preševo Valley), Belgrade (for Central Serbia), and Novi Sad (for Vojvodina).

== See also ==
- Religion in Serbia
- Islam in Europe
