= Islamic Religious Community of the Kingdom of Yugoslavia =

Islamic Religious Community of the Kingdom of Yugoslavia (Serbo-Croatian: Islamska vjerska zajednica Kraljevine Jugoslavije) was an organisation of Muslims in the Kingdom of Yugoslavia established in 1930.

The Islamic Religious Community of the Kingdom of Yugoslavia was established on 31 March 1930, with the enactment of the Act on the Islamic Religious Community. The new law ended the previously existing Islamic Community established under the Austrian-Hungarian Statute for the Autonomous Administration of the Islamic Religious and Waqf-Mearif Affairs from 1909. According to the new law, the seat of the reis-ul-ulema, the head of the Islamic Community was placed in Belgrade. The King had the power to appoint the reis-ul-ulema and the members of the majlises in Sarajevo and Skopje and nine muftis. The waqf-mearif affairs were put under the direct control of the Ministry of Justice. On 5 February 1930, Alexander I of Yugoslavia enacted the Regulation on Temporary Organisation of Governance and Affairs of the Islamic Religious Community of the Kingdom of Yugoslavia, which gave the Ministry of Justice the right to control the affairs of the Islamic Community.

The existing reis-il-ulema opposed the changes before the law was enacted, and insisted that religious and waqf officials should be elected and not appointed by the King who would appoint people close to the government. He even asked for his dismissal if such a law would be enacted. Alexander I ignored Čaušević's opposition to the changes, and on 26 February 1930, he appointed him reis-ul-ulema of the Islamic Community. Čaušević remained consistent and refused to take the office until his conditions were met. Realising that none of his requests would be met, on 11 April 1930 Čaušević asked for his dismissal even if he would be left without the state pension. On the proposal of the Ministry of Justice, Alexander I signed his dismissal on 6 June 1930.

Čaušević's successor was appointed on 12 June 1930, when Alexander I appointed the mufti of Banja Luka Ibrahim Maglajlić the new reis-ul-ulema. Maglajlić was installed to the office on 31 October 1930 in Belgrade's Bajrakli Mosque. Maglajlić was a supporter of Alexander's dictatorship and was previously a member of the ruling People's Radical Party. On 9 October 1930, Alexander enacted the new Constitution of the Islamic Community which enhanced the state control over the community and enabled the state appointment of the waqf officials.

== Leaders ==
=== Reis-ul-ulema ===
- 1930–1936 Ibrahim Maglajlić (1861–1936), seat in Belgrade
  - 1936–1938 Salih Safvet Bašić (1886–1948), acting
- 1938–1942 Fehim Spaho (1877–1942)
  - 1942–1947 Salih Safvet Bašić (1886–1948), acting
