= Muhtasibat =

A muhtasibat is an Islamic territorial division overseen by a muhtasib and is directly subordinate to a qadi and qadiyat.

As Sunni Islam does not prescribe any formal hierarchy or priesthood, muhtasibats are primarily found in Eastern European and Central Asian Islamic organizations, particularly in countries part of the former Soviet Union.

Originally, a muhtasib was an Ottoman official charged with supervising proper weights and measures in markets as well as the proper conduct of certain rituals. Today, a muhtasibat is a territory containing several mahallahs or congregations. Religious institutions and Islamic parochial schools fall directly under the supervision of muhtasibats.

== See also ==
- Mufti
- Muftiate
- Qadi
- Qadiyat
- Mahallah
