= Islam-aga Mosque =

Mosque in Niš, Serbia

- Ислам-агина џамија Islam-agina džamija
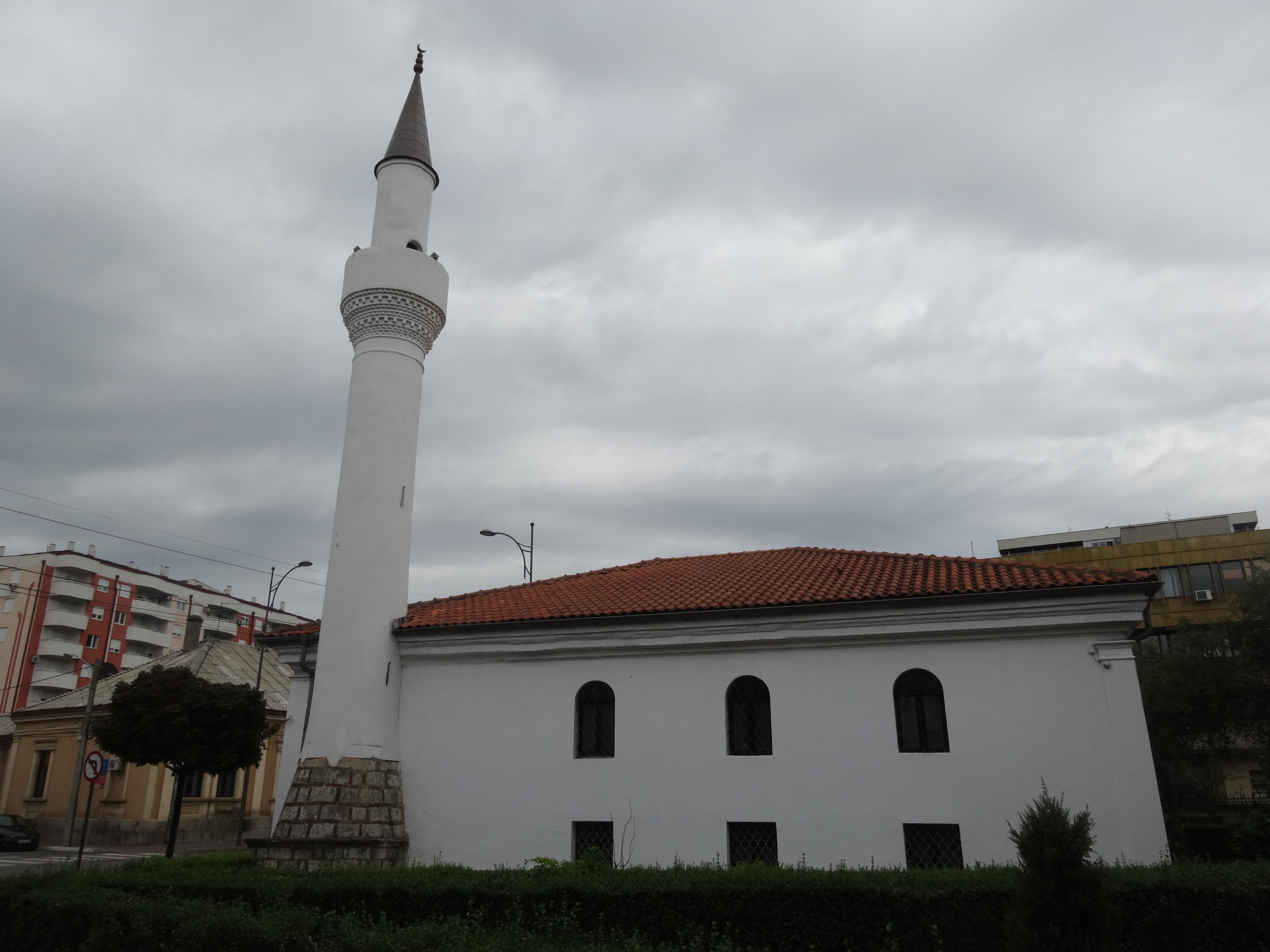

Religion
- Affiliation: Islam
- Ecclesiastical or organisational status: Mosque

Location
- Location: Niš, Serbia
- State: Serbia
- Interactive map of Islam-aga Mosque
- Coordinates: 43.320456°N 21.893153°E

Architecture
- Type: Islamic Mosque
- Completed: 1720

Islam-aga Mosque (Serbian: Ислам-агина џамија, romanized: Islam-agina džamija) is the only functioningmosque in Niš, Serbia. There is another mosque in Niš Fortress which has been converted into a gallery, and another close to the University Rectorate that was damaged during the Anglo-American bombing of the city in 1944.

It was built in 1720 and reconstructed in 1870. Of the twenty mosques in Niš during Ottoman rule, it is the only one that remains in use. It was torched in an arson attack in 2004, and reconstructed in 2013.

== See also ==
- Islam in Serbia
- Islamic architecture
- List of mosques
