= Qadiyat =

Qadiyat قضية
- Village
- Country: Yemen
- Governorate: Al Hudaydah
- District: Ad Durayhimi district
- Time zone: UTC+3 (EAT)

Qadiyat or Qaziyat (alternative spellings: Kadiyat or Kaziyat) (Russian: Кадиат) in Islam is a territorial division associated with a qadi; in some cases subordinate to the mufti and muftiate. In analogy to Christianity, a qadiyat would be considered a diocese.

As Sunni Islam does not prescribe any formal hierarchy or priesthood, qadiyats are primarily found in European- and Central Asian Islamic organizations, particularly in south-eastern Europe and countries deriving from the former Soviet Union.

In Russia and in other parts of the former Soviet Union, a muhtasibat is directly subordinate to a qadiyat.

The Ottoman Empire had a similar territorial division called a kadiluk, which was more concerned with justice and taxation than religion.

== See also ==
- Qadi
- Mufti
- Muftiate
- Muhtasibat
- Mahallah
