= Ružica Sokić =

Serbian actress and writer

- Ружица Сокић
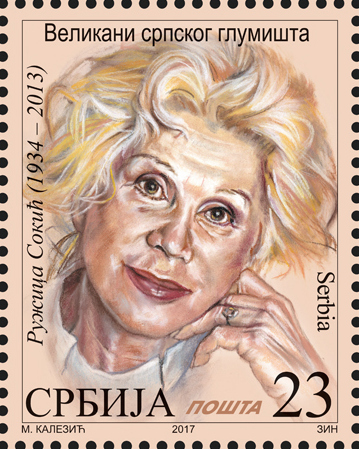
- Born: Ružica Sokić; 14 December 1934; Belgrade, Kingdom of Yugoslavia
- Died: 19 December 2013 (aged 79); Belgrade, Serbia
- Other name: Ruža Soda
- Education: University of Arts in Belgrade
- Occupations: Actress, writer
- Years active: 1957–2011

Ružica Sokić (Serbian Cyrillic: Ружица Сокић; 14 December 1934 – 19 December 2013) was a Serbian actress and writer.

== Biography ==
She was born in Belgrade, then Kingdom of Yugoslavia.

Sokić began her acting career in 1957 and was credited in over 40 films and television shows. Her last acting credit was in 2011. In October 2010, she published the book The passion for flying.

Her sister is the Yugoslav Painter Ljubica Sokić, and her nephew is Abdullah Numan, the Mufti of Serbia.

Ružica Sokić was diagnosed with Alzheimer's disease and died from the illness on 19 December 2013, aged 79, in her hometown of Belgrade, Serbia.

== Selected filmography ==
- Subotom uvece (1957) - Navijacica (segment "Doktor") (uncredited)
- Zvizduk u osam (1962) - Sekretarica u TV ekipi (uncredited)
- Zemljaci (1963) - Cvijeta
- March on the Drina (1964) - Zena na prozoru
- Gorki deo reke (1965) - Jelena
- Vreme ljubavi (1966) - (segment "Put")
- Sticenik (1966) - Bozica (voice, uncredited)
- Bokseri idu u raj (1967) - Svastika
- Dim (1967)
- Love Affair, or the Case of the Missing Switchboard Operator (1967) - Ruza, Izabelina koleginica
- Kad budem mrtav i beo (1967) - Duska ... pevacica
- Ima ljubavi, nema ljubavi (1968)
- Sedmina (1969) - Ana
- Cross Country (1969) - Sestra
- Ljubav i poneka psovka (1969) - Elma
- Traces of a Black Haired Girl (1972) - Kaca
- Zuta (1973) - Zuta
- Guns of War (1974) - Mira
- Hitler iz naseg sokaka (1975) - Anika
- Poznajete li Pavla Plesa? (1975) - Milena
- Cuvar plaze u zimskom periodu (1976) - Udovica
- Hajducka vremena (1977) - Brankova uciteljica
- Leptirov oblak (1977) - Jela
- Nije nego (1978) - Profesorka geografije
- Pakleni otok (1979)
- Avanture Borivoja Surdilovica (1980) - Andjelija
- Savamala (1982) - Koletova majka
- Tesna koza (1982) - Persida Pantic
- Ja sam tvoj Bog (1983)
- Vojnici (1984) - Gradjanka
- Ada (1985) - Doktorica Sefer
- Dancing in Water (1985) - Kica's mother
- Druga Zikina dinastija (1986) - Vlajkova snajka Ruza
- Majstor i Sampita (1986) - Bertina drugarica I
- Oktoberfest (1987) - Luletova majka
- Tesna koza 2 (1987) - Persida Pantic
- Vec vidjeno (1987) - Glumica
- Sta radis veceras (1988) - Milja (segment "Kravata obavezna")
- Tesna koza 3 (1988) - Persida Pantic
- Jednog lepog dana (1988) - Ana
- Seobe (1989)
- Tesna koza 4 (1991) - Persida Pantic
- Original falsifikata (1991) - Mileva
- Bracna putovanja (1991) - Johanova zena
- Tango argentino (1992) - Rodjaka
- Pun mesec nad Beogradom (1993) - Kosara
- Tamna je noc (1995) - Ruzica Belezada
- Proputovanje (1999) - Komsinica Vera (segment "Srebrni metak")
- Normalni ljudi (2001) - Nikolina ujna
- Sve je za ljude (2001) - Sudija
- Zona Zamfirova (2001) - Taska
- Zvezde ljubavi (2005) - Glumica
- Otvoreni kavez (2015) - Ruza (final film role)
