= Sreten Sokić =

Serbian businessman and academic

Sreten Sokić (born August 20, 1945, in Sevojno) is a Serbian political scientist, economist, businessman and retired University Professor. Sokić was at the time Vice-Rector of the University of Belgrade, Vice-Rector at the Faculty of Political Science, full professor at the Faculty of Political Science in Belgrade. Sokić was the director of the Institute for Political Studies and the managing director of the Copper and Aluminum Rolling Mill in Sevojno.

He is the author of fifty scientific and professional books and monographs, nine student books, over fifty independent scientific papers, about thirty independent scientific and professional papers which are integral parts in monographic publications, over 40 determinants in economic lexicons, as well as numerous published scientific exhibitions in scientific conferences.

Sokić is the author of eighteen macro-research projects, of which seven have been managed by him. Areas of Scientific Research: Theoretical Foundations of the Science of Economics; Economic policy and economic system; Contemporary tendencies of globalization; Transition of Economic Systems and Economic History of Serbia.

He has received certificates and awards, including the Gold Wreath Order.

== Biography ==
Sreten (Radoš) Sokić was born in Sevojno on August 20, 1945. He graduated from the Faculty of Political Science in Belgrade in 1970. He received his master's degree from the Faculty of History and Economics, Tallahassee, Florida, USA in 1973, as well as from the Faculty of Political Science in Belgrade in 1974. Sokić received his doctorate from the Faculty of Political Science, Belgrade in 1976.

Among other things, he was an assistant professor at the Institute for Political Studies (1970–1974), Head of the IPO Sector (1980–1981), deputy director (1981–1984) and Director (1984–1987).

Sokić has been an assistant professor at the Faculty of Political Science (since 1974), an assistant professor (since 1977), a dean for teaching (1981–1983), an associate professor (1982), and a full professor (since 1987).

As a full professor at the Faculty of Political Science, University of Belgrade, Sokić has led the following courses: Economics, Serbian Economic System, Theory and Practice of Public Finance, Emergency Economics and Theory and Practice of Transition (PhD). He was the head of the direction of the postgraduate (master's) studies at the Faculty of Political Science: Transformation of the Economic System and Economic Policy of Yugoslavia (course realized from 1993 to 1997); Transition from administrative-centralist to market economy (1993–1997); Transition of economic systems (since 1997). Within these directions, Sokić taught classes in the following areas: Socioeconomic Organization of Yugoslavia; Property and transition; Economics of Transition; Transition theory and practice. Sokić participated in the realization of teaching at the university multidisciplinary studies, taught courses of Rehabilitation and Sociotherapy, in the academic years 2003 and 2004.

In specialist and postgraduate studies, as well as in the preparation of doctoral dissertations, Sokić was more than twenty times mentor, chairman of committees and member of defense committees.

Head of Postgraduate Studies at the Faculty of Political Science in Belgrade.

Sokić was also the General Director of the Copper and Aluminum Rolling Mill in Sevojno (1990–1991) and Vice-Rector of the University of Belgrade from October 4, 2000, to March 26, 2001.

He was the editor of a series of editions and editorial boards. A member of the editorial board of journals for philosophy, social sciences and political criticism “Serbian freely thought” (serb. Српска слободарска мисао) since 2000.

Held hundreds of public lectures at homeland and abroad.

The Chair of Political Economy and Economic Sciences and the Teaching and Scientific Council of the Faculty of Political Science assessed that prof. S. Sokić delivered high-level results.

== Books (selection) ==
- Ekonomija i revolucionisanje proizvodnih snaga, Institut za političke studije, Beograd, 1977. Pp. 400.
- Materijalne snage i ekonomski oblici samoupravljanja, Institut za političke studije, Beograd, 1987. Pp. 852. YU. ISBN 86-7419-001-2 OCLC 19559449 LCCN 88-189014
- Ekonomski poredak, Naučna knjiga, Beograd, 1992. Koautor: prof. Ljubisav Marković. Pp. 398, ISBN 86-23-04101-1
- Ekonomija, Zavod za udžbenike i nastavna sredstva, Beograd, 1996. Koautor: prof. Ljubisav Marković. Pp. 614. ISBN 978-86-17-04914-8.
- Tranzicija – iluzija ili budućnost, Zavet, Beograd, 2000. Pp. 389. ISBN 978-86-7034-035-0
- Ekonomija tranzicije, „Zavet", Beograd, 2003. Pp. 678. ISBN 978-86-7034-055-8
- Kapital u ekonomiji tranzicije, „Zavet", Beograd, 2005. Pp. 840. ISBN 86-7034-065-8.
- Srbija u procesima kapitala, „Zavet", Beograd, 2008. Pp. 634. ISBN 978-86-7034-068-8.
- Ekonomija javne potrošnje, „Čigoja štampa" i Fakultet političkih nauka, Beograd, 2011. god. ISBN 978-86-7558-792-7. Pp. 378
