= Ljubica Sokić =

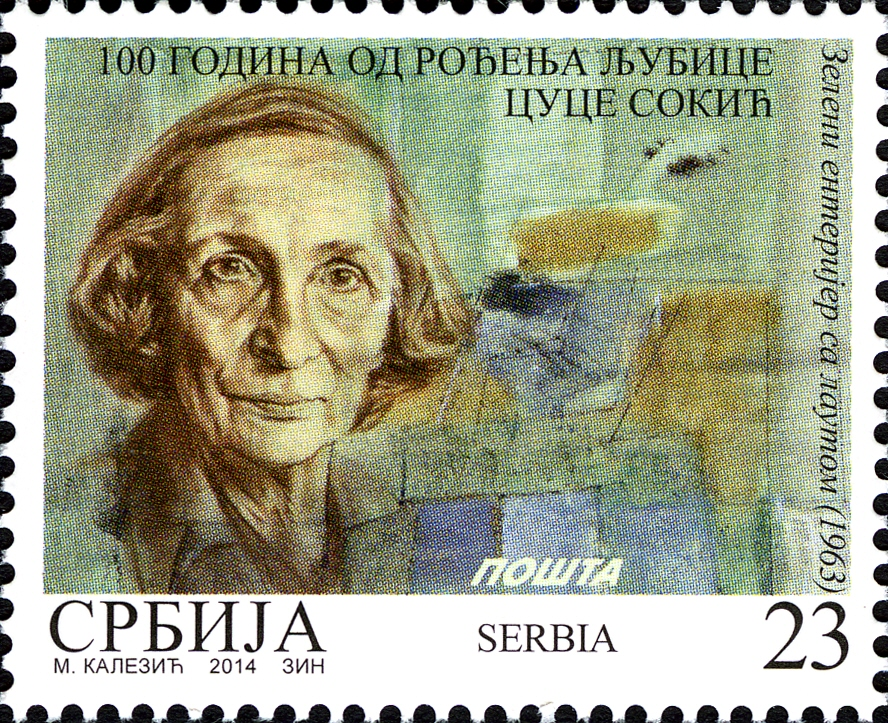
Ljubica Sokić on a 2014 Serbian stamp

Ljubica "Cuca" Sokić (9 December 1914 – 8 January 2009) was a prominent Serbian and Yugoslav painter of the twentieth century.

== Biography ==
She was born in Bitola, North Macedonia, where her mother Ruža was refugee during the World War I. Her father was Manojlo Sokić, a journalist, who owned defunct Belgrade paper Pravda. She attended the high school in Belgrade, where Zora Petrović was her professor. She was also taught painting by, among others, Beta Vukanović and Ivan Radović. She also studied in Paris from 1936 to 1939, where she attended evening nude classes at the Académie de la Grande Chaumière, and began studying graphics at the Ecole des Beaux-Arts. Having returned from Paris to Belgrade, she presented her works independently for the first time in 1939 in Belgrade pavilion Cvijeta Zuzorić.

She was one of the founders of the art group "Desetorica" ("The Group of Ten"). She was a professor at the Academy of Visual Arts in Belgrade between 1948–72, where she taught watercolour and painting. In 1968 she became a corresponding member of the Serbian Academy of Sciences and Arts, and from 1978 regular member of the academy. Besides painting, already during her studies, she drew children's comics for her father's paper Pravda, and after the World War II she illustrated Poletarac, Zmaj, Pionir, Pionirske novine. She has created illustrations for more than thirty children's books. She also worked in cinematography.

Her paintings are described as intimistic. At first she painted still life, landscapes, figures and portraits. Later she was moving towards simplifying forms, geometry and moderate abstraction. At times she used collage and experimental materials techniques.

She received more than twenty various awards and recognitions for her artistic opus.

Her sister is the famous Serbian actress and writer Ružica Sokić, and her nephew is Abdullah Numan, the Mufti of Serbia.

She died on 8 January 2009, aged 94, in Belgrade. She was interred five days later at Novo Groblje cemetery.
