= Muftiate =

Administrative territorial entity under the supervision of a mufti

A muftiate (Note: Alternative spelling: muftiyat; Bosnian: Muftijstvo or Muftiluk; Albanian: Myftini; Bulgarian: мюфтийство; Kazakh: мүфтият; Russian: Муфтият; Tatar: мөфтият; Bashkir: мөфтиәт; Romanian: muftiat; Ukrainian: Муфтіят) is an administrative territorial entity, mainly in the post-Soviet and Southeastern European states, under the supervision of a mufti. In the post-Yugoslavia states, spiritual administrations similar to the muftiate are called riyasat.

A grand muftiate is more significant than a muftiate, and is presided over by a grand mufti.

A grand muftiate or muftiate is responsible for the day-to-day operations of the directorate, and oversees the local boards, clerics, mosques, and trusteeships. The structure of Russian and Southeastern European muftiates were never prescribed by Islamic doctrine, but instead are based on the principle of an all-encompassing legal and administrative order in parallel fashion to Christian dioceses with the purpose of regulating the Islamic religion.

== History ==
In 1788, the Russian Empire under Empress Catherine II established the first muftiate in Russia, named “The Orenburg Muslim Spiritual Assembly”, governed by a supreme mufti who oversaw the appointment of imams and the management of mosques across the empire. The mufti was initially appointed by the emperor, but with a decree signed by Emperor Alexander I in 1817, it was determined that the mufti should be elected by the Muslim community with imperial approval. Most of the muftis, their assistants, and ordinary mullahs were elected from the Kazan Tatars. The mufti's duties included overseeing the Muslim clergy, clerical appointments, the construction of mosques, marriages and divorces, inheritances, property disputes, endowments (waqf), cases of disobedience to parents by children, the correctness of the execution of Muslim worship, and birth registrations. With the creation of the Soviet Union, the Orenburg Muslim Spiritual Assembly was replaced by the Central Spiritual Board of Muslims.

After 1944, the management of spiritual affairs of the Muslim population in Russia was carried out by four independent spiritual boards: The Spiritual Administration of the Muslims of Central Asia and Kazakhstan (Tashkent), The Spiritual Administration of Muslims of the Caucasus (Baku), the Spiritual Administration of Muslims of the Northern Caucasus (Buynaksk), and the Spiritual Administration of Muslims of the European Part of the USSR and Siberia (Ufa). The breakup of the four spiritual boards came with the fall of the Soviet Union in 1991. Today, each of the former Soviet Republics with significant Muslim populations have their own independent Spiritual Boards. Attempts have been made to unite all the Islamic religious organizations in Russia into one single umbrella organization without success.

In the 19th century, the Austrian Habsburgs and Russians expanded into southeastern Europe, carving territory out of the Ottoman Empire and helping establish newly independent countries. The Muslim population in these countries was organized under muftiates in a similar fashion to those in Russia. Today, the majority of muftiates in southeastern Europe are independent from government control.

== Countries ==
=== Former Soviet Union ===
Former republics of the Soviet Union that retained muftiates or "spiritual boards" after the breakup of the USSR: Azerbaijan, Georgia, Kazakhstan, Kyrgyzstan, Lithuania, Russia, Tajikistan, Ukraine, and Uzbekistan.

Four spiritual directorates presided over the territory of the Soviet Union until the dissolution of the USSR in 1991. The newly independent countries established their own independent muftiates or "spiritual administrations" based on the remnants of the Soviet system, such the Central Spiritual Administration of the Muslims of Russia, the Clerical Board of Ukraine's Muslims, the Religious Council of the Caucasus, the Spiritual Administration of the Muslims of Kazakhstan, and others.

=== Southeastern Europe ===
Countries in southeastern Europe who inherited large Muslim populations after gaining their independence from the Ottoman Empire between the 17th and 19th centuries include: Albania, Bosnia-and-Herzegovina, Bulgaria, Croatia, Greece, Kosovo, Macedonia, Montenegro, Romania, Serbia and Slovenia.

Many of these muftiates or riyasats were established by these countries following their independence from the Ottoman Empire.

== Structure and organization ==
At the top of the structure of a grand muftiate is a grand mufti and his council, followed by muftis and their councils. Independent muftiates are governed by a mufti and a council. In Russia (as was during the Soviet Union) a muftiate is further divided into qadiyats which are led by qadis. Directly subordinate to qadiyats are muhtasibats which are headed by a muhtasib (originally an Ottoman official charged with supervising proper weights and measures in markets and the proper conduct of certain rituals). In some muftiates the qadis rank below a muhtasib. Each mahalla or congregation is managed by an elected body called a mutavalliat composed of members of the congregation.

The level of governance differs from country to country and even from muftiate to muftiate. In some countries muftis are elected by adherents while in others they are appointed to the post by the council of muftis or appointed by the government.

== See also ==
- List of Islamic Muftiates
- Grand Mufti
- Mufti
- Qadiyat
- Muhtasibat
- Mahallah
- Riyasat (Islam)
