= Riyasat (Islam) =

Muslim executive body in the post-Yugoslavia states

Riyasat (Serbo-Croatian: rijaset, ријасет; Bulgarian: старшинство) is a main executive body of the Islamic communities in the Balkan region. The head of a riyasat is the reis-ul-ulema, equivalent to the grand mufti of a grand muftiate.

== History ==
During the Ottoman Empire, all Muslims were subjected to the shaykh al-Islam, the supreme religious authority, even though the sultan maintained the title of caliph. After Austrian-Hungarian occupation of Bosnia and Herzegovina in 1878, general Josip Filipović, who led the occupation, received instructions that Bosnian Muslims should become independent from the shaykh al-Islām in Istanbul. The Austrian-Hungarian authorities had in plan to make this separation look like a local initiative.

After Filipović failed to do so, Gyula Andrássy, at the time foreign minister of Austria-Hungary, tried to do the same through joint Austro-Hungarian Ministry of Finance, which was responsible for Bosnia and Herzegovina, headed by Béni Kállay, and governor of Bosnia and Herzegovina, Josip Filipović. Andrássy saw this as a political instrument to strengthen the position of the Austro-Hungarian authorities in newly occupied Bosnia and Herzegovina.

Bosnian Muslims fiercely opposed to this move of the Austrian-Hungarian authorities. The conflict reached its peak when the Ottoman Sublime Porte named Ahmed Şükrü, a former Rumelian kazasker, a new Bosnian-Herzegovinian mufti on 18 June 1880. They based their decision on the Novi Pazar Convention of 1879 between Austria-Hungary and the Ottoman Empire, in which, among other things, Austria-Hungary committed to respect Bosnian Muslims' religious freedoms, while Bosnian Muslims received the right to maintain religions connections with shaykh al-Islām in Istanbul.

Bosnian Muslims opposed any separation from Istanbul. Austria-Hungary agreed that shaykh al-Islām could appoint religious officials in Bosnia and Herzegovina, but only from the local population. They asked from the Austrian-Hungarian ambassador in Istanbul to prevent Şükrü from taking the office of Bosnian-Herzegovinian Mufti. The Austrian-Hungarian authorities saw Husein Nur Hafizović as chief representative of Muslims in Bosnia and Herzegovina who was at the time supreme sharia judge in Bosnia and Herzegovina.

In the end, Austrian-Hungarian authorities succeeded in preventing Şükrü from taking the office of mufti and shaykh al-Islām Uryanizade Ahmed Esad named Mustafa Hilmi Hadžiomerović a new Bosnian-Herzegovinian mufti. Hadžiomerović was known as suitable person for the Austro-Hungarian authorities. Immediately after the Austrian-Hungarian forces occupied Bosnia and Herzegovina, he called for Bosnian Muslims to accept military laws of the Austrian-Hungarian occupational administration. On 17 October 1882, emperor Franz Joseph issued an imperial decree in which he proclaimed Hadžiomerović a reis-ul-ulema of Bosnia and Herzegovina. This made Muslims in Bosnia and Herzegovina independent from the Ottoman religious authority, and nobody from the Ottoman Empire opposed this decision of the Austrian-Hungarian emperor.

After Hadžiomerović was named reis-ul-ulema, the institution of the riyasat, as main executive body of the Islamic community in Bosnia and Herzegovina, was established. It was a unique institution in all of the Islamic world. Béni Kállay's efforts of creating an independent Islamic community in Bosnia and Herzegovina were finally realised. The emperor had the right to name the reis-ul-ulema and the heads of majlises. Other Islamic religious officials were named by the Land Government of Bosnia and Herzegovina.

== Current Riyasats ==
- Islamic Community in Bosnia and Herzegovina, established in 1882
- Islamic Community of Montenegro, established in 1878
- Islamic Religious Community of North Macedonia, established in 1994
- Islamic Community of Serbia, established in 1868

== See also ==
- Reis ül-Küttab – Senior administrative post in the Ottoman government
