= Bajrakli Mosque, Belgrade =

Mosque in Belgrade, Serbia

Bajrakli Mosque
- Бајракли џамија Bajrakli džamija
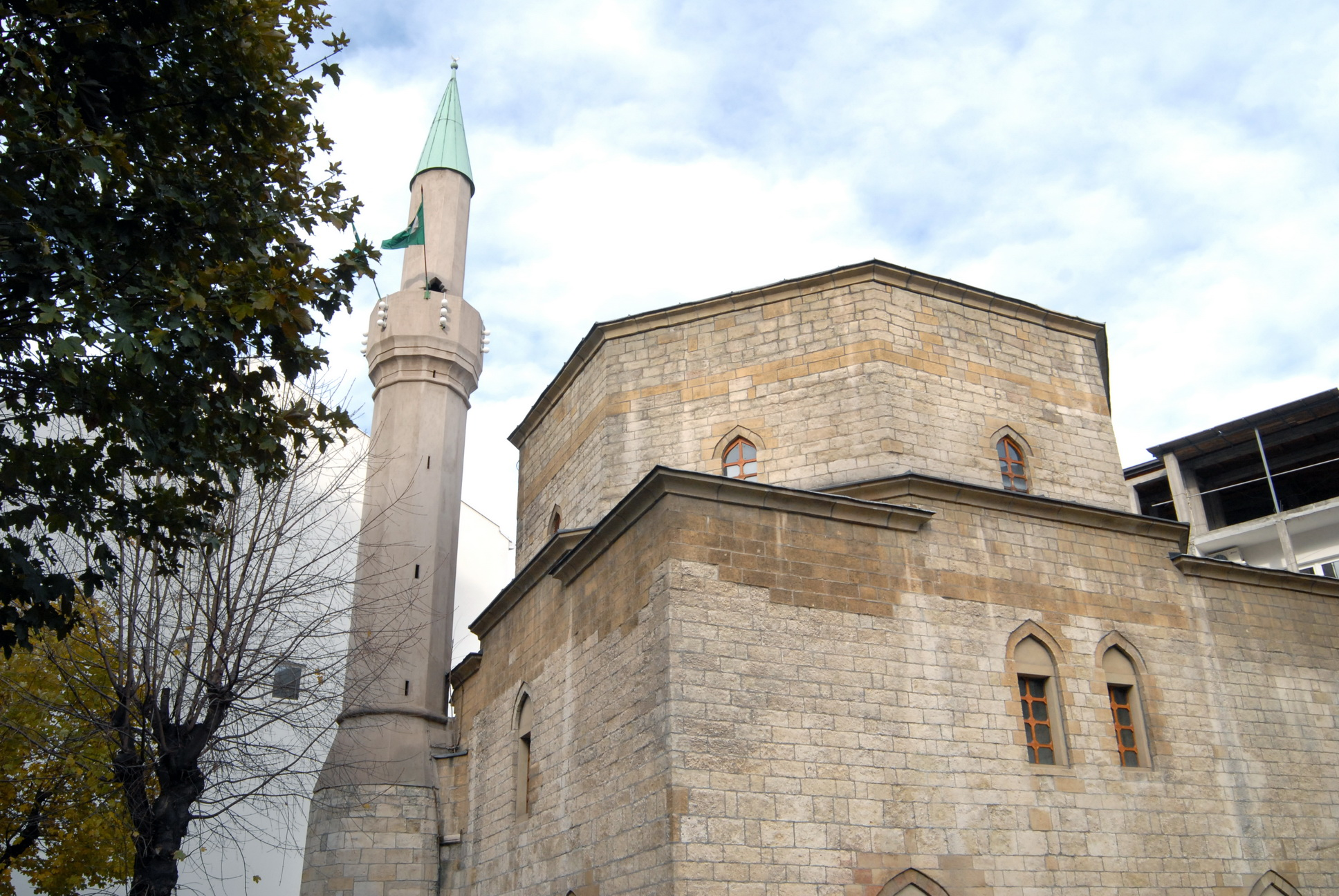

Religion
- Affiliation: Islam
- Ecclesiastical or organisational status: Mosque

Location
- Location: Belgrade, Serbia
- Interactive map of Bajrakli Mosque
- Coordinates: 44.8222°N 20.4575°E

Architecture
- Type: Mosque
- Style: Ottoman
- Completed: 1575
- Minaret: 1

The Bajrakli Mosque (Serbian: Бајракли џамија, romanized: Bajrakli džamija; named in Turkish as Bayraklı, bayrak is Turkish for "flag" and Bayraklı means "with flag") is a mosque in Belgrade, Serbia. Built around 1575, it is the only remaining mosque in the city out of the 273 that had existed during the time of the Ottoman Empire's rule of Serbia.

== History ==
Descriptions of Belgrade of the 17th century were preserved by Ottoman travel writer Evliya Çelebi in which he vividly described the appearance of the town in the period of Turkish rule, with various buildings of Islamic architecture. In the second half of the 19th century, the Bajrakli Mosque was described by historians and travel writers Konstantin Jireček, Giuseppe Barbanti Brodano, as well as by archaeologist and ethnologist Felix Kanitz. It is assumed that today's Bajrakli Mosque was built on the place of an older mesdžid, probably in the second half of the 17th century, as the endowment of the Ottoman ruler Sultan Suleiman II (1687–1691). It was originally named after former renewers, Čohadži-Hajji Alija's and later Hussein Ćehaja's mosque, while the current name was given in the late 18th or in the early 19th century. In it, as in the main mosque, there was the muwaqqit, the man who calculated the exact time of AH according to the Islamic calendar (which began in 622, i.e. in the year of Hijrah, the year during which the flight of the Prophet Muhammad from Mecca to Medina) occurred to determine sacred days, regulated clock mechanism and put the flag on the minaret, to signal the simultaneous beginning of the prayer to other Islamic places of worship in the town of Belgrade. During the occupation of Serbia by the Austrians (between 1717 and 1739), it was converted into a Roman Catholic church; but after the Ottomans retook Belgrade, it was returned to its original function.

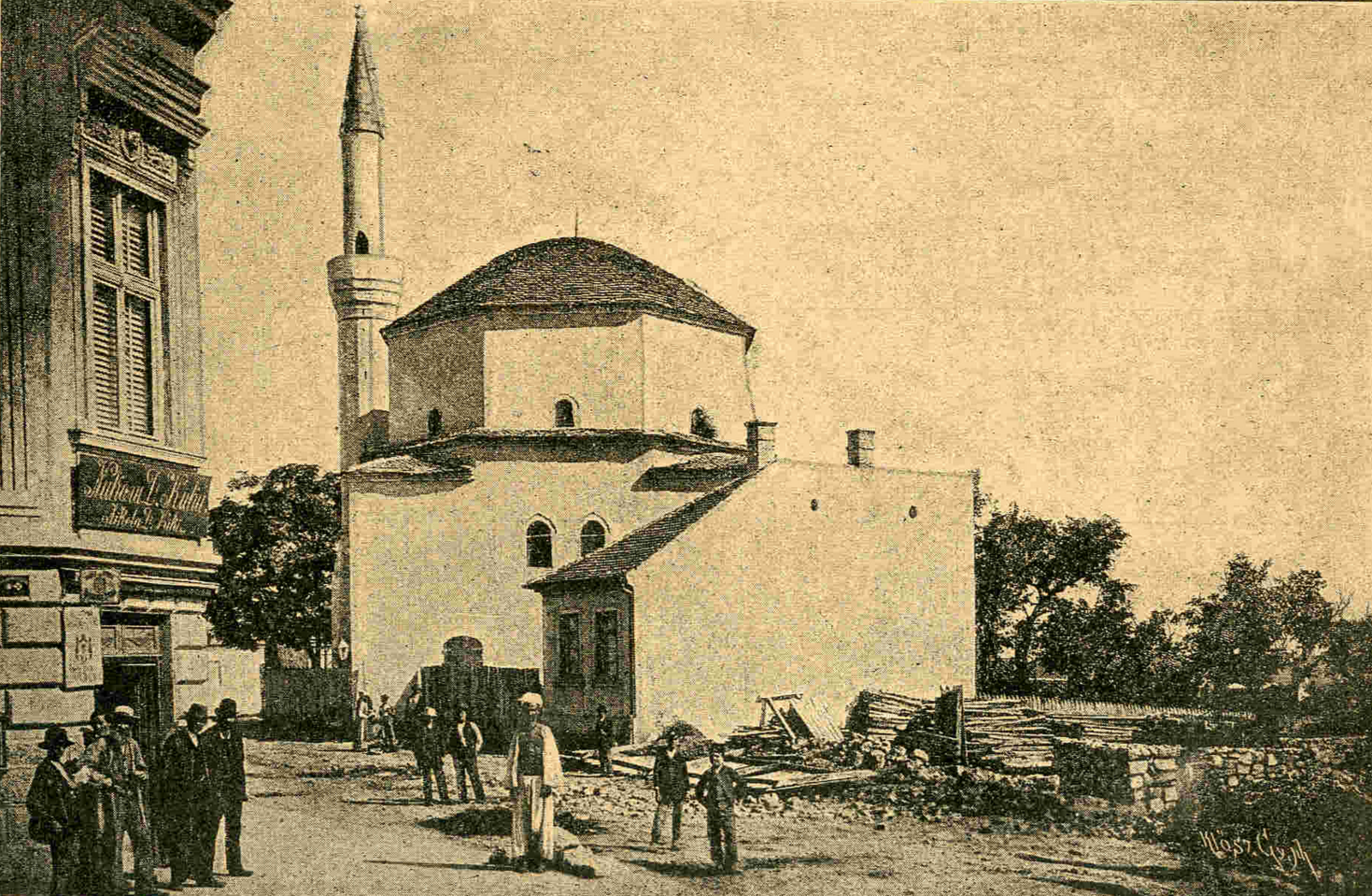
Bajrakli Mosque, 1892

In 1868, the Minister of Education and Church Affairs was ordered by Prince Mihailo Obrenovic to choose one of the existing mosques and enable it for the performance of Muslim religious rites. Besides the mosque, the courtyard building next to it was also repaired. The Minister of Education and Church Affairs sent a document to the State Council of the Principality of Serbia, dated May 10, 1868, with the following content: "In order for Mohammedans, who are on their business in Belgrade, not to be without religious consolation, His Excellency ordered the one of the local mosques to be repaired for their place of worship. Due to this high order, Bajrak mosque was chosen as the most appropriate one and the Minister of Construction as at my request sent the professional people to examine the same mosque, and a house next to it, where the mullahs will reside...."

By the decree of Prince Mihailo Obrenović from May 1868, the Minister of Education and Church Affairs was authorized to "give to khoja 240, and a muezzin 120 talirs a year", and the servants of the mosque had even income from real estate - waqf property. The first imam and the muezzin at the Bajrakli Mosque were appointed in 1868.

In the Interwar period, the mosque was restored even by the Municipality of Belgrade, when in 1935 it was protected for the first time by the Regulation on the Protection of Cultural Heritage in Belgrade. The restoration was performed several times after the World War II.

The mosque was damaged after being set on fire in 2004, in violent protest to the burning of Serbian Orthodox churches in the unrest in Kosovo. but it was later repaired. After the damage, conservation works on rehabilitation and restoration of stone facades with the restoration of window openings were carried out.

== Architecture ==
The architecture of the mosque belongs to the type of one-storey cubic building with a dome and minaret. With massive walls and small openings, it was built of stone, and some segments were carried out in brick and stone. The building has the square plan, while the octagonal dome is supported by domed arches and niches - trompes, with modest decoration of consoles. The number of windows on the facades is uneven, while the one is located on each side of the tambour of the dome. Dome supporting elements and all the openings on the building end in characteristic arches. The minaret - a thin tower with conical roof, with a circular terrace at the top, from which the faithful are called to prayer by the muezzin - is located on the northwest exterior side. Opposite the entrance, in the interior of the mosque, there is the most sacred space - the mihrab, a shallow niche with elaborate vault decoration, set in the direction of the holy city of Mecca to the southeast, while the raised wooden pulpit, mimbar, is set to the right of the mihrab, in the south-west corner. Above the entrance, there is a wooden gallery (Dikka) from which one can come to the serefa, terrace on the minaret.

The interior decoration of the mosque is very modest. The walls are without plaster with shallow moldings, rare stylized floral and geometrical motifs and calligraphic inscriptions of verses from the Quran, then with the names of the first caliphs, as well as of Allah's magnificent properties and names written in Arabic letters on a specially decorated carved panels. At the entrance to the mosque there was an arched arcade porch with three small domes. There is a fountain for prayer washing in the yard, as well as uncompleted religious school (madrassa) with the library. The Bajrakli Mosque is the main Islamic cultural center in Belgrade. Today is a bit hidden in the environment of higher housing units in Gospodar Jevremova Street.

Because of its antiquity, rarity, preservation of the original purpose, and representativeness of religious architecture and Islamic culture, in 1946 was placed under state protection as a cultural monument, and in 1979 was declared a cultural monument of great value (Decision, "Official Gazette of SRS" No. 14/79).

== Gallery ==
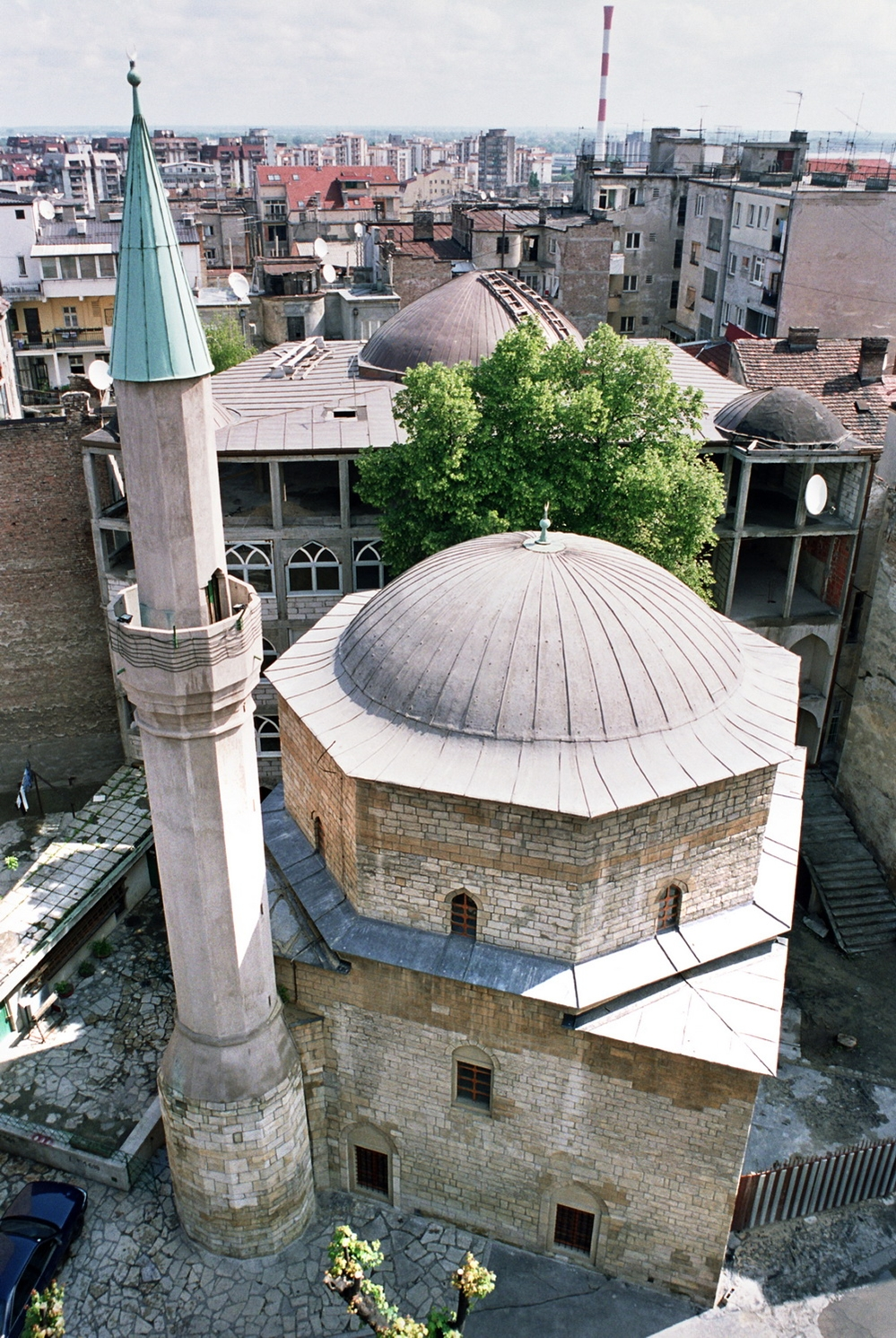

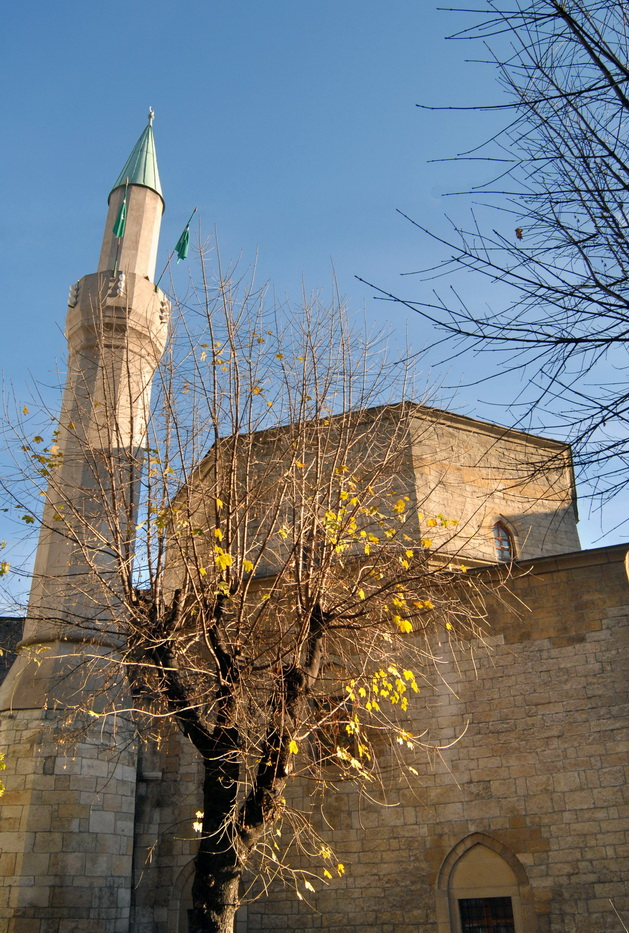

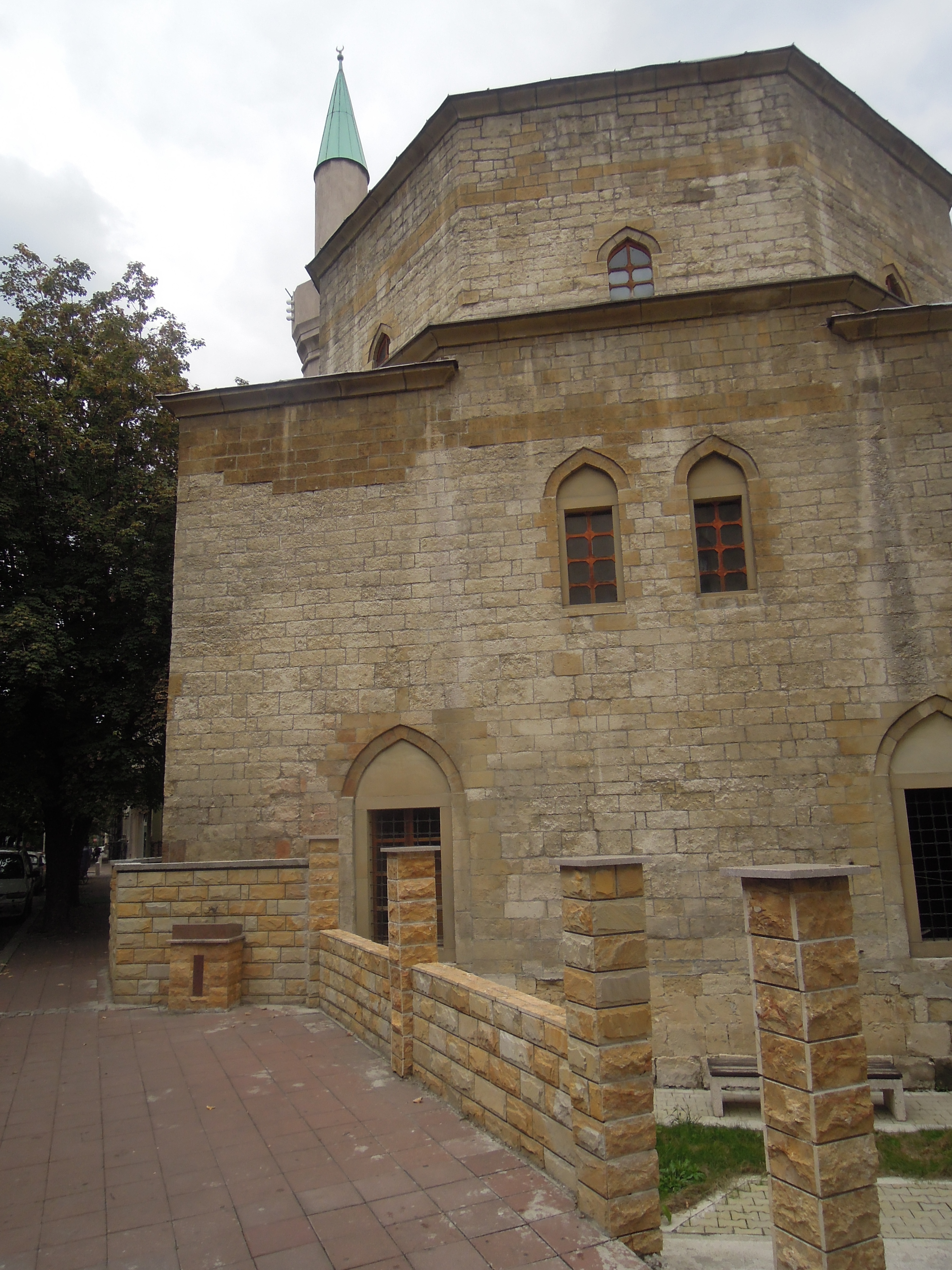

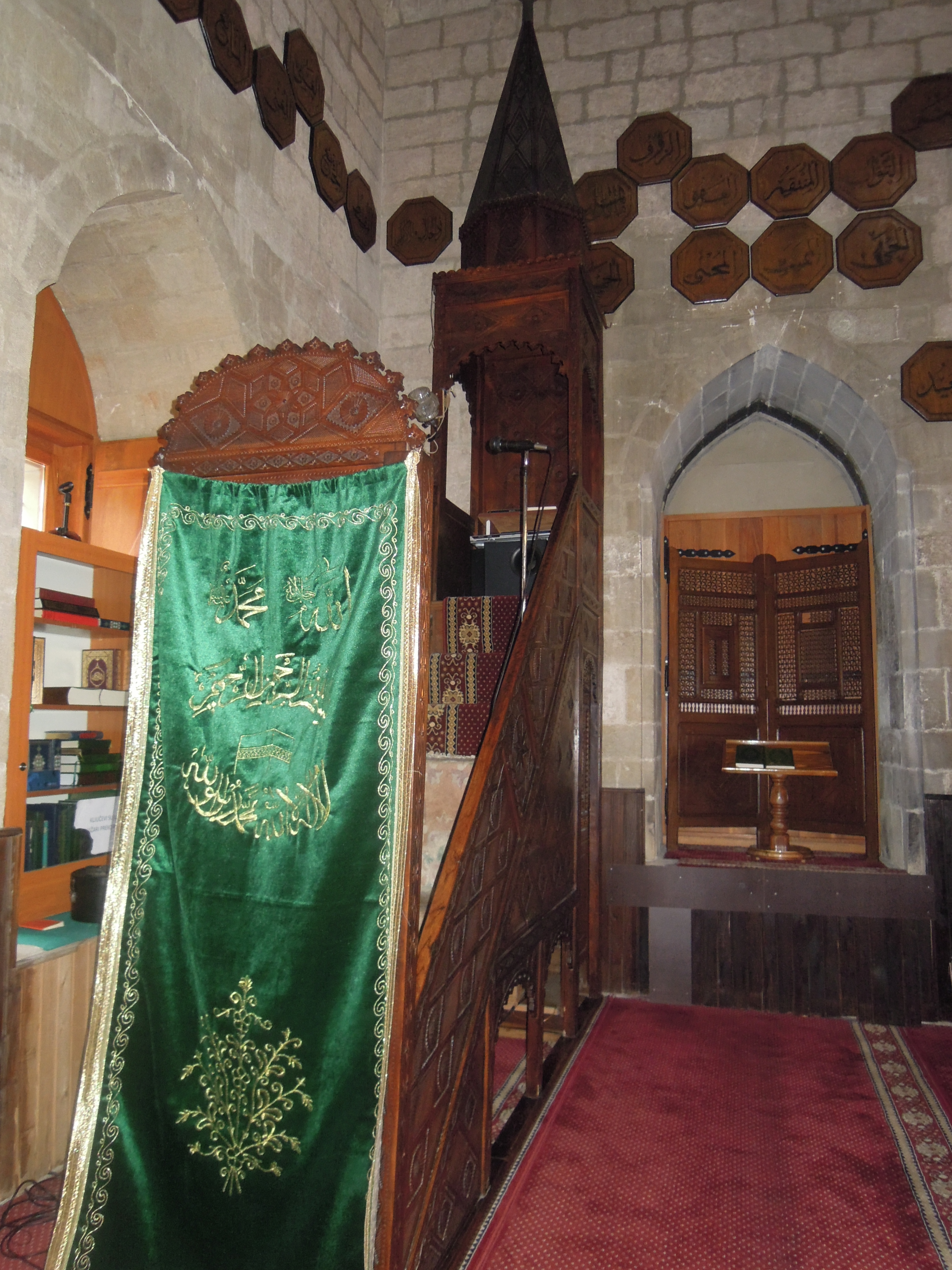

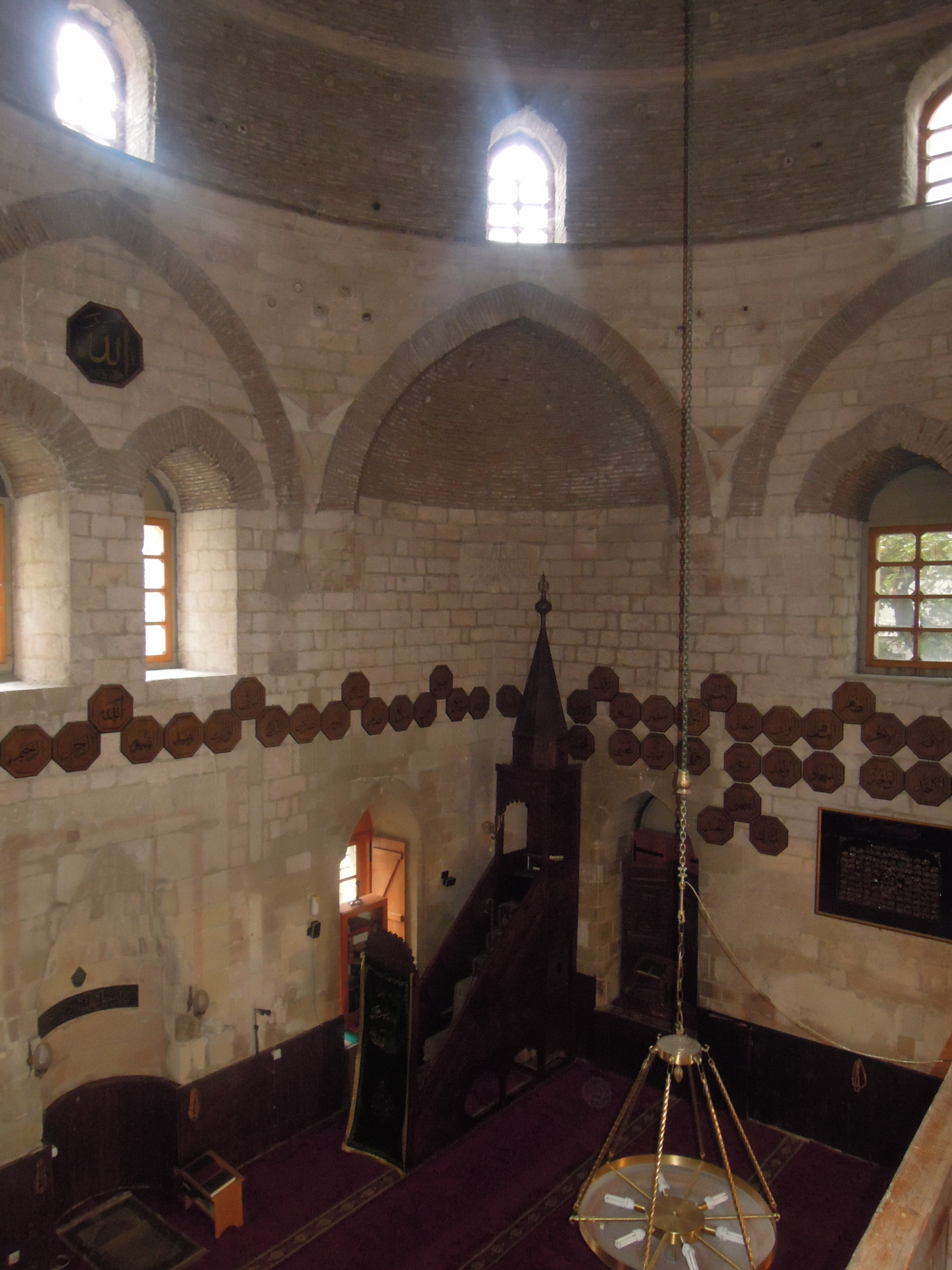

== See also ==
- Islam in Serbia
- Serb Muslims
- Exodus of Muslims from Serbia

== Bibliography ==
1. E. Çelebi, Travel Writing: Fragments on Yugoslav countries I, Sarajevo, 1979. (17th century, Istanbul, 1896)
2. F. Kanitz, Serbia - Country and Population, Vol.1, Belgrade 1989. (Leipzig, 1909)
3. A. I. Hadzic, Bajrakli Mosque in Belgrade, GGB No.4, Belgrade 1957.
4. R. Samardzic, New Century: Era of Turkish Rule 1521–1804, in History of Belgrade 1, Belgrade, 1974.
5. D. Djuric Zamolo, Beograd as Oriental Town under the Turks 1521–1867, Belgrade, 1977.
6. A. Talundžić, Bajrakli Mosque in Belgrade, Most - Journal of Education, Science and Culture No.183, 94-new series, Mostar, 2005.
7. S. Bogunović, Architectural Encyclopedia of Belgrade of the 19th and 20th Century, Belgrade, 2005.
8. Bajrakli Mosque, Dossier of Cultural Monuments of the Documentation Centre of the Cultural Heritage Preservation Institute of Belgrade.
