= Jelena (TV series) =

- Genre: Telenovela
- Created by: Joaquín Guerrero Casasola
- Starring: Danica Maksimović; Aljoša Vučković; Irfan Mensur; Ružica Sokić; Ivan Bekjarev; Bojana Ordinačev; Srđan Karanović; Iva Štrljić; Srna Lango; Dragana Vujić; Vladan Dujović; Andrej Šepetkovski; Danijel Đokić; Đorđe Erčević; Nebojša Kundačina; Aleksandar Srećković; Slobodan Ćustić
- Opening theme: "Sada znam" by Dušan Zrnić & Danica Karić
- Country of origin: Serbia
- Original language: Serbian
- No. of seasons: 5
- No. of episodes: 110 (list of episodes)

Production
- Running time: ~40 minutes
- Production company: PowerHouse Entertainment

Original release
- Network: BK TV
- Release: October 18, 2004 – May 25, 2005

Jelena (Serbian Cyrillic: Јелена) is the first Serbian telenovela ever shot. Series is shot for BK TV by PowerHouse Entertainment owned by Saša D. Karić.

== Plot ==
Belgrade in the 70's. Jelena, the daughter of a high ranked politician and Vuk, a poor young man decided to run away for her 18th birthday, but someone set them up. Jelena has been drugged and locked in her room and her father had been killed. The blame fell on Vuk and he ran from Yugoslavia. Thirteen years later he returns to Belgrade to clear his name.

== Episodes ==
Series	Episodes	Originally released	
Series	Episodes	First released	Last released
1	22	18 October 2004	23 November 2004
2	22	24 November 2004	30 December 2004
3	22	27 January 2005	4 March 2005
4	21	5 March 2005	10 April 2005
5	23	11 April 2005	25 May 2005

== Cast ==
Character	Actor	Seasons				
Character	Actor	1	2	3	4	5
Jelena Stefanović	Danica Maksimović	Main	Main	Main	Main	Main
Vuk Despotović	Aljoša Vučković	Main	Main	Main	Main	Main
Ratko Milijaš	Irfan Mensur	Main	Main	Main	Main	Main
Mirjana Bajović	Ružica Sokić	Main	Main	Main	Main	Recurring
Petar Savić	Ivan Bekjarev	Main	Main	Main	Recurring	Recurring
Helen Despotović	Bojana Ordinačev	Main	Main	Main	Main	Main
Saša Milijaš	Srđan Karanović	Main	Main	Main	Main	Main
Tatjana Pantić	Iva Štrljić	Main	Main	Main	Main	Main
Sofija Jovanović	Srna Lango	Main	Main	Main	Main	Recurring
Sandra Marković	Dragana Vujić	Main	Main	Main	Main	Main
Momir Đevenica	Vladan Dujović	Main	Main	Main	Main	Main
Gvozden Đevenica	Andrej Šepetkovski	Recurring	Main	Main	Main	Main
Mejkl Despotović	Danijel Đokić		Recurring	Main	Main	Main
Boban	Đorđe Erčević	Recurring	Recurring	Recurring	Recurring	Main
Bane	Nebojša Kundačina			Recurring	Recurring	Main
Nemanja	Aleksandar Srećković				Recurring	Main
Miša Andrić	Slobodan Ćustić	Recurring	Recurring	Recurring	Recurring	Main

=== Season 1 ===
At the beginning of season 1 we meet the characters. Main characters in season 1 are Jelena, Vuk, Ratko, Mira, Petar, Helen, Saša, Tatjana, Sofija, Sandra & Momir. Character Momir's cousin Gvozden is introduced in episode 3, character of Boban, young man who works for Ratko and Jelena and lives with them is introduced in episode 1 and character of inspector Miša Andrić is introduced in episode 9.

=== Season 2 ===
At the beginning of season 2 character of Momir's cousin Gvozden became regular cast member. In episode 11 is introduced character of Vuk's son Majkl.

=== Season 3 ===
At the beginning of season 3 character of Vuk's son Majkl became regular from this season. In episode 15 is introduced character of Bane Jelena's boss. Ivan Bekjarev departed the cast at the end of the season.

=== Season 4 ===
In episode 19 is introduced character of Nemanja, Saša's friend and news photographer. Ružica Sokić and Srna Lango departed the cast at the end of the season.

=== Season 5 ===
At the beginning of the season characters of Boban, inspector Miša Andrić, Bane and Nemanja had become regulars and Mirjana Bajović and Sofija Jovanović became recurring characters. This is also the final season of the show.

== Crew ==
- Writer: Joaquín Guerrero Casasola
- Series editor and script adaptation: Katarina Aleksić
- Series manager: Vladan Cvetković
- Executive producer: Hernan Moris (Seasons 2–5)
- Costume designer: Jasmina Sanader (Seasons 1–3), Irena Belojica (Seasons 4–5)
- Production designer: Ivana Protić
- Editor: Stevan Marić
- Director of photography: Draško Plavšić
- Director: Andrej Aćin (Seasons 1–4), Danilo Paškvan (Season 5)
