= List of Serbian telenovelas =

The first Serbian telenovela is Jelena (2004–2005)

== List ==
Year	Name	Production	Episodes	TV channel
2004–2005	Jelena	BK TV & Power House Entertainment	110	BK TV
2007–2008	Ljubav i mržnja	RTV Pink	100	RTV Pink
2007–2008	Zaustavi vreme	AVA Film	120	unaired
2017–present	Istine i laži	Prva TV & Smart Media Production	344	Prva TV
