= Jelena season 2 =

Jelena
- Season 2
- No. of episodes: 22

Release
- Original network: BK TV
- Original release: November 24 – December 30, 2004

Season chronology
- ← Previous; 1 Next → 3

Andrej Šepetkovski join the cast of Jelena in season 2.

== Plot ==
In this season character of Momir's cousin Gvozden has become a regular cast member, also in Belgrade arrives Vuk's son Majkl who is not in very good relations with Vuk.

== Cast ==
Character	Actor	Main	Recurring
Jelena Stefanović	Danica Maksimović	Entire season	/
Vuk Despotović	Aljoša Vučković	Entire season	/
Ratko Milijaš	Irfan Mensur	Entire season	/
Mirjana Bajović	Ružica Sokić	Entire season	/
Petar Savić	Ivan Bekjarev	Entire season	/
Helena Despotović	Bojana Ordinačev	Entire season	/
Saša Milijaš	Srđan Karanović	Entire season	/
Tatjana Pantić	Iva Štrljić	Entire season	/
Sofija Jovanović	Srna Lango	Entire season	/
Sandra Marković	Dragana Vujić	Entire season	/
Momir Đevenica	Vladan Dujović	Entire season	/
Gvozden Đevenica	Andrej Šepetkovski	Entire season	/
Majkl Despotović	Danijel Đokić	/	Episodes 11,20-22
Boban	Đorđe Erčević	/	Episodes 1-4,6-22
Miša Andrić	Slobodan Ćustić	/	Episodes 16,18,20

== Episodes ==
No. overall	No. in season	Title	Directed by	Written by	Original release date
23	1	Episode 2.1	Andrej Aćin	Joaquín Guerrero Casasola	24 November 2004
24	2	Episode 2.2	Andrej Aćin	Joaquín Guerrero Casasola	25 November 2004
25	3	Episode 2.3	Andrej Aćin	Joaquín Guerrero Casasola	29 November 2004
26	4	Episode 2.4	Andrej Aćin	Joaquín Guerrero Casasola	30 November 2004
27	5	Episode 2.5	Andrej Aćin	Joaquín Guerrero Casasola	1 December 2004
28	6	Episode 2.6	Andrej Aćin	Joaquín Guerrero Casasola	2 December 2004
29	7	Episode 2.7	Andrej Aćin	Joaquín Guerrero Casasola	6 December 2004
30	8	Episode 2.8	Andrej Aćin	Joaquín Guerrero Casasola	7 December 2004
31	9	Episode 2.9	Andrej Aćin	Joaquín Guerrero Casasola	8 December 2004
32	10	Episode 2.10	Andrej Aćin	Joaquín Guerrero Casasola	9 December 2004
33	11	Episode 2.11	Andrej Aćin	Joaquín Guerrero Casasola	13 December 2004
34	12	Episode 2.12	Andrej Aćin	Joaquín Guerrero Casasola	14 December 2004
35	13	Episode 2.13	Andrej Aćin	Joaquín Guerrero Casasola	15 December 2004
36	14	Episode 2.14	Andrej Aćin	Joaquín Guerrero Casasola	16 December 2004
37	15	Episode 2.15	Andrej Aćin	Joaquín Guerrero Casasola	20 December 2004
38	16	Episode 2.16	Andrej Aćin	Joaquín Guerrero Casasola	21 December 2004
39	17	Episode 2.17	Andrej Aćin	Joaquín Guerrero Casasola	22 December 2004
40	18	Episode 2.18	Andrej Aćin	Joaquín Guerrero Casasola	23 December 2004
41	19	Episode 2.19	Andrej Aćin	Joaquín Guerrero Casasola	27 December 2004
42	20	Episode 2.20	Andrej Aćin	Joaquín Guerrero Casasola	28 December 2004
43	21	Episode 2.21	Andrej Aćin	Joaquín Guerrero Casasola	29 December 2004
44	22	Episode 2.22	Andrej Aćin	Joaquín Guerrero Casasola	30 December 2004
