= Jelena season 4 =

Jelena
- Season 4
- No. of episodes: 21

Release
- Original network: BK TV
- Original release: March 5 – April 10, 2005

Season chronology
- ← Previous; 3 Next → 5

Ružica Sokić and Srna Lango departed the cast at the end of the season.

== Plot ==
Ivan Bekjarev departed the main cast at the end of the third season. He will return to the main cast at the beginning of the fifth season. Ružica Sokić and Srna Lango departed the main cast at the end of the season. The costume designer was changed. Irena Belojica replaced Jasmina Sanader as costume designer.

== Cast ==
Character	Actor	Main	Recurring
Jelena Stefanović	Danica Maksimović	Entire season	/
Vuk Despotović	Aljoša Vučković	Entire season	/
Ratko Milijaš	Irfan Mensur	Entire season	/
Mirjana Bajović	Ružica Sokić	Entire season	/
Helena Despotović	Bojana Ordinačev	Entire season	/
Saša Milijaš	Srđan Karanović	Entire season	/
Tatjana Pantić	Iva Štrljić	Entire season	/
Sofija Jovanović	Srna Lango	Entire season	/
Sandra Marković	Dragana Vujić	Entire season	/
Momir Đevenica	Vladan Dujović	Entire season	/
Gvozden Đevenica	Andrej Šepetkovski	Entire season	/
Majkl Despotović	Danijel Đokić	Entire season	/
Petar Savić	Ivan Bekjarev	/	Episodes 2,4-5
Boban	Đorđe Erčević	/	Episodes 1–7,9,11-18,20-21
Bane	Nebojša Kundačina	/	Episodes 1,5-6,9,14-19,21
Nemanja	Aleksandar Srećković	/	Episode 19
Miša Andrić	Slobodan Ćustić	/	Episodes 1–12,19-21

== Episodes ==
No. overall	No. in season	Title	Directed by	Written by	Original release date
67	1	Episode 4.1	Andrej Aćin	Joaquín Guerrero Casasola	5 March 2005
68	2	Episode 4.2	Andrej Aćin	Joaquín Guerrero Casasola	6 March 2005
69	3	Episode 4.3	Andrej Aćin	Joaquín Guerrero Casasola	10 March 2005
70	4	Episode 4.4	Andrej Aćin	Joaquín Guerrero Casasola	11 March 2005
71	5	Episode 4.5	Andrej Aćin	Joaquín Guerrero Casasola	12 March 2005
72	6	Episode 4.6	Andrej Aćin	Joaquín Guerrero Casasola	13 March 2005
73	7	Episode 4.7	Andrej Aćin	Joaquín Guerrero Casasola	17 March 2005
74	8	Episode 4.8	Andrej Aćin	Joaquín Guerrero Casasola	18 March 2005
75	9	Episode 4.9	Andrej Aćin	Joaquín Guerrero Casasola	19 March 2005
76	10	Episode 4.10	Andrej Aćin	Joaquín Guerrero Casasola	20 March 2005
77	11	Episode 4.11	Andrej Aćin	Joaquín Guerrero Casasola	24 March 2005
78	12	Episode 4.12	Andrej Aćin	Joaquín Guerrero Casasola	25 March 2005
79	13	Episode 4.13	Andrej Aćin	Joaquín Guerrero Casasola	26 March 2005
80	14	Episode 4.14	Andrej Aćin	Joaquín Guerrero Casasola	27 March 2005
81	15	Episode 4.15	Andrej Aćin	Joaquín Guerrero Casasola	31 March 2005
82	16	Episode 4.16	Andrej Aćin	Joaquín Guerrero Casasola	1 April 2005
83	17	Episode 4.17	Andrej Aćin	Joaquín Guerrero Casasola	2 April 2005
84	18	Episode 4.18	Andrej Aćin	Joaquín Guerrero Casasola	3 April 2005
85	19	Episode 4.19	Andrej Aćin	Joaquín Guerrero Casasola	8 April 2005
86	20	Episode 4.20	Andrej Aćin	Joaquín Guerrero Casasola	9 April 2005
87	21	Episode 4.21	Andrej Aćin	Joaquín Guerrero Casasola	10 April 2005
