= List of Jelena episodes =

Jelena contains five seasons. The first three seasons contains all 22 episodes, fourth season contains 21 episodes, and the fifth season consists off 23 episodes.

== Series overview ==
Series	Episodes	Originally released	
Series	Episodes	First released	Last released
1	22	18 October 2004	23 November 2004
2	22	24 November 2004	30 December 2004
3	22	27 January 2005	4 March 2005
4	21	5 March 2005	10 April 2005
5	23	11 April 2005	25 May 2005

== Episodes ==
=== Season 1 (2004) ===
- Danica Maksimović, Aljoša Vučković, Irfan Mensur, Ružica Sokić, Ivan Bekjarev, Bojana Ordinačev, Srđan Karanović, Iva Štrljić, Srna Lango, Dragana Vujić and Vladan Dujović join the cast.

No. overall	No. in season	Title	Directed by	Written by	Original release date
1	1	Episode 1.1	Andrej Aćin	Joaquín Guerrero Casasola	18 October 2004
2	2	Episode 1.2	Andrej Aćin	Joaquín Guerrero Casasola	19 October 2004
3	3	Episode 1.3	Andrej Aćin	Joaquín Guerrero Casasola	20 October 2004
4	4	Episode 1.4	Andrej Aćin	Joaquín Guerrero Casasola	21 October 2004
5	5	Episode 1.5	Andrej Aćin	Joaquín Guerrero Casasola	25 October 2004
6	6	Episode 1.6	Andrej Aćin	Joaquín Guerrero Casasola	26 October 2004
7	7	Episode 1.7	Andrej Aćin	Joaquín Guerrero Casasola	27 October 2004
8	8	Episode 1.8	Andrej Aćin	Joaquín Guerrero Casasola	28 October 2004
9	9	Episode 1.9	Andrej Aćin	Joaquín Guerrero Casasola	1 November 2004
10	10	Episode 1.10	Andrej Aćin	Joaquín Guerrero Casasola	2 November 2004
11	11	Episode 1.11	Andrej Aćin	Joaquín Guerrero Casasola	3 November 2004
12	12	Episode 1.12	Andrej Aćin	Joaquín Guerrero Casasola	4 November 2004
13	13	Episode 1.13	Andrej Aćin	Joaquín Guerrero Casasola	8 November 2004
14	14	Episode 1.14	Andrej Aćin	Joaquín Guerrero Casasola	9 November 2004
15	15	Episode 1.15	Andrej Aćin	Joaquín Guerrero Casasola	10 November 2004
16	16	Episode 1.16	Andrej Aćin	Joaquín Guerrero Casasola	11 November 2004
17	17	Episode 1.17	Andrej Aćin	Joaquín Guerrero Casasola	15 November 2004
18	18	Episode 1.18	Andrej Aćin	Joaquín Guerrero Casasola	16 November 2004
19	19	Episode 1.19	Andrej Aćin	Joaquín Guerrero Casasola	17 November 2004
20	20	Episode 1.20	Andrej Aćin	Joaquín Guerrero Casasola	18 November 2004
21	21	Episode 1.21	Andrej Aćin	Joaquín Guerrero Casasola	22 November 2004
22	22	Episode 1.22	Andrej Aćin	Joaquín Guerrero Casasola	23 November 2004

=== Season 2 (2004) ===
- Andrej Šepetkovski join the cast.

No. overall	No. in season	Title	Directed by	Written by	Original release date
23	1	Episode 2.1	Andrej AćinAndrej Aćin	Joaquín Guerrero Casasola	24 November 2004
24	2	Episode 2.2	Andrej AćinAndrej Aćin	Joaquín Guerrero Casasola	25 November 2004
25	3	Episode 2.3	Andrej AćinAndrej Aćin	Joaquín Guerrero Casasola	29 November 2004
26	4	Episode 2.4	Andrej AćinAndrej Aćin	Joaquín Guerrero Casasola	30 November 2004
27	5	Episode 2.5	Andrej AćinAndrej Aćin	Joaquín Guerrero Casasola	1 December 2004
28	6	Episode 2.6	Andrej AćinAndrej Aćin	Joaquín Guerrero Casasola	2 December 2004
29	7	Episode 2.7	Andrej AćinAndrej Aćin	Joaquín Guerrero Casasola	6 December 2004
30	8	Episode 2.8	Andrej AćinAndrej Aćin	Joaquín Guerrero Casasola	7 December 2004
31	9	Episode 2.9	Andrej AćinAndrej Aćin	Joaquín Guerrero Casasola	8 December 2004
32	10	Episode 2.10	Andrej AćinAndrej Aćin	Joaquín Guerrero Casasola	9 December 2004
33	11	Episode 2.11	Andrej AćinAndrej Aćin	Joaquín Guerrero Casasola	13 December 2004
34	12	Episode 2.12	Andrej AćinAndrej Aćin	Joaquín Guerrero Casasola	14 December 2004
35	13	Episode 2.13	Andrej AćinAndrej Aćin	Joaquín Guerrero Casasola	15 December 2004
36	14	Episode 2.14	Andrej AćinAndrej Aćin	Joaquín Guerrero Casasola	16 December 2004
37	15	Episode 2.15	Andrej AćinAndrej Aćin	Joaquín Guerrero Casasola	20 December 2004
38	16	Episode 2.16	Andrej AćinAndrej Aćin	Joaquín Guerrero Casasola	21 December 2004
39	17	Episode 2.17	Andrej AćinAndrej Aćin	Joaquín Guerrero Casasola	22 December 2004
40	18	Episode 2.18	Andrej AćinAndrej Aćin	Joaquín Guerrero Casasola	23 December 2004
41	19	Episode 2.19	Andrej AćinAndrej Aćin	Joaquín Guerrero Casasola	27 December 2004
42	20	Episode 2.20	Andrej AćinAndrej Aćin	Joaquín Guerrero Casasola	28 December 2004
43	21	Episode 2.21	Andrej AćinAndrej Aćin	Joaquín Guerrero Casasola	29 December 2004
44	22	Episode 2.22	Andrej AćinAndrej Aćin	Joaquín Guerrero Casasola	30 December 2004

=== Season 3 (2005) ===
- Danijel Đokić join the cast. Ivan Bekjarev departed the cast at the end of the season.

No. overall	No. in season	Title	Directed by	Written by	Original release date
45	1	Episode 3.1	Andrej Aćin	Joaquín Guerrero Casasola	27 January 2005
46	2	Episode 3.2	Andrej Aćin	Joaquín Guerrero Casasola	28 January 2005
47	3	Episode 3.3	Andrej Aćin	Joaquín Guerrero Casasola	29 January 2005
48	4	Episode 3.4	Andrej Aćin	Joaquín Guerrero Casasola	30 January 2005
49	5	Episode 3.5	Andrej Aćin	Joaquín Guerrero Casasola	3 February 2005
50	6	Episode 3.6	Andrej Aćin	Joaquín Guerrero Casasola	4 February 2005
51	7	Episode 3.7	Andrej Aćin	Joaquín Guerrero Casasola	5 February 2005
52	8	Episode 3.8	Andrej Aćin	Joaquín Guerrero Casasola	6 February 2005
53	9	Episode 3.9	Andrej Aćin	Joaquín Guerrero Casasola	10 February 2005
54	10	Episode 3.10	Andrej Aćin	Joaquín Guerrero Casasola	11 February 2005
55	11	Episode 3.11	Andrej Aćin	Joaquín Guerrero Casasola	12 February 2005
56	12	Episode 3.12	Andrej Aćin	Joaquín Guerrero Casasola	13 February 2005
57	13	Episode 3.13	Andrej Aćin	Joaquín Guerrero Casasola	17 February 2005
58	14	Episode 3.14	Andrej Aćin	Joaquín Guerrero Casasola	18 February 2005
59	15	Episode 3.15	Andrej Aćin	Joaquín Guerrero Casasola	19 February 2005
60	16	Episode 3.16	Andrej Aćin	Joaquín Guerrero Casasola	20 February 2005
61	17	Episode 3.17	Andrej Aćin	Joaquín Guerrero Casasola	24 February 2005
62	18	Episode 3.18	Andrej Aćin	Joaquín Guerrero Casasola	25 February 2005
63	19	Episode 3.19	Andrej Aćin	Joaquín Guerrero Casasola	26 February 2005
64	20	Episode 3.20	Andrej Aćin	Joaquín Guerrero Casasola	27 February 2005
65	21	Episode 3.21	Andrej Aćin	Joaquín Guerrero Casasola	3 March 2005
66	22	Episode 3.22	Andrej Aćin	Joaquín Guerrero Casasola	4 March 2005

=== Season 4 (2005) ===
- Ružica Sokić and Srna Lango departed the cast at the end of the season.

No. overall	No. in season	Title	Directed by	Written by	Original release date
67	1	Episode 4.1	Andrej Aćin	Joaquín Guerrero Casasola	5 March 2005
68	2	Episode 4.2	Andrej Aćin	Joaquín Guerrero Casasola	6 March 2005
69	3	Episode 4.3	Andrej Aćin	Joaquín Guerrero Casasola	10 March 2005
70	4	Episode 4.4	Andrej Aćin	Joaquín Guerrero Casasola	11 March 2005
71	5	Episode 4.5	Andrej Aćin	Joaquín Guerrero Casasola	12 March 2005
72	6	Episode 4.6	Andrej Aćin	Joaquín Guerrero Casasola	13 March 2005
73	7	Episode 4.7	Andrej Aćin	Joaquín Guerrero Casasola	17 March 2005
74	8	Episode 4.8	Andrej Aćin	Joaquín Guerrero Casasola	18 March 2005
75	9	Episode 4.9	Andrej Aćin	Joaquín Guerrero Casasola	19 March 2005
76	10	Episode 4.10	Andrej Aćin	Joaquín Guerrero Casasola	20 March 2005
77	11	Episode 4.11	Andrej Aćin	Joaquín Guerrero Casasola	24 March 2005
78	12	Episode 4.12	Andrej Aćin	Joaquín Guerrero Casasola	25 March 2005
79	13	Episode 4.13	Andrej Aćin	Joaquín Guerrero Casasola	26 March 2005
80	14	Episode 4.14	Andrej Aćin	Joaquín Guerrero Casasola	27 March 2005
81	15	Episode 4.15	Andrej Aćin	Joaquín Guerrero Casasola	31 March 2005
82	16	Episode 4.16	Andrej Aćin	Joaquín Guerrero Casasola	1 April 2005
83	17	Episode 4.17	Andrej Aćin	Joaquín Guerrero Casasola	2 April 2005
84	18	Episode 4.18	Andrej Aćin	Joaquín Guerrero Casasola	3 April 2005
85	19	Episode 4.19	Andrej Aćin	Joaquín Guerrero Casasola	8 April 2005
86	20	Episode 4.20	Andrej Aćin	Joaquín Guerrero Casasola	9 April 2005
87	21	Episode 4.21	Andrej Aćin	Joaquín Guerrero Casasola	10 April 2005

=== Season 5 (2005) ===
No. overall	No. in season	Title	Directed by	Written by	Original release date
88	1	Episode 5.1	Danilo Paskvan	Joaquín Guerrero Casasola	11 April 2005
89	2	Episode 5.2	Danilo Paskvan	Joaquín Guerrero Casasola	15 April 2005
90	3	Episode 5.3	Danilo Paskvan	Joaquín Guerrero Casasola	16 April 2005
91	4	Episode 5.4	Danilo Paskvan	Joaquín Guerrero Casasola	17 April 2005
92	5	Episode 5.5	Danilo Paskvan	Joaquín Guerrero Casasola	18 April 2005
93	6	Episode 5.6	Danilo Paskvan	Joaquín Guerrero Casasola	19 April 2005
94	7	Episode 5.7	Danilo Paskvan	Joaquín Guerrero Casasola	22 April 2005
95	8	Episode 5.8	Danilo Paskvan	Joaquín Guerrero Casasola	23 April 2005
96	9	Episode 5.9	Danilo Paskvan	Joaquín Guerrero Casasola	24 April 2005
97	10	Episode 5.10	Danilo Paskvan	Joaquín Guerrero Casasola	25 April 2005
98	11	Episode 5.11	Danilo Paskvan	Joaquín Guerrero Casasola	26 April 2005
99	12	Episode 5.12	Danilo Paskvan	Joaquín Guerrero Casasola	29 April 2005
100	13	Episode 5.13	Danilo Paskvan	Joaquín Guerrero Casasola	30 April 2005
101	14	Episode 5.14	Danilo Paskvan	Joaquín Guerrero Casasola	30 April 2005
102	15	Episode 5.15	Danilo Paskvan	Joaquín Guerrero Casasola	1 May 2005
103	16	Episode 5.16	Danilo Paskvan	Joaquín Guerrero Casasola	2 May 2005
104	17	Episode 5.17	Danilo Paskvan	Joaquín Guerrero Casasola	5 May 2005
105	18	Episode 5.18	Danilo Paskvan	Joaquín Guerrero Casasola	6 May 2005
106	19	Episode 5.19	Danilo Paskvan	Joaquín Guerrero Casasola	7 May 2005
107	20	Episode 5.20	Danilo Paskvan	Joaquín Guerrero Casasola	8 May 2005
108	21	Episode 5.21	Danilo Paskvan	Joaquín Guerrero Casasola	9 May 2005
109	22	Episode 5.22	Danilo Paskvan	Joaquín Guerrero Casasola	24 May 2005
110	23	Episode 5.23	Danilo Paskvan	Joaquín Guerrero Casasola	25 May 2005
