= Jelena season 3 =

Jelena
- Season 3
- No. of episodes: 22

Release
- Original network: BK TV
- Original release: January 27 – March 4, 2005

Season chronology
- ← Previous; 2 Next → 4

Jelena season 3, Danijel Đokić join the cast. Ivan Bekjarev departed the cast at the end of the season.

== Plot ==
In this season, the character of Vuk's son Majkl became a regular and the character of Bane, Jelena's boss was introduced in episode 15. Also, Boban is missing and he is in Siniša's house in the village. Siniša is Sonja's husband and Sofija's brother-in-law.

== Cast ==
Character	Actor	Main	Recurring
Jelena Stefanović	Danica Maksimović	Entire season	/
Vuk Despotović	Aljoša Vučković	Entire season	/
Ratko Milijaš	Irfan Mensur	Entire season	/
Mirjana Bajović	Ružica Sokić	Entire season	/
Petar Savić	Ivan Bekjarev	Entire season	/
Helena Despotović	Bojana Ordinačev	Entire season	/
Saša Milijaš	Srđan Karanović	Entire season	/
Tatjana Pantić	Iva Štrljić	Entire season	/
Sofija Jovanović	Srna Lango	Entire season	/
Sandra Marković	Dragana Vujić	Entire season	/
Momir Đevenica	Vladan Dujović	Entire season	/
Gvozden Đevenica	Andrej Šepetkovski	Entire season	/
Majkl Despotović	Danijel Đokić	Entire season	/
Boban	Đorđe Erčević	/	Episodes 1,3,6,10-11,16,18,20-22
Bane	Nebojša Kundačina	/	Episodes 15,21-22
Miša Andrić	Slobodan Ćustić	/	Episodes 2-16,19-22

== Episodes ==
No. overall	No. in season	Title	Directed by	Written by	Original release date
45	1	Episode 3.1	Andrej Aćin	Joaquín Guerrero Casasola	27 January 2005
46	2	Episode 3.2	Andrej Aćin	Joaquín Guerrero Casasola	28 January 2005
47	3	Episode 3.3	Andrej Aćin	Joaquín Guerrero Casasola	29 January 2005
48	4	Episode 3.4	Andrej Aćin	Joaquín Guerrero Casasola	30 January 2005
49	5	Episode 3.5	Andrej Aćin	Joaquín Guerrero Casasola	3 February 2005
50	6	Episode 3.6	Andrej Aćin	Joaquín Guerrero Casasola	4 February 2005
51	7	Episode 3.7	Andrej Aćin	Joaquín Guerrero Casasola	5 February 2005
52	8	Episode 3.8	Andrej Aćin	Joaquín Guerrero Casasola	6 February 2005
53	9	Episode 3.9	Andrej Aćin	Joaquín Guerrero Casasola	10 February 2005
54	10	Episode 3.10	Andrej Aćin	Joaquín Guerrero Casasola	11 February 2005
55	11	Episode 3.11	Andrej Aćin	Joaquín Guerrero Casasola	12 February 2005
56	12	Episode 3.12	Andrej Aćin	Joaquín Guerrero Casasola	13 February 2005
57	13	Episode 3.13	Andrej Aćin	Joaquín Guerrero Casasola	17 February 2005
58	14	Episode 3.14	Andrej Aćin	Joaquín Guerrero Casasola	18 February 2005
59	15	Episode 3.15	Andrej Aćin	Joaquín Guerrero Casasola	19 February 2005
60	16	Episode 3.16	Andrej Aćin	Joaquín Guerrero Casasola	20 February 2005
61	17	Episode 3.17	Andrej Aćin	Joaquín Guerrero Casasola	24 February 2005
62	18	Episode 3.18	Andrej Aćin	Joaquín Guerrero Casasola	25 February 2005
63	19	Episode 3.19	Andrej Aćin	Joaquín Guerrero Casasola	26 February 2005
64	20	Episode 3.20	Andrej Aćin	Joaquín Guerrero Casasola	27 February 2005
65	21	Episode 3.21	Andrej Aćin	Joaquín Guerrero Casasola	3 March 2005
66	22	Episode 3.22	Andrej Aćin	Joaquín Guerrero Casasola	4 March 2005
