= Jelena season 1 =

Jelena
- Season 1
- No. of episodes: 22

Release
- Original network: BK TV
- Original release: October 18 – November 23, 2004

Season chronology
- Next → 2

Danica Maksimović, Aljoša Vučković, Irfan Mensur, Ružica Sokić, Ivan Bekjarev, Bojana Ordinačev, Srđan Karanović, Iva Štrljić, Srna Lango, Dragana Vujić & Vladan Dujović joins the cast.

== Plot ==
After thirteen years Vuk returns to Serbia to clear his name and see his love Jelena. Jelena is now married for Ratko, Vuk's nemesis and they have two children, Saša and Lidija. Vuk opens corporation "Stigma" and his right hand is Tatjana Pantić. Vuk brought to Serbia his daughter Helen too. Vuk meet his old friend Petar. In Jelena's and Ratko's house works maid Mira and Ratko has lawyer Momir.

== Cast ==
Character	Actor	Main	Recurring
Jelena Stefanović	Danica Maksimović	Entire season	/
Vuk Despotović	Aljoša Vučković	Entire season	/
Ratko Milijaš	Irfan Mensur	Entire season	/
Mirjana Bajović	Ružica Sokić	Entire season	/
Petar Savić	Ivan Bekjarev	Entire season	/
Helena Despotović	Bojana Ordinačev	Entire season	/
Saša Milijaš	Srđan Karanović	Entire season	/
Tatjana Pantić	Iva Štrljić	Entire season	/
Sofija Jovanović	Srna Lango	Entire season	/
Sandra Marković	Dragana Vujić	Entire season	/
Momir Đevenica	Vladan Dujović	Entire season	/
Gvozden Đevenica	Andrej Šepetkovski	/	Episodes 3-8,11-22
Boban	Đorđe Erčević	/	Episodes 1-13,15,17-22
Miša Andrić	Slobodan Ćustić	/	Episodes 9,11,14

== Episodes ==
No. overall	No. in season	Title	Directed by	Written by	Original release date
1	1	Episode 1.1	Andrej Aćin	Joaquín Guerrero Casasola	18 October 2004
2	2	Episode 1.2	Andrej Aćin	Joaquín Guerrero Casasola	19 October 2004
3	3	Episode 1.3	Andrej Aćin	Joaquín Guerrero Casasola	20 October 2004
4	4	Episode 1.4	Andrej Aćin	Joaquín Guerrero Casasola	21 October 2004
5	5	Episode 1.5	Andrej Aćin	Joaquín Guerrero Casasola	25 October 2004
6	6	Episode 1.6	Andrej Aćin	Joaquín Guerrero Casasola	26 October 2004
7	7	Episode 1.7	Andrej Aćin	Joaquín Guerrero Casasola	27 October 2004
8	8	Episode 1.8	Andrej Aćin	Joaquín Guerrero Casasola	28 October 2004
9	9	Episode 1.9	Andrej Aćin	Joaquín Guerrero Casasola	1 November 2004
10	10	Episode 1.10	Andrej Aćin	Joaquín Guerrero Casasola	2 November 2004
11	11	Episode 1.11	Andrej Aćin	Joaquín Guerrero Casasola	3 November 2004
12	12	Episode 1.12	Andrej Aćin	Joaquín Guerrero Casasola	4 November 2004
13	13	Episode 1.13	Andrej Aćin	Joaquín Guerrero Casasola	8 November 2004
14	14	Episode 1.14	Andrej Aćin	Joaquín Guerrero Casasola	9 November 2004
15	15	Episode 1.15	Andrej Aćin	Joaquín Guerrero Casasola	10 November 2004
16	16	Episode 1.16	Andrej Aćin	Joaquín Guerrero Casasola	11 November 2004
17	17	Episode 1.17	Andrej Aćin	Joaquín Guerrero Casasola	15 November 2004
18	18	Episode 1.18	Andrej Aćin	Joaquín Guerrero Casasola	16 November 2004
19	19	Episode 1.19	Andrej Aćin	Joaquín Guerrero Casasola	17 November 2004
20	20	Episode 1.20	Andrej Aćin	Joaquín Guerrero Casasola	18 November 2004
21	21	Episode 1.21	Andrej Aćin	Joaquín Guerrero Casasola	22 November 2004
22	22	Episode 1.22	Andrej Aćin	Joaquín Guerrero Casasola	23 November 2004
