= Jelena season 5 =

Jelena
- Season 5
- No. of episodes: 23

Release
- Original network: BK TV
- Original release: April 11 – May 25, 2005

Season chronology
- ← Previous; 4

Đorđe Erčević, Nebojša Kundačina, Aleksandar Srećković and Slobodan Ćustić have joined the main cast.

== Plot ==
This is the last season. At the end Saša and Helen marries and Jelena and Vuk reconnect, Ratko is arrested and sent to jail. Sandra and Boban work in agency which is now belongs to Sandra. Sofija marries a rich man. Gvozden marries Marija a few episodes before the end of the series.

== Cast ==
Character	Actor	Main	Recurring
Jelena Stefanović	Danica Maksimović	Entire season	/
Vuk Despotović	Aljoša Vučković	Entire season	/
Ratko Milijaš	Irfan Mensur	Entire season	/
Helena Despotović	Bojana Ordinačev	Entire season	/
Saša Milijaš	Srđan Karanović	Entire season	/
Tatjana Pantić	Iva Štrljić	Entire season	/
Boban	Đorđe Erčević	Entire season	/
Sandra Marković	Dragana Vujić	Entire season	/
Momir Đevenica	Vladan Dujović	Entire season	/
Gvozden Đevenica	Andrej Šepetkovski	Entire season	/
Bane	Nebojša Kundačina	Entire season	/
Nemanja	Aleksandar Srećković	Entire season	/
Miša Andrić	Slobodan Ćustić	Entire season	/
Majkl Despotović	Danijel Đokić	Entire season	/
Mirjana Bajović	Ružica Sokić	/	Episode 23
Petar Savić	Ivan Bekjarev	/	Episodes 3–5,8,23
Sofija Jovanović	Srna Lango	/	Episodes 11–13,23

== Episodes ==
No. overall	No. in season	Title	Directed by	Written by	Original release date
88	1	Episode 5.1	Danilo Paskvan	Joaquín Guerrero Casasola	11 April 2005
89	2	Episode 5.2	Danilo Paskvan	Joaquín Guerrero Casasola	15 April 2005
90	3	Episode 5.3	Danilo Paskvan	Joaquín Guerrero Casasola	16 April 2005
91	4	Episode 5.4	Danilo Paskvan	Joaquín Guerrero Casasola	17 April 2005
92	5	Episode 5.5	Danilo Paskvan	Joaquín Guerrero Casasola	18 April 2005
93	6	Episode 5.6	Danilo Paskvan	Joaquín Guerrero Casasola	19 April 2005
94	7	Episode 5.7	Danilo Paskvan	Joaquín Guerrero Casasola	22 April 2005
95	8	Episode 5.8	Danilo Paskvan	Joaquín Guerrero Casasola	23 April 2005
96	9	Episode 5.9	Danilo Paskvan	Joaquín Guerrero Casasola	24 April 2005
97	10	Episode 5.10	Danilo Paskvan	Joaquín Guerrero Casasola	25 April 2005
98	11	Episode 5.11	Danilo Paskvan	Joaquín Guerrero Casasola	26 April 2005
99	12	Episode 5.12	Danilo Paskvan	Joaquín Guerrero Casasola	29 April 2005
100	13	Episode 5.13	Danilo Paskvan	Joaquín Guerrero Casasola	30 April 2005
101	14	Episode 5.14	Danilo Paskvan	Joaquín Guerrero Casasola	30 April 2005
102	15	Episode 5.15	Danilo Paskvan	Joaquín Guerrero Casasola	1 May 2005
103	16	Episode 5.16	Danilo Paskvan	Joaquín Guerrero Casasola	2 May 2005
104	17	Episode 5.17	Danilo Paskvan	Joaquín Guerrero Casasola	5 May 2005
105	18	Episode 5.18	Danilo Paskvan	Joaquín Guerrero Casasola	6 May 2005
106	19	Episode 5.19	Danilo Paskvan	Joaquín Guerrero Casasola	7 May 2005
107	20	Episode 5.20	Danilo Paskvan	Joaquín Guerrero Casasola	8 May 2005
108	21	Episode 5.21	Danilo Paskvan	Joaquín Guerrero Casasola	9 May 2005
109	22	Episode 5.22	Danilo Paskvan	Joaquín Guerrero Casasola	24 May 2005
110	23	Episode 5.23	Danilo Paskvan	Joaquín Guerrero Casasola	25 May 2005
