= Migrations (film) =

1988 film

- Directed by: Aleksandar Petrović
- Written by: Miloš Crnjanski; Jacques Doniol-Valcroze; Aleksandar Petrović
- Produced by: Zoran Otasevic
- Starring: Isabelle Huppert
- Edited by: Vuksan Lukovac
- Release date: 1988
- Running time: 120 minutes
- Countries: France; Yugoslavia
- Language: French

Migrations (Serbian: Seobe) is a 1988 French – Yugoslavian drama film directed by Aleksandar Petrović and starring Isabelle Huppert.

== Cast ==
- Avtandil Makharadze as Vuk Isaković
- Isabelle Huppert as Dafina Isaković
- Richard Berry as Aranđel Isaković
- Bernard Blier
- Erland Josephson
- Dragan Nikolić as Pavel Isaković
- Miki Manojlović as Arnold de Sabrant
- Rade Marković as Prince Charles Alexander of Lorraine
- Petar Božović as Field Marshal von Berenklau
- Ljubomir Ćipranić as Sekula
- Jelica Sretenović
- Dobrica Jovanović
- Jovan Janićijević Burduš
- Ružica Sokić
- Aljoša Vučković
