= Vida Alves =

Brazilian actress (1928–2017)

- Born: Vida Amélia Guedes Alves; April 15, 1928; Itanhandu, Minas Gerais, Brazil
- Died: January 3, 2017 (aged 88); São Paulo, São Paulo, Brazil
- Occupation(s): Actress, writer
- Spouse: Gianni Gasparinetti (m. 1949)

Vida Amélia Guedes Alves (April 15, 1928 – January 3, 2017) was a Brazilian actress and pioneer of early Brazilian television whose career spanned more than seventy years. In 1951, Alves made history when she and actor Walter Forster performed the first on-screen kiss ever broadcast on Brazilian television on the early telenovela series, Sua Vida Me Pertence. In 1963, Alves made television history once again by sharing the first gay kiss shown on Brazilian television with actress Geórgia Gomide on the teleteatro show, TV de Vanguarda.

Additionally, Alves co-founded the Associação dos Pioneiros da Televisão, or Association of Television Pioneers (Pró-TV), in 1995 and operated the Museu da Televisão Brasileira from her home in São Paulo.

== Biography ==
Vida Alves was born on April 15, 1928, in Itanhandu, a mining city in Minas Gerais. She moved to the city of São Paulo to pursue acting. She began her career in radio before transitioning to film and early television roles. Her film roles included Paixão Tempestuosa in 1954 and A Pequena Órfã in 1973.

Alves was cast in Sua Vida Me Pertence, Brazil's first telenovela and a pioneer of the television genre, which debuted on TV Tupi in 1951. She co-starred in the series with Walter Forster, an actor who was also TV Tupi's director. In 1951, Alves and Forster shared the first on-screen kiss ever broadcast on Brazilian television. Alves and Forster rehearsed their scene in her living room under the watch of her husband, Gianni Gasparinetti, who gave his permission. Alves and Gasparinetti were newlyweds at the time and Forster was a close friend of the couple. According to Alves, who spoke of the scene in a December 2016 interview, "We [She and Forster] lived very close, a block away...It was a technical kiss. Walter Foster showed up at my house and said, 'Let's rehearse.' My husband thought it was kind of weird, but he agreed." Alves historic kiss was performed live on television and not taped, so no copy of Brazil's first on-screen kiss exists.

Alves called the early telenovelas aired in the 1950s "simpler" than today's series, since the shows were only broadcast two or three times per week, rather than airing daily episodes.

During the 1950s and 1960s, TV Tupi also aired a teleteatro show called TV de Vanguarda, which broadcast television adaptations of literary novels and plays. Teleteatro were a type of Brazilian television show that featured a complete story arc with a beginning, middle and ending broadcast in a single, two-hour episode. In 1963, Alves appeared in an episode of the series called A Calúnia in which she and actress Geórgia Gomide shared a kiss, marking the first gay kiss ever broadcast on Brazilian television in the country's history. The plot of A Calúnia featured two staff members of an all-girls boarding school, played by Alves and Gomide, who become the subjects of rumors that they were gay. Alves plays the director of the school, while Gomide portrays her colleague. Upon hearing the rumors, outraged parents complain and the school is forced to closed. On the day the school closes, Alves and Gomide look at each other, kiss and realize they are actually in love. In a 2011 interview with Época magazine, Alves called the landmark kiss "tender", since their characters had not realized their feelings for each other until that moment.

In 1995, Alves and several television co-founded the Associação dos Pioneiros Profissionais e Incentivadores da Televisão Brasileira (Pró-TV), a professional organization. She also operated the Museu da Televisão Brasileira, including special exhibitions, at her own home in São Paulo for thirteen years.

Alves released two books focusing on her career during her later life. A biography titled Vida Alves - Sem medo de viver, authored by Nelson Natalino, was published by Editora Imprensa Oficial in 2013. Alves also wrote a second book, Televisão brasileira: O primeiro beijo e outras curiosidades (Brazilian television: The first kiss and other curiosities), which she released in 2014.

Alves was interviewed by BBC Brasil in December 2016, just weeks before her death.

Alves began suffering from declining health in 2016. She was hospitalized in Sancta Maggiore hospital in São Paulo on December 28, 2016, just weeks after her BBC Brasil interview. She died at the same hospital from multiple organ failure on January 3, 2017, at the age of 88. She was survived by two children, three grandchildren, including singer Tiê, and three great-grandchildren. Alves was buried in the Cemitério do Araçá in São Paulo.
