= Walter Forster (actor) =

Brazilian actor (1917–1996)

- Born: Walter Gerhard Forster; March 23, 1917; Campinas, Brazil
- Died: September 3, 1996 (aged 79); São Paulo, Brazil
- Occupations: Actor, writer, director
- Years active: 1949–1996

Walter Gerhard Forster (March 23, 1917 – September 3, 1996) was a Brazilian actor. He was born in Campinas to Jacob Forster, of German and Irish descent, and Ida Forster, a Swiss woman. Starting his career as an announcer in Rádio Educadora de Campinas in 1935, Forster worked on several radio stations, including Bandeirantes, Difusora, Excelsior, and Nacional. In 1951, he created and acted in the first Brazilian telenovela, Sua Vida Me Pertence, in which he performed the first on-screen kiss ever aired on Brazilian television with co-star, Vida Alves.

He was married to Branca Regina from 1942 to 1983, when she died, with whom he had a daughter, Suzana, and a son, Walter Júnior. Forster died on São Paulo from a heart attack.

== Filmography ==
Year	Title	Role	Notes
1949	Luar do Sertão		
1951	Sua Vida Me Pertence		TV series
1966	Toda Donzela Tem Um Pai Que É Uma Fera	General	
1966	Rio, Verão & Amor	Guimarães	
1966	As Cariocas		
1968	Viagem ao Fim do Mundo	Husband of Girl on Plane	
1968	Beto Rockfeller	Otávio	TV series
1968	O Homem Nu	Gibson	
1969	Os Paqueras	Toledo	
1970	A Arte de Amar Bem		(segment "A Garçonière de Meu Marido")
1971	Roberto Carlos a 300 Quilômetros por Hora		
1971	Aventuras com Tio Maneco	Alfredo	
1978	As Amantes de Um Homem Proibido		
1982	Love Strange Love	Hugo - Adult	
1982	Tessa, a Gata	Gustavo	
1982	Tchau Amor		
1983	Tudo na Cama		
1984	Um Casal de 3		
1985	Happily Ever After		
1987	Eu	Jeremias	
1987	Quincas Borba		
1993	Alma Corsária	Xavier's father	
