= Želite li da postanete milioner? =

Serbian game show

- Titles (since 2022)
- Serbian: Želite li da postanete milioner?
- (Latin)
- Serbian: Желите ли да постанете милионер?
- (Cyrillic)
- Created by: David Briggs; Mike Whitehill; Steven Knight
- Presented by: Ivan Zeljković
- Countries of origin: Federal Republic of Yugoslavia (2002-03); Serbia and Montenegro (2003-06); Serbia, Montenegro (2006, 2007-11, 2022-present)

Production
- Running time: c. 45-60 minutes

Original release
- Network: BKTV (2002–2006); B92 (2007–2009); Nacionalna (syndication) (2010); Prva (2010–2011); Nova S (2022–present)
- Release: 6 May 2002

Ask the audience in Želite li da postanete milioner? (2007-11 version)

Želite li da postanete milioner? (Serbian Cyrillic: Желите ли да постанете милионер?, Do you want to become a millionaire?) is a Serbian game show based on the original British format of Who Wants to Be a Millionaire?. The show is hosted by Ivan Zeljković.

The main goal of the game is to win 5 million Serbian dinars (3 million dinars in the original version) by answering 15 multiple-choice questions correctly. There are three lifelines – 50:50 (pola-pola), ask the host (pitajte voditelja), and phone a friend (pozovi prijatelja). Previous lifelines that were used were ask the audience (glas naroda - 2002-06, 2007-11) and switch the question (zamena pitanja - 2007-09, 2022-25).

Želite li da postanete milioner? is broadcast from 2002 to 2006, from 2007 to 2011 and from 2022 onward. From 2002 to 2006 it was shown on RTV BK Telecom, from 2007 to 2009 on B92, from 2010 to 2011 on Prva Srpska Televizija, and from 2022 onward on Nova S. From 2002 to 2006 the biggest prize was 3 million dinars, but from 2007 to 2011 and from 2022 onward it is 5 million. When a contestant gets the fifth question correct, he leaves with at least 5,000 dinars (earlier 3,000). When a contestant gets the tenth question correct, he leaves with at least 150,000 dinars (earlier 96,000).

The biggest prize ever won on this show is 1,500,000 dinars by Slobodan Rušpić from Belgrade and Raško Rob from Pančevo and by 2,500,000 dinars by Agošton Legvari from Bačko Gradište and Saša Tomić from Požarevac.

== The game's prizes ==
Question number	Question value (in RSD)		
Question number	2002–2006	2007–2011	2022–
1	300	500	1,000
2	600	1,000	2,000
3	900	1,500	3,000
4	1,500	2,500	4,000
5	3,000	5,000	5,000
6	6,000	10,000	10,000
7	12,000	20,000	20,000
8	24,000	40,000	40,000
9	48,000	80,000	80,000
10	96,000	150,000	160,000
11	192,000	300,000	320,000
12	375,000	600,000	640,000
13	750,000	1,250,000	1,125,000
14	1,500,000	2,500,000	2,500,000
15	3,000,000	5,000,000	5,000,000
