= Sua Vida Me Pertence =

Brazilian television series

- Genre: Romance; Drama
- Created by: Wálter Forster
- Directed by: Wálter Forster
- Starring: Wálter Forster; Vida Alves; Lia de Aguiar
- Country of origin: Brazil
- Original language: Portuguese
- No. of episodes: 15

Original release
- Network: TV Tupi
- Release: December 21, 1951 – February 2, 1952

Sua Vida Me Pertence (lit. 'Your Life Belongs To Me') is a Brazilian mini-series produced between 1951 and 1952. The show was broadcast in black and white by the now defunct TV Tupi in São Paulo from 1951 to 1952. The series pioneered the mini-series genre in Brazil, and featured Brazil's first live on-screen television kiss in broadcast history between actress Vida Alves and actor Wálter Forster.

Unlike standard Television show, it concentrated on one primary story line and reached a conclusion after a set number of episodes. In this format, it was an innovation of its age in Brazil, and was progenitor of the ongoing genre.

The series premiered on December 21, 1951, just over a year since the birth of TV Tupi. It was broadcast live, twice per week, for fifteen episodes, and centred upon the will-they won't-they romance between an attractive young girl, played by Vida Alves, and her lover, played by Wálter Forster, acting as a launch-pad to fame for the latter.

== Cast ==
- Vida Alves
- Walter Forster
- Lia de Aguiar
- José Parisi
- Lima Duarte
- Dionisio de Azevedo
- Néa Simões
- João Monteiro
- Astrogildo Filho
- Antonio Mojica

== See also ==
- Telenovela

== Sources ==
- https://web.archive.org/web/20070708045446/http://lass.calumet.purdue.edu/cca/gmj/sp03/gmj-sp03-rego.htm
