= Aljoša Vučković =

Yugoslav actor

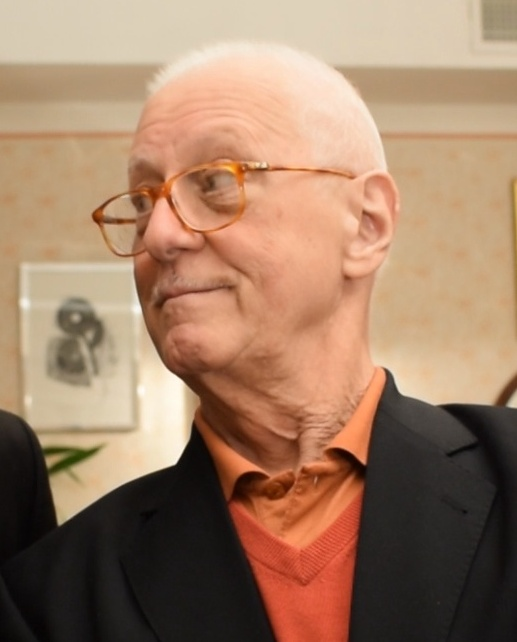
- Born: 17 December 1946 (age 79); Buzet, PR Croatia, FPR Yugoslavia
- Occupation: Actor
- Years active: 1967–2011
- Relatives: Severina (niece)

Aljoša Vučković (Serbian Cyrillic: Аљоша Вучковић; born 17 December 1946) is a Yugoslav retired actor. He appeared in more than one hundred films since 1967.

== Biography ==
He is of Croat descent. Vučković has appeared in more than one hundred films since 1967. He retired in 2009 and stopped acting in 2011.

== Selected filmography ==
Film
Year	Title	Role	Notes
1967	Kaya		
1974	Guns of War		
1979	Pakleni otok		
1988	Migrations		
1995	Premeditated Murder		
2003	The Professional		
2018	Petak 13.	Gojkov otac / Đavo	
2023	Carl's Date	Carl Fredricksen	Serbian dub

TV
Year	Title	Role	Notes
1987–1991	Bolji život	Dr. Ivo Luksić	
1987–1988	Vuk Karadžić		
1995	The End of Obrenović Dynasty		
2004–2005	Jelena	Vuk Despotović	
