= Carolina Ferraz =

Brazilian actress, television presenter, and model

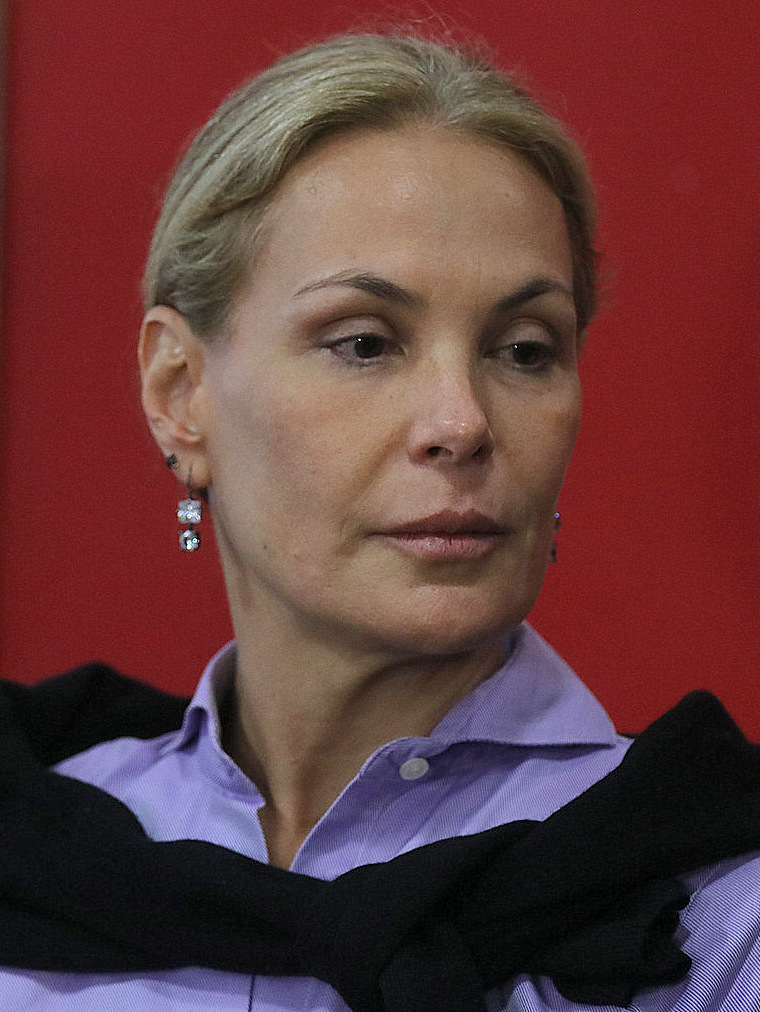
- Ferraz in 2018
- Born: Maria Carolina Álvares Ferraz; January 25, 1968 (age 58); Goiânia, Goiás, Brazil
- Occupations: Actress, TV host
- Years active: 1982–present
- Height: 1.72 m (5 ft 8 in)
- Spouse: Mário Cohen (m. 1994; div. 1998)
- Partner(s): Kiko Zambianchi (1985–1987); Murilo Benício (1999–2002); Ediz Elhadif (2006–2011); Marcelo Marins (2012–2018)
- Children: 2

Maria Carolina Álvares Ferraz (born January 25, 1968) is a Brazilian actress, TV host and former model.

== TV roles ==
- 2016 - Haja Coração as Penélope Bacellar Vélazquez
- 2013 - Além do Horizonte as Tereza
- 2012 - Avenida Brasil as Alexia Bragança
- 2011 - O Astro as Amanda
- 2011 - Amor em quatro atos as Maria
- 2010 - Na Forma da Lei as Maria Clara Viegas
- 2009 - Exagerados
- 2008 - Beleza Pura as Norma Gusmão
- 2007 - A Diarista as Sônia Laura
- 2007 - Casseta & Planeta as Flight attendant
- 2005 - Belíssima as Rebeca Cavalcanti
- 2004 - Começar de Novo as Gisela Manhães
- 2003 - Kubanacan as Rubi Calderon
- 2002 - Sabor da Paixão as Clarissa Vidigal
- 2002 - O Quinto dos Infernos (miniseries) as Naomi
- 2001 - Estrela-Guia as Vanessa Rios
- 1998 - Pecado Capital as Lucinha (Lucy Jordan)
- 1997 - Por Amor as Milena Barros Motta
- 1995 - História de Amor as Paula Sampaio Moretti
- 1994 - Pátria Minha as Beatriz
- 1994 - Tropicaliente
- 1993 - O Mapa da Mina as Bruna Torres de Almeida Lovatelli
- 1991 - O fantasma da ópera (miniseries) as Cristina Andreati
- 1991 - Floradas na Serra (miniseries) as Lucília
- 1990 - Escrava Anastácia (miniseries) as Sinhá
- 1990 - Pantanal as Young Irma

== Filmography ==
- 2025 - Caramelo as 'Martha'
- 2006 - The Passenger: Adult Secrets (O Passageiro - Segredos de Adulto)
- 2001 - Possible Loves (Amores Possíveis)
- 2000 - Mater Dei
- 1993 - Alma Corsária
