= Alma Corsária =

- Directed by: Carlos Reichenbach
- Written by: Carlos Reichenbach
- Produced by: José Eduardo Mendes Camargo; Donald Ranvaud; Carlos Reichenbach; Sara Silveira
- Starring: Bertrand Duarte; Jandir Ferrari; Andrea Richa
- Cinematography: Carlos Reichenbach
- Edited by: Cristina Amaral
- Release date: 1993
- Running time: 112 minutes
- Country: Brazil
- Language: Portuguese

Alma Corsária is a 1993 Brazilian drama film directed by Carlos Reichenbach.

== Cast ==
- Bertrand Duarte .... Rivaldo Torres
- Jandir Ferrari .... Teodoro Xavier
- Andréa Richa .... Anésia
- Flor .... Verinha
- Mariana de Moraes .... Eliana
- Jorge Fernando .... Magalhães
- Emílio Di Biasi .... pai de Anésia / tio de Artur
- Abrahão Farc .... suicidal
- Roberto Miranda .... prophet
- Paulo Marrafão .... Oscar
- David Ypond .... China
- Carolina Ferraz .... Angel
- Chris Couto .... Janete
- Amazyles de Almeida .... Olga
- André Messias .... Torres, young
- Denis Peres .... Xavier, young
- Walter Forster .... Xavier's father
- Bruno de André .... editor

== See also ==
- Abraccine Top 100 Brazilian films
