= Telenovela =

Latin American television genre

Vida Alves and Walter Forster on Sua Vida Me Pertence (Rede Tupi, Brazil, 1951), the first telenovela in television history

A telenovela (Note: /ˌtɛlənoʊˈvɛlə/ or /-nəˈvɛlə/; Spanish: [telenoˈβela], Brazilian Portuguese: [ˌtɛlenoˈvɛla]) is a type of a television serial drama or soap opera produced primarily in Latin America. The word is a portmanteau of tele (for "television") (Note: Spanish: televisión, Portuguese: televisão) and novela (meaning "novel"). (Note: Novela is the Spanish word for "novel". The word for "novel" in Portuguese is "romance", so "telenovela" should be "teleromance" in Portugal and Brazil, but due to the popularity of the Spanish term, it was adopted in Portuguese-speaking countries, which helped fuel confusion between the novel and novella literary forms ("novela" is the word for "novella" in Portuguese).) Similar drama genres around the world include Musalsala (Arab world), dizi (Turkey), serial (India), teleserye (Philippines), lakorn (Thailand), teleromanzo (Italy), téléroman (Canada, specifically Quebec), K-drama (South Korea), J-drama (Japan), C-drama (China), sinetron (Indonesia), and zat lan twe (Myanmar).

Commonly described using the American colloquialism Spanish soap opera, many telenovelas share some stylistic and thematic similarities to the soap opera familiar to the English-speaking world. The significant difference is their series run length; telenovelas tell one self-contained story, typically within the span of a year or less whereas soap operas tend to have intertwined storylines told during indefinite, continuing runs. This makes them shorter than most other television series, but still much longer than a miniseries. This planned run results in a faster-paced, more concise style of melodrama compared to a typical soap opera. Episodes of telenovelas usually last between 30 and 45 minutes, and rarely more than an hour, except for final episodes. The telenovela combines drama with the 19th century feuilleton and the Latin American radionovela. The medium has been used frequently in various countries to transmit sociocultural messages by incorporating them into storylines.

By the 1950s, Brazil became one of the first countries to produce novelas with high budgets and aimed both to the national and international markets. Mexico soon followed, and by the 1970s and 1980s the country started to engage more profusely in using telenovelas to shape behavior. This was particularly successful in introducing the idea of family planning. The 1990s played a key role in the international export of telenovelas, thus the so-called 'Telenovela Craze' that spread in many regions in the world.

== History ==
Brazil is considered the pioneer of the telenovela genre. In 1951, Brazil produced Sua vida me pertence ("Your Life Belongs to Me"), the first telenovela in the world. In 1952, Cuba released Senderos de amor ("Paths of Love") and Mexico released Ángeles de la calle ("Angels of the Street"), shown once a week. Between 1957 and 1958, Mexico produced its first drama serial in the modern telenovela format of Monday to Friday slots, Senda prohibida ("Forbidden Path"), written by Fernanda Villeli. The first global telenovela was A Escrava Isaura ("Isaura the Slave Girl", Brazil, 1976), which was exported to Russia, China, the United States and other countries.

Inexpensively produced on bare sets, studios churned out three or four telenovela episodes a day; actors wore radio earpieces that gave them dialogue lines and stage directions. by the 1970s telenovelas were so popular in Latin America that they had almost completely pushed out American imported programs. Two or three were broadcast consecutively during prime time.

== Genres ==
Every one has the same essential theme: a poor but beautiful country girl comes to the big city, works as a maid in a rich household, is seduced, has an illegitimate baby, but prospers and opens a chic boutique or marries a millionaire playboy. Variations on the theme are endless.

— Timothy Green, 1972

Telenovelas tend to fall within these categories:

- Working-class melodrama, which is the most popular to date, easy to understand and contains less explicit content. This is heavily reliant of the common rags-to-riches plot, typically featuring a poor woman who falls in love with a rich man whose family spurns her, such as the Las Tres Marias ("Maria Trilogy"): Maria Mercedes in 1992, Marimar in 1994 and Maria la del Barrio ("Maria from the slum") in 1995. All these telenovelas starred Thalía in the principal role.
- Historical romance is set in the past, such as the Latin American colonial period (Martín Garatuza, 1986; Xica da Silva, 1996), the Second Mexico Empire and restoration of the Republic (El carruaje "The Carriage", 1972), the "Porfiriato" on Mexico's late 19th/early 20th Century (El vuelo del águila "The Flight of The Eagle", 1994), the European Immigration to Latin America on late 19th/early 20th Century (Terra Nostra "Our Land" in Italian,1999; Argentina, tierra de amor y venganza "Argentina, Land of Love and Revenge" 2019; Esperança "Hope" 2002), the Mexican Revolution (Bodas de odio "Weddings of Hate", 1982), the process of independence in Spanish America and Brazil (Novo Mundo "New World", 2017; La Pola 2010; Bolívar 2019), the Second Imperial Period in Brazil (Nos tempos do Imperador, "In the age of Emperor" 2021) and the 20th-century military dictatorships in the South Cone (such as Anos Rebeldes "Rebellious Years", 1992).
- Teen drama, which portrays the lives of high school teenagers and their issues with sex, drugs and other coming-of-age topics. This genre started with Quinceañera in 1987.
- Mystery/thriller is a category of telenovela that is more cold-hearted than the other subgenres. It may portray a mysterious death or disappearance, which may tear couples, even families apart, such as Cuna de Lobos ("Wolves Crib"), La Casa al Final de la Calle ("The House at the Street End"), La Mujer de Judas ("The Juda's Woman"), ¿Dónde está Elisa? ("Where's Elisa?"), El Rostro de la Venganza ("The Face of Revenge") or La Casa de al Lado ("The House Next Door"). Chile has produced a lot this genre.
- Musical, which portrays musical stories with songs sung by the characters. Examples include, Guerra de ídolos, Floribella, La reina soy yo, Violetta and Vai na Fé.
- Horror is a less common subgenre of telenovelas, it can deal with anything of the horror genre, but the majority of these telenovelas deal with the themes of the supernatural like demons, witchcraft, ghosts, and the occult. It is one of the few subgenres that use special effects. It always portrays the main protagonist trying to find out the truth while at the same time confronting frightening events and the main antagonist which is always a witch or a warlock, demon, evil or vengeful ghost, or the devil itself such as El Maleficio ("The Curse"), El Extraño Retorno de Diana Salazar ("The Strange Return of Diana Salazar"), La Poseída ("The Possessed"), La chacala and La Mujer de Judas ("The Juda's Woman").
- Epic, which portrays the epic characters' stories and lives for fiction and the Bible. Examples include, Os Dez Mandamentos.
- Romantic comedy, which portrays love stories with some or much comedy such as Las tontas no van al cielo ("Fools Don't Go to Heaven") or Yo soy Betty, la fea ("Ugly Betty"), the most successful telenovela in history.
- Pop band story portrays the lives of aspiring popstars such as in Alcanzar una estrella ("Reaching a Star", 1990) and its sequel Alcanzar una estrella II (1991), as well as Rebelde Way ("Rebel Way") and the Mexican remake Rebelde ("Rebel", 2004), which spawned a multi-platinum pop group, RBD. Some, though not all, of these types of telenovelas are geared towards a teenage and/or pre-teen audience.
- Drug smuggling telenovelas have become frequently produced in recent times like La Reina del Sur ("The Queen of South"). Some of them are based in real drug traffickers like El Cartel, based on the Colombian Cartel de Cali, and Pablo Escobar: El Patrón del Mal ("Pablo Escobar: The Drug Lorder"), based on Pablo Escobar life.
- Sci-fi is not a common topic of telenovelas, but some productions have tried to introduce this theme to the telenovela genre. Examples: O Clone ("The Clone") about human cloning, Aurora and O Tempo não para (English title: "Crashing Into the Future") about the cryonics , Casi Ángeles ("Almost Angels") about time travel and human chip implant, and El rostro de Analía ("The Face of Analía") about facial reconstruction .
- Political telenovelas are not so common. Politics is not usually the central theme in telenovelas, due to strong censorship in Latin America (See Censorship in Mexico, Censorship in Venezuela, Censorship in Brazil). However, there are some exceptions to telenovelas with a strong political approach like Por Estas Calles ("On These Streets"), La Candidata ("The Candidate"), O Bem Amado ("The Beloved"), Primera Dama ("First Lady") and La Mujer del Presidente ("The wife of the president"). The telenovelas A Calzón Quitado (English title: "The Naked Truth") and Cosita rica ("Wonderful Thing") indirectly portrays (in a satirical way) the Ex Venezuelan President Hugo Chávez, with the characters of "Pedro Elías Ferrer" and "Olegario Pérez", both played by the actor Carlos Cruz.

Besides these, another category of series that has become popular in recent years is the youth telenovela, which borrows some elements of the teen drama format but is usually more family-oriented in structure, contains comedic elements and sometimes maintains a high concept or supernatural plotline (such as 11:11: En mi cuadra, nada cuadra and Chica vampiro).

Telenovelas have geographically diverged into two major groups – the Latinovelas, and the Asianovelas, portmanteaus of Latin and Asian with novelas. Telenovelas, in particular, are the most popular non-English-speaking scripted forms of entertainment in the world to date.

Novelas made in Spain and the Spanish-speaking Americas are widely popular in Spanish-speaking countries and communities.

Novelas made in Portugal and Brazil are highly popular in Lusophone countries, with Angolan novelas also making their way recently.

Some novelas also have a huge following in Europe's Mediterranean and eastern countries, as well as in Asia and Oceania. Latinovelas are primarily responsible for the telenovela trend in regions outside of Latin America, which is known as the biggest producer of telenovelas up until the early 2000s.

== Millennial telenovela ==
In the 2010s, the terms "millennial telenovela" and "modern telenovela" have been coined to describe an emerging genre related to the telenovela. Based in the same culture, the target audience is much younger (the millennials); the typical storylines and melodrama were recreated to better appeal to this demographic. Commenters have written that a millennial telenovela will contain many of the following themes: it fits into contemporary politics and culture; has positive representations of LGBT+ people when present; features themes of female empowerment and the sexualization of the male body; involves use of social media; presents characters of moral ambiguity rather than in black and white, and with more complexity; contains intentionally comedic moments; and is centered on an unconventional family.

Though the term "millennial telenovela" was first used in 2016 when BuzzFeed and Telemundo co-produced a short series to cater for the emerging Latin American millennial market, it became more widely used in 2018 after the success of the Netflix black comedy The House of Flowers. (Note: See also: The House of Flowers: Status as a telenovela)

The development of the genre may be a response to a controversial market practice of importing telenovelas to US channels, with a Univision and Televisa deal having to be renegotiated when traditional telenovelas fell in popularity around 2016; at this point, the majority of Hispanic people in the US were millennials, and "drawn to edgier and more fast-paced programs than traditional telenovelas." Though Univision did not start making its own hybrid shows, they began investing in online and multimedia programming, and bought into Netflix's original Mexican programming.

Series described as millennial telenovelas

- Jane the Virgin
- Much Ado About Nada
- Miss Farah
- Helluva Boss
- The House of Flowers
- Luis Miguel: The Series
- Telenovela
- Ugly Betty
- Devious Maids
- Degrassi: The Next Generation
- Scars of Beauty

== Major producers of telenovelas ==
Some of the world's major producers of telenovelas include the following:

- North America
  - United States
    - Telemundo, Univision
  - Canada
    - CBC (Ici Radio-Canada Télé), TVA, Noovo, TFO
- Latin America
  - Argentina
    - Telefe, El Trece, Pol-Ka, Underground Producciones
  - Brazil
    - Globo, RecordTV, SBT, Band, Max Manchete (defunct), Tupi (defunct) and Excelsior (defunct)
  - Chile
    - TVN, Canal 13, Mega, Chilevisión
  - Colombia
    - Caracol, RTI, RCN
  - Ecuador
    - Ecuavisa, TC Televisión
  - Mexico
    - Televisa, TV Azteca, Argos Comunicación
  - Peru
    - América Televisión, ATV, Inka Visión
  - United States (Puerto Rico)
    - WAPA-TV, WKAQ-TV
  - Venezuela
    - Venevisión, RCTV (defunct), Marte TV, VTV, Televen
- Europe
  - Spain
    - Telecinco, Antena 3, EITB (in Basque), TV3 (in Catalan)
  - Portugal
    - RTP, TVI, SIC
  - Germany
    - ARD (Das Erste), ZDF, ProSieben, Sat.1, RTL
  - Croatia
    - HRT, RTL, Nova TV
  - Serbia
    - RTS, BK TV, Prva, Pink
  - Russia
    - Channel One Russia, STS, NTV, VGTRK, Peretz, TNT, REN TV, TV-3
  - Georgia
    - 1TV, Imedi TV, Rustavi 2, GDS TV, TV Pirveli, Mtavari TV, Formula TV, Adjara TV
- Middle East and North Africa
  - Arab world
    - MBC4 (defunct)
- Asia
  - Philippines
    - ABS-CBN, GMA, TV5
  - East Timor
    - RTTL
  - Turkey
    - TRT, Kanal D, Star TV, ATV, Show TV, NOW, Kanal 7, TV8, Samanyolu TV (defunct)
  - South Korea
    - KBS, MBC, SBS, tvN, OCN, JTBC, Channel A, MBN, TV Chosun, ENA
  - Thailand
    - Channel 3, Channel 7, Channel 8, One 31, GMM 25
  - Pakistan
    - Hum TV, Geo TV, Geo Entertainment, PTV
  - India
    - Zee TV, &TV, Zee Bangla, Zee Punjabi, Zee Telugu, Zee Kannada, Zee Tamil, ZEE5, Zindagi Sony Entertainment Television, Sony SAB, Colors TV, Colors Bangla, Colors Marathi, Colors Tamil, DD Metro, DD National, StarPlus, Hotstar, Life OK, Star One, Star Vijay, Star Bharat, Star Jalsha, Sun TV, Sahara One, Gemini TV, Imagine TV, ALTBalaji, Asianet
  - Malaysia
    - Astro Ria, TV3, 8TV, TV9, NTV7
  - Singapore
    - Mediacorp
  - Indonesia
    - RCTI, SCTV, Indosiar, ANTV, MNCTV

== Telenovelas by country ==
=== Arab world ===
In the Arab world, musalsal (Arabic: مسلسل) are a type of serial drama with a similar format to telenovelas; they are often historical dramas focusing on Islamic figures and stories from the Islamic faith, or stories involving social or political issues within a country's culture.

Musalsalat are traditionally associated with the Islamic holy month of Ramadan; the iftar at sunset (where Muslims are allowed to break their day-long fast) coincides with prime time and family viewing, and broadcasters often extend their prime time hours through the suhur (the pre-dawn meal before the fajr prayer and beginning of fasting) to maximize advertising revenue from this increased audience. Broadcasters traditionally premiere new musalsalat during Ramadan, which are usually 30 episodes in length so that they last the duration of the month. Pierre Abi-Saab described these dramas as being "closely linked to oral culture, storytelling and spectacles", and the tradition of hakawati (storytellers).

Most musalsalat originate from countries such as Egypt, Jordan, Kuwait, and Syria (although conflicts such as the Syrian civil war have impacted its output, with many Syrian productions electing to film in countries such as Lebanon instead). In Egypt, new musalsal do not usually premiere outside of Ramadan, with reruns airing over the remainder of the year.

=== Argentina ===
Argentina's telenovelas generally focus on melodramatic twists of traditional middle class life, with touches of comedy. Many telenovelas are broadcast by the main television networks, Canal 13 and Telefe. Oriented mostly to female viewers in the 1960s, their scope moved to more wide audiencies by the early 1990s, and "youth telenovelas", aimed primarily at teenagers, are produced since then. Argentine youth telenovelas have become hits in other countries, where they have been remade or rebroadcast. Some well known youth telenovelas include Chiquititas ("Tiny Angels"), Rebelde Way, Floricienta, Muñeca Brava ("Wild Angel"), Violetta and Patito Feo ("Ugly Duckling").

=== Bolivia ===
In Bolivia, themes of drama, romance, music, natural landscapes, remote situations and adventure are common. Some are based on novels, historical and factual events. Such melodramas produced in Bolivia include Las Tres Perfectas Solteras, Indira, Tierra Adentro, La Virgen de las 7 calles, Luna de Locos and Tres de Nosotras. The country has made over 15 telenovelas so far, and most of the productions take place in Santa Cruz de la Sierra. The majority of telenovelas shown on domestic television networks are international productions (imported from Brazil, Colombia, Argentina and Mexico). A lot of Bolivian telenovelas are produced by independent producers, since many producers are more dedicated to the country's film industry.

=== Brazil ===
Brazilian telenovelas (more often "novelas") are both more realistic and apt to broach controversial subjects. These programs tend to showcase realistic depictions of middle class, working class and upper class individuals in society. Brazilian productions are the highest-budget telenovelas in South America. Escrava Isaura (1976) was a major hit in South America, the Eastern Bloc, Africa and China. Novelas usually last six to eight months at most in Brazil. One of the longest-running telenovelas in the country, however, is the teen-oriented Malhação (Young Hearts), which aired from 1995 until 2020. As such, it is commonly classified as a Western-format soap opera instead.

Brazilian telenovelas often have convoluted subplots involving three or four different settings. Usually, there is a rich setting, a poor setting and one or more settings in which the characters of both settings can interact. There is no clear-cut line between "good" and "evil" characters, with protagonists often displaying weaknesses such as promiscuity, drinking, drug abuse, stupidity and excessive ambition, among others. Antagonists equally show positive features or motivations, including abuses suffered in the past, family problems and poverty.

It is not uncommon for a villain to attract the sympathy of the public, or even to have their storylines conclude with a satisfactory ending. For instance, in the novela Belíssima ("Most Beautiful") in 2006, villainess Bia Falcão (played by Fernanda Montenegro) escaped a police siege and fled to France, where she settled with a boyfriend, living using a secret bank account in Switzerland that she had maintained prior. It is also not uncommon for a hero to be relegated to a secondary role, due to an actor's lack of charisma. Besides the convoluted plots, Brazilian telenovelas approach sensitive social issues and try to present some of Brazil's actual culture, occasionally in an idealized way.

Another important characteristic of Brazilian telenovelas is that they rely less on individual stars than other South American works. A Brazilian telenovela may have a permanent cast of more than 40 actors, of which some seven or eight are considered "central" to the show. The chief reason for this is that telenovelas are not shot in advance. Instead, chapters are shot around two weeks before their airdate, so that they can respond to public reaction. Under this scheme, the occasional poor performance of the actor playing the main character may turn the production into a flop, which happened with the 1982 telenovela Sol de Verão ("Summer Sun") after the death of main star Jardel Filho and in 2016, in Velho Chico ("Old River"), after the death of lead-actor Domingos Montagner.

=== Canada ===
In Canada, telenovelas are known as téléromans in French and are a part of the culture of the Francophone province of Quebec. Nearly all television stations in the country that broadcast in the French language carry téléromans. The first téléroman was La famille Plouffe ("The Plouffe Family"), which was broadcast on Radio-Canada in the 1950s.

The téléroman was created during the earliest days of the Canadian Broadcasting Corporation's television network, when CBC was the only television network in Canada (as per the 1949 Massey Commission). Whereas theoretically, CBC's main English-language television network could broadcast English-language shows from American stations (and also was forced to compete with U.S. television networks), CBC's Radio-Canada network had to develop its own programmes for French-Canadian viewers. As a consequence, Francophone television in Canada developed differently from Anglophone television.

In 2003, Ontario's provincial French-language public television service, TFO, began broadcasting the first Franco-Ontarian téléroman, Francoeur.

Beginning with its tenth season in 2010, Degrassi: The Next Generation was produced and broadcast in a style similar to the telenovelas format. This lasted until episode 21 of the twelfth season in 2012. Degrassi: Next Class also adapts this format for its broadcast on Family Channel.

=== Chile ===
Chilean telenovelas typically focus on both traditional drama and middle-class life, with some touches of comedy. Often, these programs show life outside of the capital, like with the TVN novela Iorana (which took place on Easter Island). Telenovelas in the country are usually produced and broadcast by Canal 13, and the public broadcaster Televisión Nacional de Chile (TVN), which debut their main telenovelas in March each year with a few days between their premiere dates, which have led marketing to a "telenovela war" of sorts. Lately, other Chilean television networks such as Mega and Chilevisión are joining the so-called "telenovela war". Many of the most successful telenovelas in Chile are set in a historical era such as Pampa Ilusión (1935), El señor de La Querencia (1920), Los Pincheira (1918), Secretos en el jardín (1981) or Perdona nuestros pecados (1953–1961).

=== Colombia ===
Colombian telenovelas such as Betty la fea ("Betty, the ugly one") often focus on comedic storylines. However, some are of a more realistic vein or are adaptations of novels.

The first Colombian telenovela was El 0597 está ocupado, produced in 1959 by the programadora Producciones PUNCH. From then until the late 1990s arrival of private television in the country, a variety of programadoras produced and aired their own telenovelas, such as those from Colombiana de Televisión, TeVecine, Cenpro Televisión (the producer of Perro amor, which was popular in the late 1990s).

Telenovelas produced by RTI Colombia and Telemundo are usually shown and produced on Caracol, while Televideo and Fox Telecolombia produce some of RCN's telenovelas. Caracol and RCN also produce and broadcast their own shows. Currently, four or five Colombian telenovelas are usually broadcast from 6:00 to around 11:00 p.m. on those networks.

It is notable that many novelas designed and written by Colombians sell outside the country well, as a prime export. Other countries then localize them by creating novelas based on the same story, barely changing names, settings and, more often than not, mixing the cast with Colombian actors to respect ownership/property agreements and copyright laws. One fine example is Betty, la fea (adapted by ABC in the United States as Ugly Betty) in which the franchise for the storyline was translated and adapted by over 30 networks around the world.

=== Croatia ===
The first Croatian telenovela was Villa Maria, made in 2004 by AVA Production. After Villa Maria, AVA made Ljubav u zaleđu (2005–2006), Obični ljudi (2006–2007), Ponos Ratkajevih (2007–2008) and Zakon ljubavi (2008). Telenovelas made by AVA were aired in more than 25 countries.

With Serbian FOX Televizija, RTL Televizija made Croatian version of Yo soy Betty, la fea called Ne daj se, Nina (2007). After that RTL made Ruža vjetrova (2011–2013), Tajne (2013–2014), Vatre ivanjske (2014–2015) and Prava žena (2016–2017). Ring Multimedia production made Sve će biti dobro (2008–2009), Dolina sunca (2009–2010) and Pod sretnom zvijezdom (2011) for Nova TV. Nova TV itself made some telenovelas too: Najbolje godine (2009–2011), Larin izbor (2011–2013), Zora dubrovačka (2013–2014), Kud puklo da puklo (2014–2016), Zlatni dvori (2016–2017) and Čista ljubav (2017–2018).

=== Dominican Republic ===
Television networks in the Dominican Republic have started to produce their own novelas through Venevision International, Iguana Productions and Antena Latina Productions. The first Dominican telenovela, María José, oficios del hogar ("María José, Housewife"), was produced by Venevision and television station Color Visión, which formed the first Dominican telenovela company (now inactive) in 1986. Comedy-drama series such as Catalino el Dichoso and sequel En La Boca de los Tiburones were also considered telenovelas during the early 1990s. The telenovela Tropico was produced by Venevision International, Iguana Productions, and Antena Latina Productions, in 2007 with mostly Dominican actors and a few from Venezuela and Peru. It aired domestically on Antena Latina 7 and in United States on Univision. There are currently plans for more telenovelas to be filmed and produced in the Dominican Republic.

=== Germany ===
In 2004, Germany began producing its own telenovelas. All German telenovelas are formatted as melodramatic love stories. With the exception of Storm of Love ("Sturm der Liebe"), which is produced by Bavaria Film Studios, and Rote Rosen which is produced by Studio Hamburg Serienwerft, every German telenovela is produced by Grundy UFA. The most successful ones, Bianca – Wege zum Glück ("Bianca: Paths to Happiness"), Wege zum Glück ("Paths to Happiness"), Verliebt in Berlin ("In Love in Berlin"/"In Love with Berlin"), Storm of Love and Rote Rosen, were also syndicated in Italy, France and other European countries; Verliebt in Berlin was also syndicated in Canada. German television channels ARD, ZDF, Sat. 1 and ProSieben all include telenovelas on their programme schedules.

=== Indonesia ===
In Indonesia, a similar format exists called the sinetron (a portmanteau of sine, short for cinema and tron, from "electronic"), which are essentially soap operas in a miniseries-style format. While most English-language soap operas can continue indefinitely, almost all Sinetrons have a predetermined duration, usually running for only five-, six- or seven days a week and in total for more than five months.

Sinetrons are usually made by production companies such as SinemArt and MD Entertainment. These programmes are usually broadcast on national television networks during the country's designated primetime period (6.00 to 11.00 pm), often a priority since these programme earn significant ratings, attracting advertisers.

=== Malaysia ===
In Malaysia, the equivalent of telenovela for a local language drama is drama rantaian. The drama may last for 13 episodes for a weekly drama and more than 15 episodes if broadcast by a daily basis, usually three to five days a week.

However, since almost all television broadcasters that air domestically produced dramas also air foreign dramas, Malaysian television dramas are less prolific compared to Indonesian, Philippine, South Korean or Turkish dramas.

=== Mexico ===
Mexico was one of the first countries in the world to become known for producing telenovelas aimed at shaping social behavior – one issue of which is family planning during the 1970s. The Mexican model of telenovelas – quick to be replicated by other telenovela-producing countries in Latin America and Asia for most of the 1990s – usually involves a romantic couple that encounters many problems throughout the show's run including a villain. One common ending archetype consists of a wedding and the villain dying, going to jail, becoming permanently injured or disabled, or losing their mind. The use of sexually themed episodes starring the leading couple of the story has been a common element through most Mexican (and Latin American) telenovelas.

Televisa and TV Azteca are the largest producers and exporters of Mexican telenovelas. Their main competitor is independent company Argos Comunicación. Telenovelas produced by U.S.-based network Telemundo tend to follow the Mexican model. Previously, telenovelas were often thought to be used as a government tool to distract citizens from national issues, a reason cited for temporary decrease in their credibility and popular appeal. Nowadays, Mexican television has managed to counteract government influence in its telenovelas. In particular, around 1990, Televisa found an enormous market for its telenovelas in regions such as Brazil and parts of Latin America, post-Cold War Eastern Europe and Asia. This precipitated the so-called 'Telenovela Craze'. Credited by media experts to Televisa's move in the early 1990s of exporting its telenovelas, it rivalled the wave of American sitcoms that were broadcast worldwide in the same period.

During the peak of the global success of Latin American telenovelas in the 1990s and 2000s, several prominent Mexican actors and actresses gained huge following for the telenovelas that they starred in. For example, Verónica Castro's international fame grew when the novela she had starred in many years earlier, Los Ricos También Lloran in 1979, became a major hit in Russia. In the same period, Thalía earned the title as the "Queen of Soap Operas" after starring in the so-called Las Tres Marias or the "Maria Trilogy" telenovelas – Maria Mercedes, Marimar and Maria la del Barrio – and Rosalinda, converting her into one of the world's foremost television icons, as her telenovelas were broadcast in Mexico and more than 180 other countries to almost 2 billion viewers worldwide, earning the all-time highest television ratings both in Mexico and other regions.

Due to the international success of the telenovelas broadcast in and out of Mexico, by the late 1990s, it was claimed that telenovelas were Mexico's leading export product. Many consider the period from 1958 to 2004 to be Televisa's Golden Age of telenovelas. At the same time the Mexican government loosened its control over television. Telenovelas, primarily those produced by Argos Comunicación, consequently addressed new themes, including poverty, political corruption, immigration and drug smuggling. However, with American drama and comedy series becoming increasingly popular among Mexican audiences through cable or satellite television and unlicensed copying, the television companies opted to adapt stories from Argentina, Colombia and Brazil. These used veteran actors in order to decrease expenses.

Currently, the most successful telenovelas are being created by Argos and Telemundo and are rebroadcast (or adapted) by the main companies. The most successful one, La Reina del Sur, based on the book by Arturo Perez Reverte, is based on the true story of a female drug trafficker in Sinaloa. Though it was censored somewhat due to the Drug War and was broadcast on a low-rated channel, it achieved higher viewership than other programs in the same timeframe.

=== Peru ===
Peruvian telenovelas, like other telenovelas, revolve around the character's personal lives. There are usually slight touches of comedy, drama and suspense. Al Fondo Hay Sitio has become one of the most famous telenovelas of Peru and has been shown around South America in Ecuador, Bolivia, Paraguay, Uruguay and Chile

=== Philippines ===
Domestically produced telenovelas first appeared on Philippine television in the 1960s, beginning with the ABS-CBN program Hiwaga sa Bahay na Bato. The format of Philippine telenovelas is almost the same as Spanish and Mexican telenovelas, as they have borrowed many elements including many clichés. However, Philippine telenovelas, which portray the reality of Filipino (as well as much of other Asian) societies, have evolved through decades and feature specific characteristics distinct from most of the world's telenovelas.

The late 1980s and 1990s coincided with the end of martial law and the resulting expansion of commercial television networks as the Philippine government loosened controls over the press and media. With the help of simultaneous nationwide programming across the Philippines and the advent of the "telenovela craze" precipitated by Mexican telenovelas broadcast worldwide, previously dominant Filipino sitcoms had been largely replaced by domestically produced drama series airing on primetime television to encourage more competition among networks and reach out to more audiences across the nation. Examples of such classic telenovelas include Flordeluna, Villa Quintana, Mara Clara, Esperanza, Valiente, Kung Mawawala Ka, Mula sa Puso and Sa Dulo ng Walang Hanggan.

Modern Philippine television dramas are usually termed teleserye, a portmanteau of the Filipino words "telebisyon" ("television") and "serye" ("series"). The term "teleserye" originated in the 2000s from the ABS-CBN-produced Pangako Sa 'Yo, dubbed by the Philippine media as the first true teleserye as well as the most widely exported and most watched single Philippine television series abroad. In the 21st century, teleseryes may belong to one or several genres such as fantasy, suspense, action, or comedy, but featured several new variations from the previous Philippine telenovelas of the preceding century. In 1997–2004, the International Channel from comcast aired Telenovelas such as Pangako Sa 'Yo, Basta't Kasama Kita, Mula sa Puso, Recuerdo de Amor, Saan Ka Man Naroroon, and Flames on its international simulcast. The last series to air on its AZN network were Krystala and Marina.

=== Portugal ===
The first Portuguese telenovela was Vila Faia, in 1982. Throughout the 1980s and 1990s, almost all Portuguese telenovelas were broadcast by RTP. However, since the start of the 21st century, TVI has emerged as the most prolific broadcaster of Portuguese telenovelas. Morangos com Açúcar, one of its most successful telenovelas, lasted for nine seasons. SIC, which usually imported telenovelas from Brazil's Rede Globo, has also started to produce its own telenovelas. Portuguese telenovelas have since exceeded telenovelas from neighboring Spain in terms of international popularity by the 2010s. In 2010, Portugal won the first Emmy for a Telenovela, with Meu Amor ("My Love"). In 2011, Portugal won its second consecutive International Emmy for a Telenovela with Laços de Sangue ("Blood Ties"). Portugal also sells telenovelas to Eastern Europe and America.

=== Russia ===
Telenovelas were first introduced to Soviet viewers in 1988, when a stripped-down version of Escrava Isaura (running only 15 episodes) was shown on central television channel. The adaptation of that series was very popular with the Soviet viewers. An even bigger success was Los Ricos También Lloran, shown shortly afterwards. After the collapse of the Soviet Union in 1991, Russian TV channels commenced broadcasting telenovelas (usually those imported from Brazil) on a regular basis. Today, Latin American telenovelas are usually replaced by Russian-made alternatives.

=== Serbia ===
The first Serbian telenovela was made in 2004 by BK TV and its name is Jelena. After that RTV Pink made Ljubav i mržnja (2007–2008). AVA Film (branch office of Croatian AVA Production) made Zaustavi vreme 2008, but it wasn't aired. A Serbian version of Graduados, Istine i laži, was made by Prva Srpska Televizija and Smart Media Production. It currently airs on Prva Srpska Televizija.

=== South Africa ===
The first telenovela in South Africa was Inkaba, which was aired on Mzansi Magic. Inkaba was canceled after it flopped to lure in viewers. Isibaya was the first ever successful telenovela on the channel of Mzansi Magic.

The most successful South African telenovela is Uzalo. Uzalo has over 10.25 million viewers in South Africa. Uzalo tells the story of two families in the township of Kwa-Mashu: the Mdletshe family which plays a significant role in the management of the Kwamashu Kingdom Church and the Xulu family which runs a car theft syndicate. The connection between the families is that their eldest sons were switched at birth during the period when Nelson Mandela was released from prison. Uzalo details the relationships and conflict between members of the two families as part of a complex story.

Following the trend, other telenovelas started to flood in, with Mzansi Magic holding the monopoly of the genre with shows like Isithembiso, The Queen and The River among others. Other channels, such as e.tv and SABC, launched productions such as Keeping Score, Giyani: Land of Blood, High Rollers, Ashes To Ashes, Gold Diggers and Broken Vows.

=== South Korea ===
Korean telenovelas are often similar to a soap opera but without a neverending plot and frank sexual content. These dramas typically involve conflicts around dating and marital relationships, money problems, relationships between family members and in-laws (usually between the mother-in-law and daughter-in-law), and often complicated love triangles. The heroine usually falls in love with the main character who may treat her badly for a while unlike the person who always cares for her. Korean telenovelas tend to run for 100+ episodes (rarely exceeding 200) and air from Monday to Friday. The main broadcasters and producers are KBS, MBC and SBS.

South Korea became one of the world's largest Asian-based television drama producers at the start of the 21st century. Korean dramas have been exported globally and have contributed to the Korean Wave phenomenon known as Hallyu.

=== Spain ===
Spanish telenovelas are known in the nation as culebrones (Spanish of "long snakes") because of their convoluted plots. Broadcasters of telenovelas in the country are Telecinco, Antena3, and La 1; there are regional telenovelas produced in Basque and Catalan languages. They are produced by EITB (in Basque) and TV3 (in Catalan). However, Spain is not a producer of telenovelas so much as it is an importer of these programs.

Telenovelas have also aided in the formation of a transnational 'Hispanic' identity, as the Venezuelan scholar Daniel Mato has suggested. The appeal of the genre lies in the melodramatic and often simplistic narrative which can be understood and enjoyed by audiences in a wide variety of cultural contexts. Bielby and Harrington have argued that this reverse flow has influenced soap operas in the United States, leading to "genre transformation", especially with daytime soaps.

=== Thailand ===
Thailand began producing its own telenovelas, also known in Thai as Lakorn, in the 1990s at the same time as the Philippines, Turkey and South Korea began exporting their own television dramas as well in parts of Asia. The first Thai soap opera is Dao Pra Sook internationally in Cambodia, followed by Singapore with Nang Tard and Love Destiny and the Philippines with You're My Destiny. Likewise, Thai content have also gained considerable following in the Philippines, with numerous Thai series such as 2gether: The series and The Gifted regularly topping Twitter trends in the country.

=== Turkey ===
Turkey began producing its own telenovelas, also known in Turkish as televizyon dizileri, in the late 1990s at the same time that as the Philippines and South Korea began exporting their own television dramas as well in parts of the world. The storylines of Turkish dramas are usually based from the country's classic novels as well as historical settings (mostly during the Ottoman Empire period), and are known to have episodes lasting at least two hours each, much longer than an ordinary telenovela episode. These drama shows, in general, are of miniseries type, typically lasting for less than half a year, and are broadcast either as canned series or simultaneous telecasts in Turkey's key television markets with subtitles in multiple languages depending on the country outside Turkey where it has been aired.

Turkish telenovelas have gained wide popularity and appeal among viewers especially in the Arab world as well as the Balkans, Eastern Europe, Russia, and Central-South Asia due in part to the picturesque cinematography. This exportation of dramas has been cited as one of Turkey's foremost strategies in boosting their popularity in these regions by promoting Turkish culture and tourism. As a result, these make up one of its most economically and culturally important international exports.

International media experts have cited the 2010s as the biggest turning point of Turkish television production, which shifted to a balance of export of religious shows that were often widely viewed in these predominantly Muslim-majority countries (with Ramadan known to be the most lucrative month of every television season in most Islamic countries for imported Turkish television shows) and secular shows tackling national issues of Turkey and even of the rest of the Islamic world. Some of the most internationally prominent Turkish television dramas include Muhteşem Yüzyıl, Fatmagül'ün Suçu Ne?, Aşk-ı Memnu, Binbir Gece, Dolunay, and Erkenci Kuş. The rise of Turkish television drama on the international market attracted worldwide attention during this decade when it began gaining more viewers in Latin America, which is cited as a difficult market for foreign shows to be broadcast as its own produced telenovelas dominate programming there since the 1990s.

Islamic conservatives in many Arab countries, however, condemn these Turkish shows as "vulgar" and "heretical" to Islam, as most of the prominent secular Turkish television series often have political undertones as well as a noticeable trend on emphasis of female empowerment, which contrasts with their patriarchal interpretation of Islam. Nonetheless, Turkish television drama broadcasts reach 1 billion viewers from approximately 100 countries in the world, helping it surpass Latin America by the 2010s as the second largest exporter of television series worldwide after the United States.

=== United States ===
In the mainland United States, the telenovela concept has been adapted into the English language. The first American telenovela was the soap opera Port Charles (a spin-off of ABC's long-running soap General Hospital), which, although starting off as a traditional soap when it debuted in 1997, adopted a 13-week telenovela-style storyline format beginning in 2000 which continued in use until the show's cancellation in 2003.

MyNetworkTV, an upstart network launched by News Corporation (now owned by Fox Corporation) in the wake of The WB's merger with UPN to form The CW, launched on September 5, 2006; in contrast to The CW (which maintained a programming strategy similar to its precursors), the network initially focused on prime time serial dramas modelled after the telenovela format; Desire and Fashion House were moderately successful, however, ratings began to decline. The second pair of telenovelas, Wicked Wicked Games and Watch Over Me had decent ratings but were not as successful as its two predecessors. By the time the third batch of serials, American Heiress and Saints and Sinners debuted, ratings had declined significantly to where the network scaled back and eventually dropped the novela format by the fall of 2007. in favor of one based on non-scripted and acquired programming.

In Puerto Rico, the telenovela genre was historically popular and there still is some interest to this day. The serials in days past were usually broadcast on domestic television stations three days a week at 6:30pm, with hour-long telenovelas airing at 7:00 and 9:00 p.m. during prime time. Production of telenovelas in Puerto Rico began in the 1950s with "Ante la ley" in 1955. Successful novelas to have come out of Puerto Rico have included La Mujer de aquella Noche, El Hijo de Angela Maria, El Cuarto Mandamiento, Tomiko, Cristina Bazan, El Idolo, Yo Se Que Mentia, Vivir Para Ti, Tanairi, Tres Destinos and many others.

During the 1980s, Sully Diaz, Ivonne Goderich, Millie Aviles, Giselle Blondet and Von Marie Mendez were generally considered as "the five queens" of Puerto Rican telenovelas.

In contrast, telenovelas adapted into a more conventional, weekly format have been more successful, such as ABC's adaptation of Betty la Fea, Ugly Betty, the Juana la virgen adaptation Jane the Virgin on The CW, Arabic-language adaptions of telenovelas from MBC 4. including Juana la virgen (based on Jane the Virgin), Miss Farah adaptation on MBC4. NBC piloted an adaptation of the racy Colombian telenovela Sin tetas no hay paraíso called Without Breasts There Is No Paradise, however, it was never picked up to series.

In 2001, after it was purchased by NBC (which later merged with Vivendi Universal to form NBC Universal in 2003), Telemundo decided to stop importing Latin American telenovelas and produce its own. The network collaborated with RTI Colombia and Argos Comunicación to co-produce its telenovelas, which follow the Mexican model, though Telemundo is a Puerto Rican firm. In order for its telenovelas to be recognized by the U.S. and Latin American audiences and even Spanish audiences, Telemundo chose to hire established telenovela actors from Mexico, Colombia, Venezuela, Puerto Rico, and other Latin American countries; the network's novelas have since also hired American-born Hispanic actors. Telemundo's first telenovela co-productions were Amantes del Desierto (with RTI) and Cara o Cruz (with Argos) in 2001. The network also co-produced the 2002 novela Vale Todo in conjunction with Rede Globo, that series did not fare well in the ratings. In 2003, Telemundo began producing its novelas stateside in Miami, beginning with the RTI co-production Amor Descarado. Telemundo has experienced increasing success with its telenovelas, which have also been syndicated to Colombia, Venezuela, Peru, and Chile. Argos ended its co-production deal with Telemundo on December 31, 2006, with the last such co-production being Marina. Telemundo continues to co-produce telenovelas with RTI but has also started to produce these serials on its own. In 2005, the network opened Telemundo Television Studios in Miami, as a production studio for its telenovelas; Dame Chocolate also became the first telenovela to be fully produced by Telemundo. In 2006, Telemundo broadcast two telenovelas not created by the network or its partners, Amor Mío (co-produced by Televisa and Telefe) and La Esclava Isaura (produced by Rede Record).

Cisneros Media Distribution (formerly Venevisión International) has also produced American-based telenovelas, which follow the Venezuelan story pattern and aired on Telemundo competitor Univision in the U.S. (in addition to being carried by main Venevisión network in Venezuela); its telenovelas portray the lives of Venezuelan Americans in the United States. Although a Venezuelan-owned company, Cisneros Media not only hired established telenovela actors from Venezuela, but also from other Latin American countries like Mexico, Colombia, Peru, Puerto Rico, etc. like in Telemundo, in order for its telenovelas to be recognized by the U.S., Latin American, and Spanish audiences. In recent years, Univision has also begun producing its own telenovelas for its primetime schedule.

Some Spanish-language telenovelas are now translated into English. Univision and Telemundo provide closed captioning in English in order to attract English-speaking American viewers (primarily American-born Mexicans who are not fluent in Spanish), carried as the second or third caption channel depending on the station. Xenon Pictures also includes English subtitles on its DVD releases of Mexican serials. The sudden interest in English telenovelas can be attributed to the appeal and successful ratings of the genre. Producers also see this as a way to attract the fast-growing Mexican population, most notably the female sector of this demographic. In addition, telenovelas break the traditional production format in the United States, in which a television program runs for 20–25 episodes a season, on a once-weekly basis.

In the 2010s, the children's cable network Nickelodeon experimented with airing several serials in a weekday strip over a month, beginning with House of Anubis—a fantasy mysyery based on a drama produced by its Dutch counterpart. The tenth season of the Canadian teen drama Degrassi—which was commissioned by TeenNick—similarly shifted to a stripped format; showrunner Stephen Stohn had been pitching a telenovela-like series for the channel, and shifted the pitch into being a retooling of Degrassi after Canadian network CTV initially declined to renew the series. Nickelodeon later produced English-language adaptions of telenovelas from its Latin American arm. including Every Witch Way (based on Grachi), Talia in the Kitchen (based on Toni la chef), and I Am Frankie (based on Yo soy Franky).

=== Uruguay ===
In Uruguay, telenovelas began to be produced in the 2000s. At first, short run length productions were made that focused on melodramatic twists of traditional middle class life and were broadcast mainly on Channel 4, such as, Mañana será otro día, Constructores and Charly en el aire.

In the 2010s, productions began to have a larger budget, which led to a greater number of episodes and even the participation of foreign actors. The youth-oriented telenovela Dance! La Fuerza del Corazón was Channel 10's first major production, being syndicated in several countries in Latin America and Europe, and dubbed into Portuguese and Italian. Another well-known production of Channel 10 is Porque te quiero así, which ran from 2010 to 2011.

=== Venezuela ===
Telenovelas in Venezuela are mainly produced by RCTV, Venevisión and Televen. Like Televisa in Mexico, Venevision controls a large portion of the entertainment industry in that country. Some of Venevision's telenovelas were also broadcast on Univision in the United States until the late 2000s. Some major telenovelas produced in Venevision include Amor Comprado, Dulce Enemiga, Cara Sucia, Bellisima and Pecado de Amor.

Venezuela is one of the largest producers of telenovelas in the world, with up to 279 serials of this style have aired to date. Many of the major productions have been syndicated to Colombia, Brazil, Mexico, Peru, Ecuador, Spain, Italy, Japan, and the United States, among other countries.

In the beginning, Venezuelan telenovelas followed the telenovela rosa format of a poor Cinderella who falls in love with Prince charming. Later in the 1980s, writers began writing realistic telenovelas that reflected everyday life of the common citizens where the audience could relate with the characters with telenovelas such as El sol sale para todos, Natalia de 8 a 9 and La señora de Cárdenas. The most famous of such telenovelas was Por estás calles which ran from 1992 to 1994. Another popular telenovela genre was the mystery telenovela which involved a serial killer with telenovelas such as Angélica Pecado, La Mujer de Judas and La viuda joven which became successful during their original run and were sold to several countries around the world.

In recent years, telenovela production has declined in the country especially after the closure of RCTV which was a major telenovela producer and exporter. Channels such as Venevisión end up producing only one national production per year. Government sanctions and regulations on media content has led to self-censorship of telenovela writers, also leading to reduced telenovela production.

== Awards ==
The most important Telenovela award shows are the Mexican TVyNovelas Award, hosted by the Televisa-owned TVyNovelas magazine, and the award presented by Contigo in Brazil. TVyNovelas also has editions in Colombia, Chile, Puerto Rico, and the United States, while Contigo has an edition in Chile. In 2008, International Academy of Television Arts and Sciences (IATAS) created a new International Emmy Award category for telenovelas produced and initially aired outside of the United States.

== Comparison with soap operas ==
The standard American, British or Australian soap opera is of indefinite length, sometimes running for decades, with an ever-rotating cast of players and characters. However, most Latin American telenovelas have an average run of six months up to a year. The show's duration is pre-planned at the show's inception, with the overall story arc and conclusion also known by the show's creators and producers at its inception. Mundo de Juguete is one exception to the rule, with a total of 605 episodes (1974–1977), and a few cast changes during the course of the serial. Some earlier Argentine telenovelas (most of them written by Alberto Migré) had also run for a few years.

Telenovelas also have a different type of story from English-language soaps, the typical telenovela story being focused on a rivalry between two or more people or families in romance or business. Many of them use stock themes like a Cinderella (who is a rival of the male protagonist's evil girlfriend), two brothers after one woman (or two sisters after one man) or mistaken/unknown parentage. Typically, the hero gets shot (or some form of fate equivalent to that).

Telenovelas comprise the great majority of the dramatic productions by South American television networks, whereas in the United States, other formats like sitcoms or drama series are more popular on English language networks.

== See also ==
- Fantaserye – a genre of teleserye
- Fotonovela – the magazine equivalent, a sort of photo-comic book usually with a romantic theme.
- Hong Kong television drama
- List of telenovelas
- Limited-run series
- MyNetworkTV telenovelas
- Serial (radio and television) – for a general discussion of the serial format, including soap operas and telenovelas
- Taiwanese Drama
- Teleserye
- Korean drama
- Indian soap opera
- Japanese television drama
  - Asadora
- Téléroman – the French-Canadian equivalent
- Thai television soap opera
- Turkish television drama
- Webnovela – movement on the Internet, which is equivalent to the simulation of telenovelas.
