= Bojana Ordinačev =

Serbian model and actress

- Born: Bojana Laura Ordinačev; August 14, 1980 (age 45); Novi Sad, SR Serbia, SFR Yugoslavia
- Years active: 2003–present

Bojana Laura Ordinačev (born August 14, 1980, in Novi Sad, Serbia, SFR Yugoslavia) is a Serbian model and actress who made her debut in 2003 television series M(j)ešoviti brak. She also portrayed in Serbian telenovelas like Jelena (2004) and Ne daj se, Nina (2007), Serbo-Croatian version of Ugly Betty. She lives and works in Belgrade.

== Filmography ==
=== Television ===
- M(j)ešoviti brak (2003) as Sandra
- Jelena (2004) as Helen Despotović Milijaš
- Caravaggio (2007) as Anna Bianchini
- Ne daj se, Nina (2007–present) as Patricija Vučković
- Zakon ljubavi (2008–present) as Iris
- Istine i laži (2017–present) as Kristina Kris Bajčetić
