= RTV BK Telecom =

Serbian broadcast network

- Type: Television network
- Country: Serbia
- Availability: Private television
- Market share: 11.2% (2005)
- Owner: Bogoljub Karić
- Key people: Aleksandar Tijanić (1994–1996); Milomir Marić (2001–2004); Bojana Lekić (2004–2006)
- Launch date: 5 December 1994; 30 years ago 11 October 2017 (relaunch of channel airing archives)
- Dissolved: 9 March 2007 (terrestrial broadcasting stopped 25 April 2006); 1 October 2020 (channel airing archives)

RTV BK Telekom (Serbian Cyrillic: Радио Телевизија Браћа Карић Телеком) was a privately owned radio and television company based in Belgrade, Serbia. It functioned as a revenue-generating media outlet with a "G" rating (general audiences or general interest station) and without editorial or content restrictions. It was launched two and a half months following the launch of RTV Pink.

Prior to its license revocation in late April 2006 and subsequent folding during March 2007, BKTV had significant viewership all over Serbia. According to Nielsen Research data for the calendar year 2005 (its last full year of regular terrestrial broadcasting), BKTV held 11.2% of the Serbian TV audience with a daily average of 3.2 million people tuning into its programmes, which meant it was the third most watched TV network in Serbia at the time behind Pink (22.5% market share and 3.7 million daily viewers on average) and RTS 1 (Serbian TV channel) (22.4% market share and 3.9 million daily viewers on average). BK was well ahead of fourth placed B92 (6.8%) and fifth placed RTS 2 (6.3%).

The station's most watched programme ever was the live broadcast of Slobodan Milošević's funeral on 18 March 2006 when 2,688,622 viewers (25.2% of the Serbian television market) tuned into BK.

== History ==
The company started broadcasting a TV signal on 5 December 1994.

As of April 2004, BKTV covered more than 90% of the territory and reached about 90% of the entire population.

It aired the Serbian versions of the Who Wants to Be a Millionaire? quiz (Želite li da postanete milioner?), The Weakest Link (Najslabija karika), as well as two seasons of the local Idol series – Idol.

Additionally, during the 2000s, the network started producing its own comedy, drama, and soap-opera content such as Crni Gruja (historical comedy), and Jelena (soap).

Telefakt, BKTV's main news programme was shown several times a day, while a shorter news bulletin programme Naslovi ran every hour on the hour. BKTV's morning show was named Budilnik.

BKTV also bought rights for 2006 FIFA World Cup in Germany, but had to forfeit them because a month before the competition was to start, the station's licence got revoked. The rights were then bought out by public broadcaster RTS.

RTV BK Telecom was on the cusp of new technologies. It was the first TV station in Serbia to start broadcasting on the internet by making selected news programmes available for download and streaming on their website. It eventually introduced the BK Player, a media player designed to play BK TV program live on the Internet 24 hours a day. The latest version was BK Player 2.

On 11 October 2017, a channel named BK (using the same 1994 logo) launched on a cable operator. However, this channel broadcasts some of archived content the original channel has aired. This channel later shut down on 1 October 2020, after the channel failed to gain an allocated broadcasting frequency in late November the previous year.

=== License revocation and shutdown ===
On 25 April 2006, the Serbian state agency for airwaves control (Republička radiodifuzna agencija) decided to revoke BKTV's broadcasting license for 30 days. The reason given was "violation of broadcasting regulations". Shortly after midnight on 26 April, BKTV's physical location was raided by the police and the station ceased broadcasts. Around 11 a.m. the same day, most of the cable operators stopped carrying the station. It nevertheless continued to broadcast via satellite, and television sets have been set out televising the channel in Knez Mihailova Street in Belgrade for passers-by to watch.

May 2006 allocations of broadcasting frequencies by the Republican Broadcasting Agency's (RBA) of Serbia sparked a national controversy, and many called foul play. RBA did not award a frequency to several companies, including RTV BK Telecom. The company's bank accounts were blocked and BKTV had been taken off the air terrestrially.

BKTV commenced transmission over satellite with stripped down programming consisting mostly of SMS messages and music videos. Throughout 2006, most of BKTV's staff and on-air personalities left. The station eventually folded for good on 9 March 2007 at 7 pm.

=== Broadcast on the Internet ===
On 5 December 2011, date picked symbolically as the 17th anniversary of the station's establishment, BK television partially returned by starting to broadcast over the Internet via a YouTube channel named BKTVnews. The channel's name has since been modified to BK Telefakt.

As of March 2015, the channel was still active, putting out a daily 10-minute newscast.

== Channels ==
Budilnik, BKTV's morning programme from July 2005

- BKTV (BK 063) – terrestrial channel
- BK Sat – Available in the United States via Dish Network, Canada via Intelsat Americas 5 satellite, Australia via TV Plus, and Europe via Hot Bird 3, Atlantic Bird 2, and Euroasiasat 1 satellites. (BKTV Sat is broadcasting FTA (unencrypted) via Hot Bird)
- DTV (Dečija Televizija, in English: Kids TV); this channel was originally called Eksperimentalni (Experimental) and was the first channel oriented towards kids in Eastern Europe.
- BKTVnews broadcast over the internet on YouTube channel called BKTVnews.
