= Husein Mujić =

6th Grand Mufti of Yugoslavia from 1987 to 1989

Hafiz Husein Mujić
- Title: 6th Grand Mufti of Yugoslavia

Personal life
- Born: 1918 Orahovica Gornja, Condominium of Bosnia and Herzegovina, Austria-Hungary
- Died: 27 December 1993 (aged 74–75) Tuzla, Bosnia and Herzegovina
- Resting place: Kalebići Cemetery, Tuzla
- Occupation: imam; journalist; grand mufti

Religious life
- Religion: Sunni Islam

Senior posting
- Period in office: 1987 – 1989
- Predecessor: Naim Hadžiabdić
- Successor: Jakub Selimoski

hfz Husein ef. Mujić (1918 – 27 December 1993) was a Bosnian cleric who served as the Grand Mufti of Yugoslavia from 1987 to 1989.

== Biography ==
Mujić was born in 1918 in Orahovica Gornja near Gračanica. He completed Osman-kaptan Madrasa in Gračanica and Behram-Bey's Madrasa in Tuzla. While studying in Tuzla, he also completed his hifz (memorization) under the hafiz Ahmed Redžebašić in 1936. In 1980, he completed his studies in Arabic language and literature at the Faculty of Philology of the University of Belgrade.

Mujić worked in the Islamic community since 1938, first as an imam and religious teacher in Zvornik, then in Zelinja Srednja near Gradačac, then in Gračanica. In 1960, he was elected chief imam of the region of Tuzla, and 15 years later he became the mufti of that region. From that position he was elected Grand Mufti, and the menšura was handed over to him, according to his wish, on 11 December 1987, in Belgrade's Bajrakli Mosque.

Pressured by events in the Islamic Community, Mujić resigned from the position of Grand Mufti after two years, at the end of 1989. He was a regular member of both the republican and federal bodies of the Islamic Community, an active participant in the People's Front and the Socialist Alliance. Also, for several years he was president of the Association of Ilmija and for three years editor-in-chief of Preporod, the then journal of this association.

Religious titles
Preceded by Naim Hadžiabdić	6th Grand Mufti of Yugoslavia; 1987–1989	Succeeded by Jakub Selimoski
