= Muhamed Šefket Kurt =

Bosnian cleric (1879-1963)

Effendi Muhamed Šefket Kurt
- Born: 1879; Travnik, Austro-Hungarian Empire
- Died: 21 June 1963 (aged 84); Tuzla, Bosnia and Herzegovina, Yugoslavia
- Occupations: Imam; khatib; mufti

Muhamed Šefket ef. Kurt (1879 – 21 June 1963) was a Bosnian cleric, mufti of the cities of Banja Luka and Tuzla. He is credited with saving the lives of hundreds of Serbs in Tuzla during World War II.

== Biography ==
Muhamed Šefket Kurt was born in Travnik, Bosnia and Herzegovina, then a part the Austro-Hungarian Empire in 1879 to ethnic Bosniak parents.

Kurt finished the mekteb and began studying in the madrasa in front of his father Fadil (1845–1893). When his father, died 14 year old Muhamed Šefket went from Travnik to Mostar to his paternal grandfather Ahmet Kurt, an Islamic theologian, where he finished his education and listened to lectures by the famous Mostar scholar Ali Fehmi ef. Džabić. In 1895, after the death of his grandfather Ahmet, he went to Sarajevo and enrolled in the Kuršumlija Madrasa, from which he went to study in Istanbul a year later. He studied there for a full ten years and went to Damascus for the purpose of learning the Arabic language. Upon his return to Bosnia and Herzegovina in 1908, he was appointed imam and hatib of Hajji Ali-beg's mosque and muderis of his madrasa in Travnik.

He lived with his family in Travnik until 1914 when he moved to Banja Luka in 1914, where he was appointed mufti. He arrived in Tuzla in 1925 and remained mufti until 1933, when he was elected a member of the Ulema Majlis in Sarajevo. He retired in 1936.

== World War II ==
At the beginning of World War II in April 1941, 108 of the most prominent Sarajevo Bosniaks adopted a resolution stating the difficult situation and persecution of the Serb population and demanding that it be stopped. Similar resolutions were passed in Banja Luka, Prijedor and Bijeljina. In Mostar such a resolution was won on 21 October 1941. On 11 December 1941, the Tuzla Resolution was passed. Her original text was written in an extremely sharp tone, so it was decided not to send the text, but to send a delegation of eleven Bosniaks and three Croats to Zagreb and to verbally protest in the government of the Axis-aligned Independent State of Croatia over the crime. The resolutions themselves did not achieve much success, and persecutions, killings and torture continued.

On Orthodox Christmas Eve, 6 January 1942, Ustaša authorities in occupied Tuzla intended to demolish the Church of the Dormition of the Theotokos. Along with the demolition of the Tuzla Orthodox Church, the Ustašas intended to carry out a mass execution of Serb civilians on Christmas Eve.

This information was heard by the mufti of Tuzla Muhamed Šefket ef. Kurt, who with a group of prominent residents of city, requested an urgent meeting with the German commander of the Tuzla and energetically demanded that he prevent the crime. When the Germans heard of the extent of Bosniak opposition to such actions, they issued a written order prohibiting the Ustašas from taking any retaliatory measures without they approval.

In an effort to strengthen the demarche with the German commander, mufti and a group of prominent Tuzla residents went to Zagreb and asked to be received by Ante Pavelić. He did not do so, but they were received by Andrija Artuković, from whom the delegation asked that the Ustašas not harm the Serbs of Tuzla. Thanks to mufti Kurt's involvement, there were no mass crimes in this city.

== Personal life ==
Kurt married Arifa (née' Turalić; 1883–1959) from Tešanj and they had eight children together. Two of their sons were killed while fighting with the Yugoslav Partisans in the World War II and a third son was killed by the Partisans near the end of the war out of unknown reasons. A fourth son was declared an "enemy of the people" by the new communist government of the Yugoslavia and imprisoned for 20 years.

Political offices
Preceded by -	Mufti of Banja Luka; 1914–1925	Succeeded by Ibrahim Maglajlić
Preceded by -	Mufti of Tuzla; 1925–1933	Succeeded by
