= Naim Hadžiabdić =

5th Grand Mufti of Yugoslavia from 1975 to 1987

Effendi Naim Hadžiabdić
- Title: 5th Grand Mufti of Yugoslavia

Personal life
- Born: 1918 Prusac, Condominium of Bosnia and Herzegovina, Austria-Hungary
- Died: 3 July 1987 (aged 68–69) Sarajevo, SR Bosnia and Herzegovina, SFR Yugoslavia
- Resting place: Gazi Husrev-beg Mosque, Sarajevo
- Occupation: imam; grand mufti

Religious life
- Religion: Sunni Islam

Senior posting
- Period in office: 18 May 1975 – 3 July 1987
- Predecessor: Sulejman Kemura
- Successor: Husein Mujić

Naim ef. Hadžiabdić (1918 – 3 July 1987) was a Bosnian cleric who served as the Grand Mufti of Yugoslavia from 1975 to 1987.

== Biography ==
Hadžiabdić was born in Prusac on 18 May 1918. He received primary religious education in hometown and completed primary school in Donji Vakuf. After graduating from the Gazi Husrev Bey's Madrasa in Sarajevo, he continued his education at the Higher Islamic Theological School. After completing his education, he entered the service of the Islamic Community, as a congregational imam in Donji Vakuf, where he remained for fifteen years. After that, he was appointed the chief imam of the Bugojno and Travnik districts. In 1963 he was elected president of the Board of Elders of the Islamic Community in Bosnia and Herzegovina, a position he held until 1975.

With Grand Mufti Sulejman Kemura, he participated in the restoration of Đulaga's castle in Sarajevo for the needs of Gazi Husrev Bey's Madrasa and the establishment of the Islamic Theological Faculty in Sarajevo. After the death of Kemura, he was first elected as acting Grand Mufti and then, at the session in Belgrade, on 22 March 1975, as the only candidate for the supreme head of the Islamic Community of Yugoslavia. The ceremonial enthronement and handing over of the menšura took place on 18 May 1975 in the Gazi Husrev Bey Mosque in Sarajevo. Hadžiabdić was the head of the Islamic community of Yugoslavia for 12 years. During his time, the Faculty of Islamic Theology was opened in Sarajevo, Isa Bey's Madrasa was opened in Skopje, and construction of the Zagreb Mosque was started.

Hadžiabdić died on 3 July 1987. He was buried three days later in the harem of the Gazi Husrev-beg Mosque in Sarajevo, next to his predecessor Sulejman Kemura.

== Works ==
Hadžiabdić wrote of the Ilmihal: za treći stupanj vjerske pouke, a religious textbook that was used in mektebs in Bosnia and Herzegovina for decades. It was first printed in Sarajevo in 1973. It has gone through more than 20 editions.

Religious titles
Preceded by Sulejman Kemura	5th Grand Mufti of Yugoslavia; 1975–1987	Succeeded by Husein Mujić
