= Sulejman Kemura =

8th Grand Mufti of Yugoslavia from 1957 to 1975

Effendi Sulejman Kemura
- Title: 4th Grand Mufti of Yugoslavia

Personal life
- Born: 1908 Sarajevo, Condominium of Bosnia and Herzegovina, Austria-Hungary
- Died: 19 January 1975 (aged 66–67) Sarajevo, SR Bosnia and Herzegovina, SFR Yugoslavia
- Resting place: Gazi Husrev-beg Mosque, Sarajevo
- Occupation: Principal; qadi; grand mufti

Religious life
- Religion: Sunni Islam

Senior posting
- Period in office: 8 December 1957 – 19 January 1975
- Predecessor: Ibrahim Fejić
- Successor: Naim Hadžiabdić

Sulejman ef. Kemura (1908 – 19 January 1975) was a Bosnian cleric who served as the Grand Mufti of Yugoslavia from 1957 to 1975.

== Biography ==
Kemura was born in Sarajevo in 1908. After finishing the mekteb and ruždija, he continued his education at Gazi Husrev Bey's Madrasa in Sarajevo. At the beginning of 1925 he enrolled at the Sharia Judge School, from which he graduated in 1930. He served at the sharia courts in Foča and Konjic. In Foča, he is involved in the work of the Gajret, and also works to suppress illiteracy among Bosniaks. Soon, at the suggestion of the Ulema Majlis, the then Grand Mufti appointed him as the secretary of the Mufti in Mostar, where in addition to that duty he also teaches religious education at the Mostar high school and teachers' school.

After the abolition of district muftiships, Kemura is from Mostar moved to Sarajevo. To the position of educational officer of the Ulema Majlis, then to the Waqf Directorate, first in the capacity of religious and educational officer, and then director of this significant institution. In 1949, the Riyasat of Yugoslavia entrusted him with the duties of director of the Gazi Husrev Bey's Madrasa in Sarajevo and editor of Glasnik, and with the establishment of Ilmijja association in 1950, he was elected secretary, so he performed these duties simultaneously.

After the retirement of Ibrahim Fejić, the Electoral Body for the Grand Mufti Election elected him as the Grand Mufti of the Islamic Community on 15 November 1957. The ceremonial enthronement and handing over of the menšura took place on 8 December 1957 in the Gazi Husrev-beg Mosque in Sarajevo. Entering this position during a period of difficulties for the Islamic community: confiscated waqf property, closed schools and numerous demolished or damaged mosques, Kemura will remain in this position until his death (18 years).

After a short illness, Kemura died on 19 January 1975. He was buried in the yard of the Gazi Husrev-beg Mosque in Sarajevo next to the grave of Fehim Spaho.

Religious titles
Preceded by Ibrahim Fejić	4th Grand Mufti of Yugoslavia; 1957–1975	Succeeded by Naim Hadžiabdić
