= Jakub Selimoski =

7th Grand Mufti of Yugoslavia from 1991 to 1993

Effendi Jakub Selimoski
- Title: 7th Grand Mufti of Yugoslavia

Personal life
- Born: 1946 Kičevo, PR Macedonia, FPR Yugoslavia
- Died: 29 March 2013 (aged 66–67) Istanbul, Turkey
- Occupation: imam; grand mufti

Religious life
- Religion: Sunni Islam

Senior posting
- Period in office: 9 March 1991 – April 1993
- Predecessor: Husein Mujić
- Successor: Mustafa Cerić (as Grand Mufti of Bosnia and Herzegovina)

Jakub ef. Selimoski (1946 – 29 March 2013) was a Macedonian cleric who served as the last Grand Mufti of Yugoslavia from 1991 to 1993.

== Biography ==
Born in Kičevo in 1946, Selimoski graduated from the Gazi Husrev Bey's Madrasa in Sarajevo in 1966. After graduating, he enrolled at the Faculty of Philology - Department of Oriental Studies in Belgrade. He later continued his studies at the Department of Civilization and Culture of Al-Azhar University in Cairo, which he finished in 1972. Upon his return to the Islamic Community of Macedonia, he was appointed as a religious and educational officer, and a little later as the secretary of the Board of Elders of the Islamic Community in Macedonia.

After the death of Bedri Hamid, the former president of the Bord of Elders of the Islamic Community in Macedonia, Selimoski was appointed acting president, and then the Supreme Assembly of the Islamic Community of Yugoslavia appointed him president of the Bord of Elders of the Islamic Community in Macedonia in 1981. His readiness and organizational skills resulted in the construction and opening of Isa Bey's Madrasa in Skopje, the construction and renovation of numerous mosques, the launch of publishing activities and the first religious newsletter after the World War II in Macedonia, El-Hilal, and the improvement of religious education.

At the beginning of 1990, Selimovski was appointed acting Grand Mufti. A year later, on 9 March 1991, by secret ballot at the session of the Electoral Body for the election of Grand Mufti in Sarajevo, he won among four candidates. His election is considered to be the first free, democratic election of Grand Mufti since World War II. He held the function of Grand Mufti until the formation of the Renewal Assembly for the Islamic Community of Bosnia and Herzegovina.

Religious titles
Preceded by Husein Mujić	7th Grand Mufti of Yugoslavia; 1991–1993	Succeeded by Mustafa Cerić as Grand Mufti of Bosnia and Herzegovina
