= Ibrahim Fejić =

3rd Grand Mufti of Yugoslavia from 1947 to 1957

Effendi Ibrahim Fejić
- Title: 3rd Grand Mufti of Yugoslavia

Personal life
- Born: 1879 Mostar, Bosnia and Herzegovina, Austria-Hungary
- Died: 15 December 1962 (aged 82–83) Sarajevo, PR Bosnia and Herzegovina, FPR Yugoslavia
- Resting place: Grličića Brdo Cemetery, Sarajevo

Religious life
- Religion: Sunni Islam

Senior posting
- Period in office: 12 September 1947 – 8 December 1957
- Predecessor: Fehim Spaho
- Successor: Sulejman Kemura

7th Mayor of Mostar
- In office 1929–1934
- Preceded by: Smail-aga Ćemalović
- Succeeded by: Muhamed Ridžanović

Ibrahim ef. Fejić (1879 – 15 December 1962) was a Bosnian cleric who served as the grand mufti of Yugoslavia from 1947 to 1957. He previously served as the mayor of Mostar from 1929 to 1934. Fejić is most remembered for his endorsement of the campaign against the mandatory veiling of Muslim women.

== Early life and career ==
Ibrahim Fejić was born in 1879 into a prominent Bosniak family in the Herzegovinian town of Mostar, then part of the Austro-Hungarian Condominium of Bosnia and Herzegovina. There he attended primary school and madrasa and received his ijazah. He was fluent in Turkish, Arabic and Persian, and had a working command of German.

Fejić functioned as theology teacher and publicist in his hometown. In 1920, he entered the ulema of the majlis in Sarajevo. In 1929, he was elected mayor of Mostar, by then part of the Kingdom of Yugoslavia. During World War II, following the Nazi occupation of Yugoslavia, Fejić stood with the Yugoslav Partisans, took an active part in the resistance movement and denounced the Holocaust and the persecution of Serbs and the Romani people.

== Religious leadership ==
The end of World War II saw the Partisans as victors in Yugoslavia. The Communist Party of Yugoslavia took power and in 1947 reached an accord with the Islamic Community, requiring the election of reformist leaders. In August, a new constitution of the Islamic Community was promulgated, with Fejić being elected the first Grand Mufti (Reis-l-ulema) in the "Second Yugoslavia" on 26 August 1947. The ceremonial inauguration took place on 12 September in Sarajevo at the Gazi Husrev-beg Mosque rather than the Emperor's Mosque, as had been traditional.

In the year of Fejić's inauguration, with the aim of accelerating the emancipation of women, the Women's Antifascist Front of Bosnia and Herzegovina launched a campaign against the wearing of hijab and niqāb (zar, the face veil). In his inaugural address, Fejić voiced his support of the campaign, stating: "One valuable legacy of the liberation war of our peoples is the proclamation of women's equality. But unfortunately women cannot achieve the full expression of that equality, as they are inhibited by wearing the veil and gown." On 1 November, the Islamic Community declared that "the veiling of women is not required by religious code. Muslim women, as regards religion, are free to walk about unveiled and tend to their affairs." In 1950, Fejić published a text in which he further explained that veiling the face was not mandated by the religion.

== Death ==
In November 1957, Fejić requested that he be relieved of his office of grand mufti of Yugoslavia. He was officially succeeded as Grand Mufti on 8 December 1957. He died on 15 December 1962, and was buried two days later in Sarajevo's Grličića Brdo Cemetery.

Political offices
Preceded by Smail-aga Ćemalović	7th Mayor of Mostar; 1929–1934	Succeeded by Muhamed Ridžanović
Religious titles
Preceded by Fehim Spaho	3rd Grand Mufti of Yugoslavia; 1947–1957	Succeeded by Sulejman Kemura
