= Zagreb Mosque =

Mosque in Zagreb, Croatia

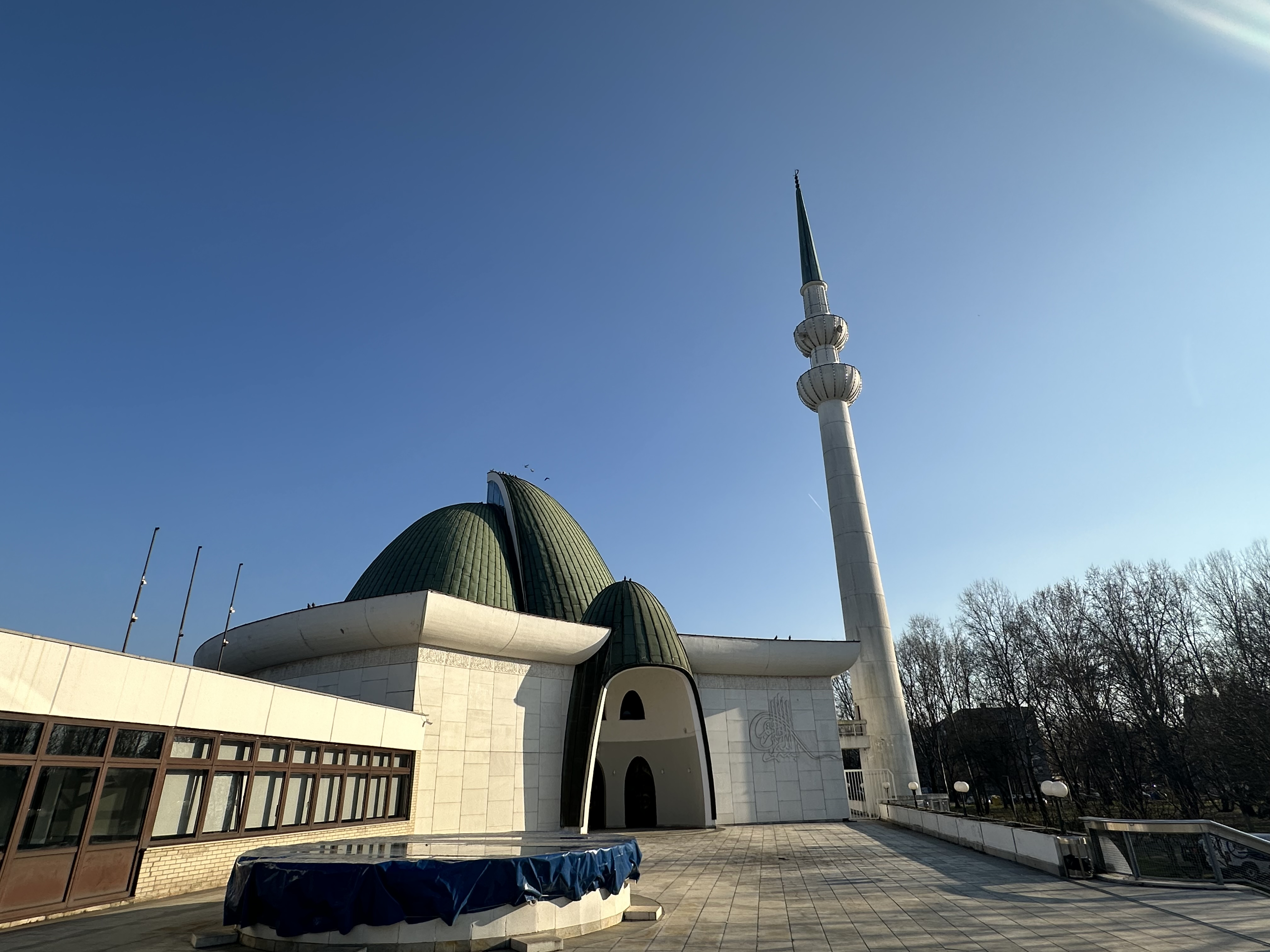
- The mosque in 2025

Religion
- Affiliation: Islam
- Ecclesiastical or organizational status: Mosque
- Status: Active

Location
- Location: Gavellina ulica 32
- Municipality: Pešćenica - Žitnjak
- State: Zagreb
- Country: Croatia
- Interactive map of Zagreb Mosque
- Coordinates: 45°47′29″N 16°00′41″E

Architecture
- Type: Islamic Architecture
- Funded by: Sultan bin Muhammad Al-Qasimi
- Groundbreaking: December 14, 1981
- Completed: September 6, 1987; 38 years ago
- Construction cost: US$2.5 million (minimum)

Specifications
- Dome: 1
- Minaret: 1
- Minaret height: 51 m (167 ft)
- Site area: 10,000 m^{2}

Website
- islamska-zajednica.hr (in Croatian)

The Zagreb Mosque is a mosque located in the city of Zagreb, Croatia. It is the largest mosque in Croatia. The Islamic Secondary School "Dr. Ahmed Smajlović" and a cultural centre operate within the mosque.

The construction began in 1981 and finished in 1987 in Borovje neighbourhood of Zagreb. Sultan bin Muhammad Al-Qasimi, the Emir of Sharjah, donated US$2.5 million for the construction of the mosque. Upon its completition in 1987 the Mosque was the biggest religious building ever built in Yugoslavia after Zagreb Cathedral. The Sultan visited the Islamic community in Zagreb in 1983.

== History ==
=== Islam in Croatia ===
The Islamic community in Croatia exists since late 19th century, and it consists predominantly of European ethnic groups—especially Albanians, Bosniaks, Romani people, and Turks — who form the majority of the country's Muslim population. Although ethnically European in composition, it is also considered part of the newer immigrant Islamic communities, as it is largely made up of immigrants and their descendants. The community was established in the late nineteenth century following the Austro-Hungarian occupation of Bosnia and Herzegovina in 1878.

Islam received official recognition within the Habsburg Monarchy in 1912 (Austrian part) and 1916 (Hungarian part), thereby extending recognition to Croatia. On 27 April 1916, the Croatian Parliament officially recognized Islam as a religion equal in status to other religions in Croatia. After 1918, Croatia became part of the Kingdom of Serbs, Croats and Slovenes (renamed the Kingdom of Yugoslavia in 1929). Economic and social factors encouraged Muslim migration to Croatia during the interwar and socialist Yugoslav periods, as well as in the period of independent Croatia.

=== First Mosque ===
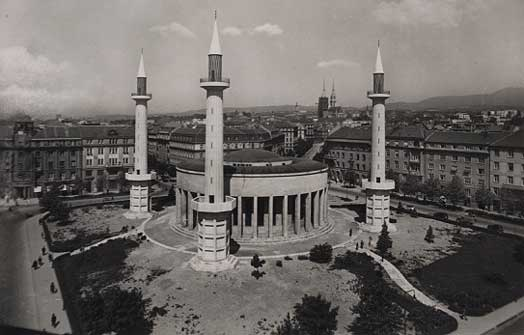
The first mosque in Zagreb, opened during World War II in 1944 in repurposed Meštrović Pavilion built between 1934 and 1938.

Following the end of the World War I and the establishment of the Kingdom of Serbs, Croats and Slovenes, plans for the construction of a mosque in Zagreb were revived. Under changed political circumstances, these plans were realized in 1944, when the reconstruction of the Meštrović Pavilion - originally built as a mausoleum for the Karađorđević dynasty was completed, minarets were added, and the first mosque in Zagreb was opened. The building is today known as the Meštrović Pavilion, located at the centre of the Square of the Victims of Fascism in Zagreb's lower town. The mosque was short-lived. It was closed in 1948 and subsequently repurposed as the Museum of the Revolution, a function the building continued to serve in the decades that followed, until turning into Art pavilion dedicated to Croatian sculptor Ivan Meštrović.

Religious activities of Muslims in Zagreb declined after the closure of the mosque and were subsequently conducted primarily within private homes and in the mesjid at Tomašićeva Street 12, which remains the seat of the Meshihat of the Islamic Community in Croatia.

=== New Mosque ===
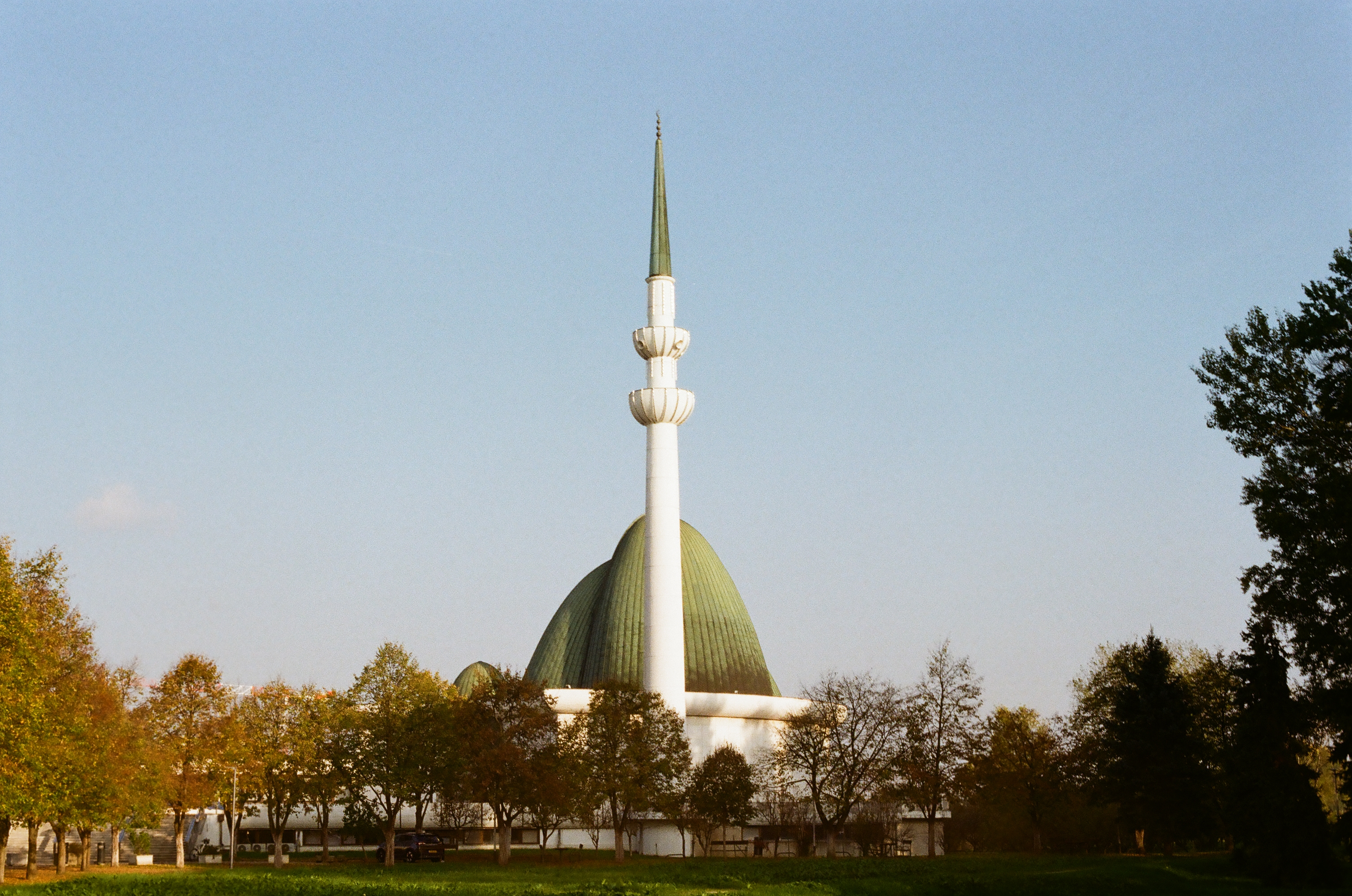
Zagreb Mosque, 2025

The initiative to construct a mosque in the mid-1960s originated with Asim Šaćiragić. According to him, during a visit to Zagreb in 1968 by the then clerk Sulejman Kemura and the President of the Supreme Assembly of the Islamic Community, Mustafa Kamarić, the city authorities offered a plot of land in the Srebrnjak area, which was subsequently accepted, until the whole process was cancelled due to political issues (led by Miko Tripalo) and the project was suspended in 1970s. Following two years, the project entered a period of inactivity. During that time, amendments to the General Urban Planning of Zagreb resulted in most of the originally allocated plot being designated for the construction of the city's northern bypass. In compensation, the city granted a plot located opposite the remaining portion of the original site; however, this arrangement left the two parcels situated in different municipal jurisdictions.

During the 1970s, several alternative sites were proposed for the future mosque in Zagreb. These included Sloboština, the area between Maksimir Stadium and the Kraš factory, and the vicinity of the Folnegovićevo naselje (the Trstik/Borovje area). Ultimately, the last location was chosen for construction, as in 1977 a plot of 17,938 m^{2} was allocated for this purpose. The whole project was financed by Sultan bin Muhammad Al-Qasimi, who donated donated US$2.5 million

The new Zagreb Mosque in Borovje was designed by the architects Džemal Čelić and Mirza Gološ from Sarajevo. The foundation stone was laid on 11 September 1981, and construction began on 14 December of the same year. The building works were carried out by the construction company Tehnika. The official opening ceremony was held over several days, from 3 to 6 September 1987, culminating in a gathering of nearly 70,000 people. At the time, it was the largest religious building ever constructed in the former Yugoslavia, after Zagreb Cathedral.

The architectural complex covers an area of approximately 10,000 square metres and consists of several functional units, including a mosque with a minaret approximately 51 metres high, an Islamic secondary school (Islamic Secondary School "Dr. Ahmed Smajlović"), a library, community facilities, administrative offices, residential quarters, and service areas. While preserving traditional spatial organization and religious functions in both its interior and exterior design, the architecture of the complex is aligned with contemporary construction trends. The calligraphic decoration was created by Ešref Kovačević, at the time one of the most prominent Bosnian calligraphers.

== Interior ==
The interior elements follow traditional functions, reinterpreted in a modern, dynamic form. The mihrab, traditionally a niche indicating the direction of the Kaaba in Mecca where the imam leads prayer, is here designed as a parabolic projection emerging from the wall, with the niche inscribed within it. The mihrab is adorned with calligraphy along the niche's edge, featuring Ayat al-Kursi (Quran 2:255), which praises God's continuous creation. The calligraphy is rendered in the geometric Naskh script, standardized for unambiguous Quranic transcription. Inside the niche, the Qur’an instructs worshippers to face the sacred mosque in Mecca. Two medallions bearing the name Allah flank the mihrab. By avoiding the traditional practice of including multiple medallions with God's name, the Prophet Muhammad, and the first four righteous caliphs, the architect emphasizes a monotheistic rigor and an ecumenical Islamic vision.

== Gallery ==
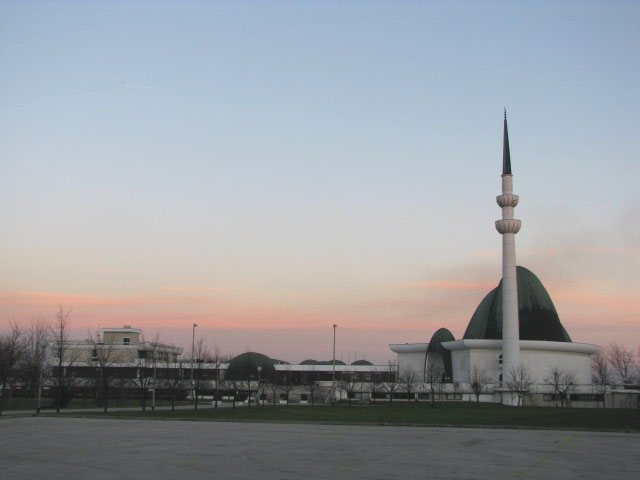
Panoramic view, 2008

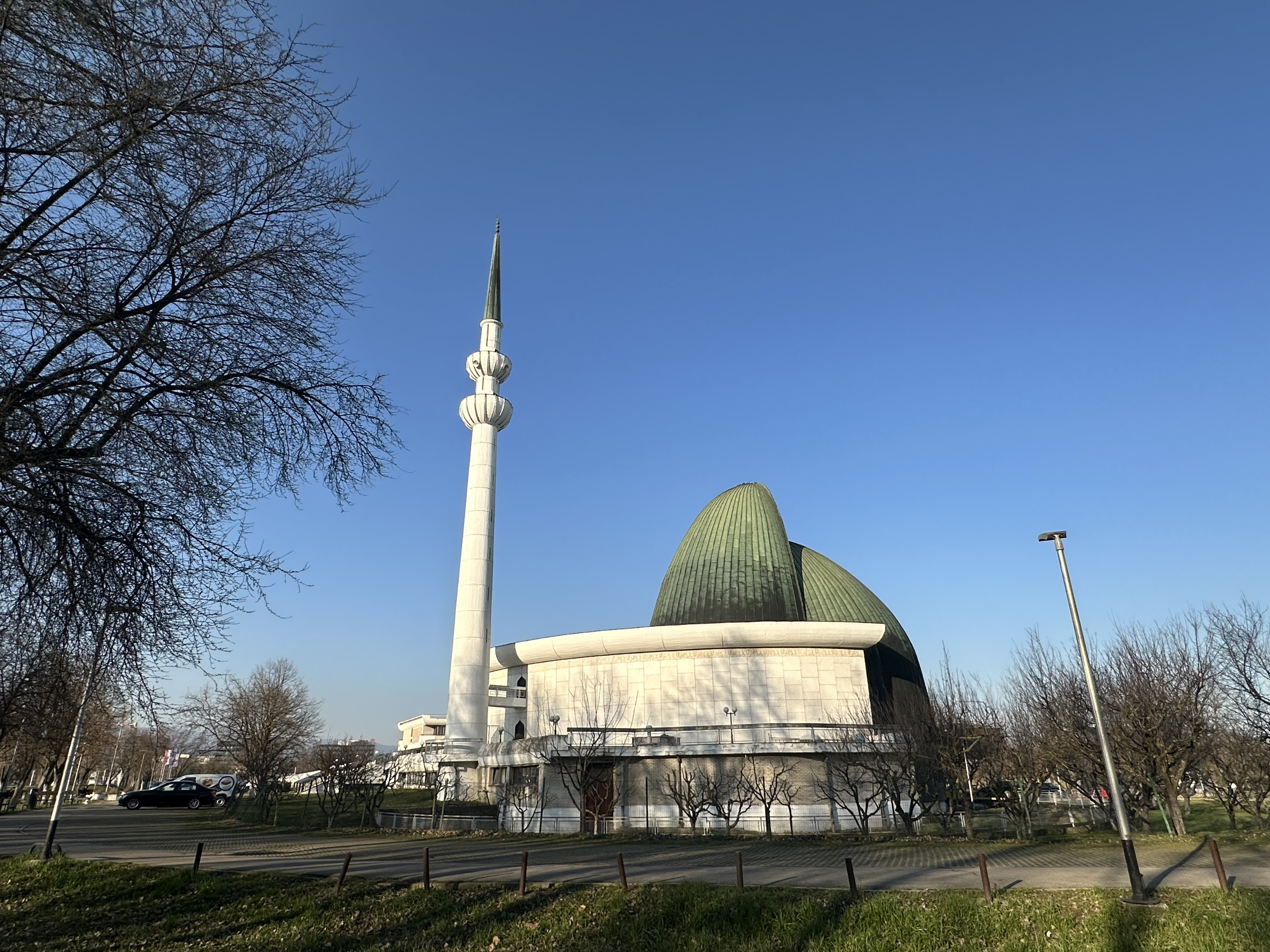
Close up

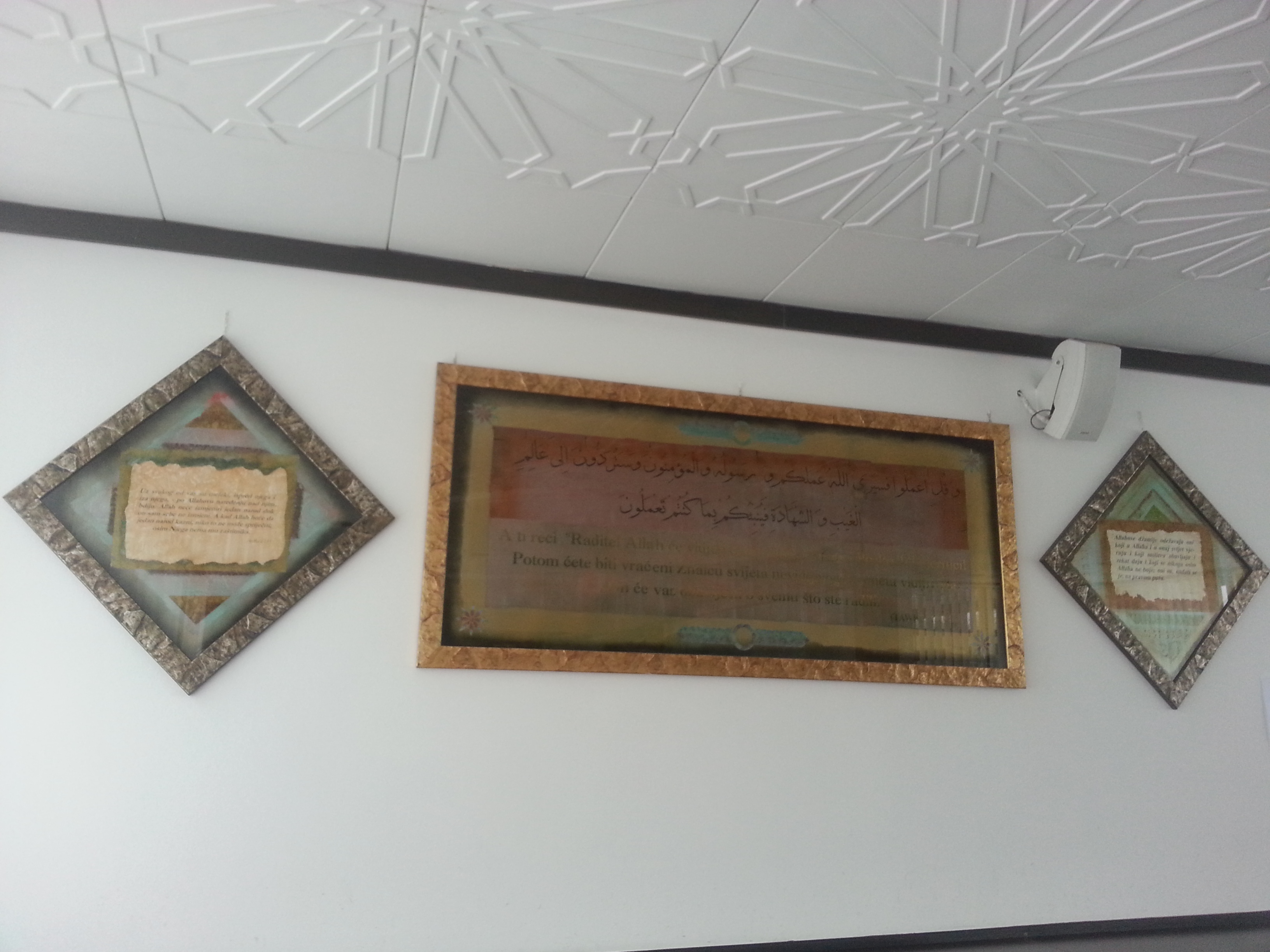
Interior

== See also ==
- Islam in Croatia
- Zagreb Cathedral
