= Islamic Community of Yugoslavia =

Organisation of Muslims in Yugoslavia

The Islamic Community of Yugoslavia (Serbo-Croatian: Islamska zajednica Jugoslavije) was an organisation of Muslims in Yugoslavia. It was established on 31 March 1930 as the Islamic Religious Community of the Kingdom of Yugoslavia within the first Yugoslav state, with the enactment of the Act on the Islamic Religious Community. The new law ended the previously existing Islamic Community established under the Austrian-Hungarian Statute for the Autonomous Administration of the Islamic Religious and Waqf-Mearif Affairs from 1909. According to the new law, the seat of the reis-ul-ulema, the head of the Islamic Community was placed in Belgrade. The King had the power to appoint the reis-ul-ulema and the members of the majlises in Sarajevo and Skopje and nine muftis. The waqf-mearif affairs were put under the direct control of the Ministry of Justice. On 5 February 1930, Alexander I of Yugoslavia enacted the Regulation on Temporary Organisation of Governance and Affairs of the Islamic Religious Community of the Kingdom of Yugoslavia, which gave the Ministry of Justice the right to control the affairs of the Islamic Community.

The existing reis-il-ulema opposed the changes before the law was enacted, and insisted that religious and waqf officials should be elected and not appointed by the King who would appoint people close to the government. He even asked for his dismissal if such a law would be enacted. Alexander I ignored Čaušević's opposition to the changes, and on 26 February 1930, he appointed him reis-ul-ulema of the Islamic Community. Čaušević remained consistent and refused to take the office until his conditions were met. Realising that none of his requests would be met, on 11 April 1930 Čaušević asked for his dismissal even if he would be left without the state pension. On the proposal of the Ministry of Justice, Alexander I signed his dismissal on 6 June 1930.

Čaušević's successor was appointed on 12 June 1930, when Alexander I appointed the mufti of Banja Luka Ibrahim Maglajlić the new reis-ul-ulema. Maglajlić was installed to the office on 31 October 1930 in Belgrade's Bajrakli Mosque. Maglajlić was a supporter of Alexander's dictatorship and was previously a member of the ruling People's Radical Party. On 9 October 1930, Alexander enacted the new Constitution of the Islamic Community which enhanced the state control over the community and enabled the state appointment of the waqf officials.

The organization was dormant during World War II in 1941, but the Islamic Community was reconstituted in 1947 for the Muslims in the second Yugoslav state and was seated in Sarajevo, where the Reis-ul-ulema resided together with the Rijaset, the most senior body of the organisation. The Supreme Assembly of the Islamic Community of Yugoslavia was made up of members of the republican assemblies from all Yugoslavian republics, with those from Bosnia and Herzegovina, Croatia, and Slovenia seated in Sarajevo, the Serbian delegates in Pristina, the Montenegrin delegates in Titograd, and the Macedonian delegates in Skopje. Each of these republican assemblies also had their rijaset.

In 1990, the Islamic Community adopted its new constitution, making Zagreb the center for the republican assemblies of Croatia and Slovenia, while the republican assembly in Sarajevo represented Bosnia and Herzegovina only. The status of other republican assemblies remained the same. With the new constitution, the republican assemblies were renamed to mešihat. On 9 March 1991, the Islamic Community gained the first democratically elected Reis-ul-ulema, a Macedonian Jakub Selimoski.

With the breakup of Yugoslavia and the international recognition of its newly independent countries, several independent Islamic communities were established. The Islamic Community of Yugoslavia adopted another Constitution in Skopje on 5 February 1993, recognising the independence of separated communities. At the same time Bosnia and Herzegovina, Macedonia, and Montenegro established their Islamic communities. The Meshihat of Serbia with a seat in Pristina, was renamed to the Islamic Community of Kosovo. The meeting of the representatives of the newly formed mešihats in Istanbul at the end of October 1997, was a formal end of the Islamic Community of Yugoslavia.

== List of Reis-ul-ulema (1930–1993) ==
No.	Name	Leadership	Place of birth
1	Effendi; Ibrahim Maglajlić (1861–1936)	31 October 1930 – 14 March 1936 (5 years, 276 days)	Banja Luka, Bosnia Eyalet
2	Fehim Spaho (1877–1942)	9 June 1938 – 14 February 1942 (3 years, 250 days)	Sarajevo, Bosnia vilayet
3	Effendi; Ibrahim Fejić (1879–1962)	12 September 1947 – 8 December 1957 (10 years, 87 days)	Mostar, Condominium of Bosnia and Herzegovina
4	Effendi; Sulejman Kemura (1908–1975)	8 December 1957 – 19 January 1975 (17 years, 42 days)	Sarajevo, Condominium of Bosnia and Herzegovina
5	Effendi; Naim Hadžiabdić (1918–1987)	18 May 1975 – 3 July 1987 (12 years, 46 days)	Donji Vakuf, Condominium of Bosnia and Herzegovina
6	Effendi; Husein Mujić (1918–1993)	11 December 1987 – 1989	Gračanica, Condominium of Bosnia and Herzegovina
7	Effendi; Jakub Selimoski (1946–2013)	9 March 1991 – April 1993	Kičevo, Macedonia

== See also ==
- Islamic Community in Bosnia and Herzegovina
