= Islamic Community of Kosovo =

Organization

- Bashkësia Islame e Kosovës
- Formation: 1993
- Type: Religious organization
- Headquarters: Pristina
- Region served: Kosovo; Preševo Valley
- Official language: Albanian
- Grand Mufti: Naim Tërnava
- Main organ: Assembly
- Website: bislame.net

The Islamic Community of Kosovo (ICK; Albanian: Bashkësia Islame e Kosovës), is an independent religious organization of Muslims in Kosovo and the Preševo Valley. The community's headquarters are located in Pristina and their current leader, the Grand Mufti (Albanian: Kryemyftiu), is Naim Tërnava.

== History ==
Organized Islamic activities have taken place in Kosovo since the Ottoman Empire ruled over the region. All Muslims of the empire were part of the Islamic community, which was headed by the Sultan.

During the reign of Sultan Murad II, responsibilities of the caliph were transferred to the Grand Mufti. Since then, the Grand Mufti was given the honorific scholarly title Sheykhul-Islam and considered the highest religious authority within the Ottoman Empire. Additionally, every region inhabited by Muslims has had its own mufti. Each regional mufti was subordinate to the Sheykhul-Islam.

During the period 1941 to 1944, the faith community in Kosovo joined the Muslim Community of Albania (Albanian: Komuniteti Mysliman i Shqipërisë, which was headed by the Grand Mufti based in Tirana.

After the First World War, Kosovo was placed under the Kingdom of Serbs, Croats, and Slovenes. The Islamic community of the kingdom was headed by Reis-ul-ulama, based in Sarajevo. The responsibility of the Reis-ul-ulama was to organize Muslim religious life in Bosnia, Herzegovina, Croatia, and Slovenia. In contrast, in Serbia, Montenegro, Vardar Macedonia, and Kosovo, Muslim religious life was organized by the Supreme Mufti, subordinate to the Reis-ul-ulama whose office was in Belgrade.

After the creation of the Kingdom of Yugoslavia, the responsibilities of the Supreme Mufti were transferred to the Ulama Majlis in Skopje and the responsibilities of the Reis-ul-ulama were transferred to the Ulama Majlis in Sarajevo. The newly established Ulama Majlises formed the Rijaset of Islamic community, with its head office in Sarajevo.

After the Second World War, the Islamic community of Kosovo became part of the Islamic Community of Serbia, based in Pristina. The Islamic community of Serbia was part of the Islamic Community of Yugoslavia (Rijaset), based in Sarajevo. The Islamic community of Kosovo then declared independence from the Rijaset on 11 December 1993.

=== Kosovo Conflict (1998–1999) ===
The central historical archive belonging to the Islamic Community of Kosovo containing community records spanning 500 years was burned down on June 13, 1999 by Yugoslav Serb police after an armistice and some hours prior to the coming of NATO peacekeeping troops to Pristina. The Hadum Suleiman Aga library (founded 1595) in Gjakova, was burned down (March 24) by Yugoslav Serb troops resulting in the loss of the regional archives of the Islamic Community spanning to the 17th century.

=== Modern period ===
On 26 November 2019, an earthquake struck Albania. The Islamic Community of Kosovo organised a fundraising effort on 29 November after Friday prayers across all its mosques within the country and sent several convoys of aid to earthquake victims. In 2024, the Islamic community of Kosovo deconstructed the Haxhi Veseli Mosque build a more modern one.

== Structure ==
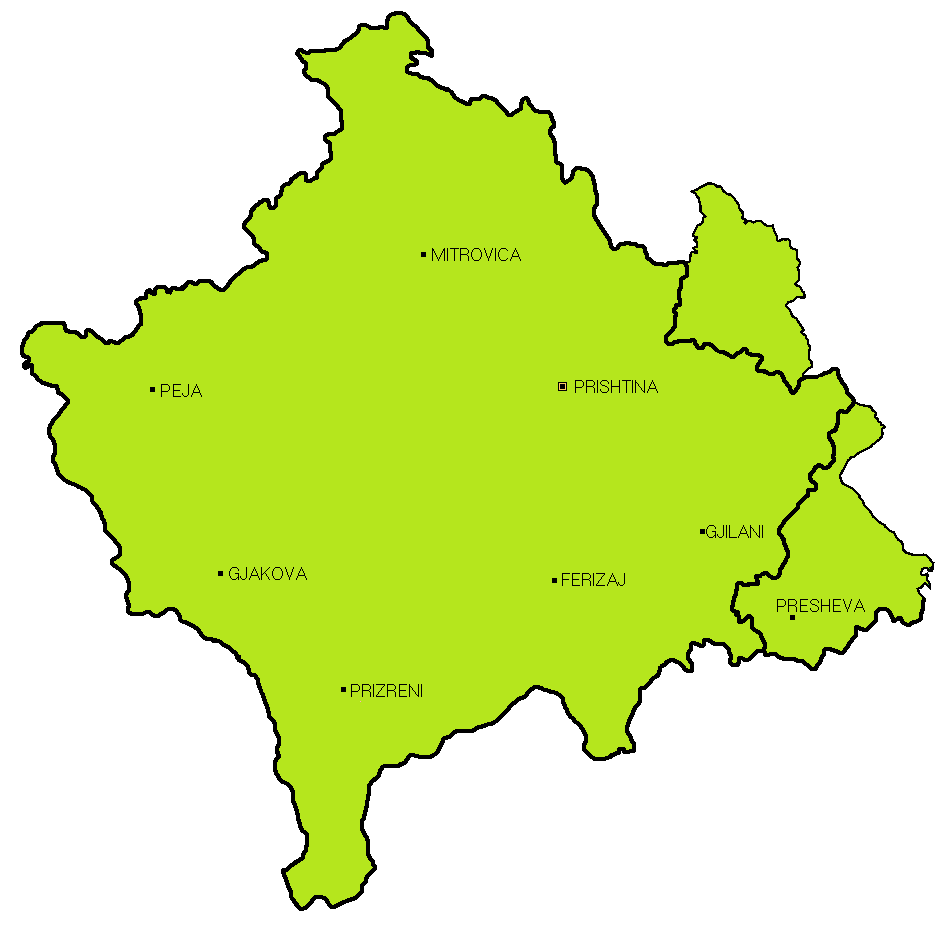
Map of the territories that are under the authority of the Islamic Community of Kosovo.

The Islamic community of Kosovo is divided into 8 regions (Councils of Islamic Community):

- Council of Islamic Community of Prishtina
- Council of Islamic Community of Gjilan
- Council of Islamic Community of Mitrovica
- Council of Islamic Community of Prizren
- Council of Islamic Community of Peja
- Council of Islamic Community of Gjakova
- Council of Islamic Community of Presheva (Serbia)

== See also ==
- Islam in Kosovo
- Religion in Kosovo
- Muslim Community of Albania
- List of mosques in Kosovo

== Sources ==
- I.C.K. Official Website
