= Islam in Kosovo =

Islam in Europe by percentage of country population 95–100%: Azerbaijan; 90–95%: Turkey; Kosovo; 50–70%: Albania; Bosnia and Herzegovina; Kazakhstan; 30–35%: North Macedonia; 10–20%: France; Sweden; Georgia; Montenegro; 5–10%: Austria; Belgium; Bulgaria; Denmark; Germany; Liechtenstein; Luxembourg; Netherlands; Russia; Switzerland; United Kingdom; Spain; Greece; 4–5%: Serbia; 2–4%: Italy; Finland; Norway; Malta; Slovenia; Cyprus (Note: Only takes into account the Muslim population residing on land controlled by the Republic of Cyprus.); 1–2%: Croatia; Ireland; Ukraine; Andorra; < 1%: Iceland; Armenia; Belarus; Czech Republic; Estonia; Hungary; Latvia; Lithuania; Moldova; Monaco; Poland; Portugal; Romania; San Marino; Slovakia

The practice of Islam in Kosovo has a long-standing tradition dating back to the Ottoman conquest of the Balkans. Before the Battle of Kosovo in 1389, the entire Balkan region had been Christianized by both the Western and Eastern Roman Empire. From 1389 until 1912, Kosovo was officially governed by the Muslim Ottoman Empire and a high level of Islamization occurred among Catholic and Orthodox Albanians, mainly due to Sufi orders and socio-political opportunism. Both Christian and Muslim Albanians intermarried and some lived as "Laramans", also known as Crypto-Christians. During the time period after World War II, Kosovo was ruled by secular socialist authorities in the Socialist Federal Republic of Yugoslavia (SFRY). During that period, Kosovars became increasingly secularized. After the end of the communist period, religion had a revival in Kosovo. Today, 95.6% of Kosovo's population are Sunni Muslims, most of whom are ethnic Albanians. There are also non-Albanian speaking Muslims, who define themselves as Bosniaks, Gorani and Turks.

Islam in Kosovo is predominantly Hanafi Sunni, the most widespread tradition in the Balkans. Additionally, Kosovo has Sufi orders, particularly the Bektashi order, which blends elements of Shia and Sufi traditions. Other Sufi brotherhoods, such as the Halveti and Kadiri orders, also exist. According to a 2012 study by the Pew Research Center, 58% of muslims in Kosovo are non-denominational Muslims, which is practicing Islam without strict adherence to a particular sect or school of thought.

== History ==
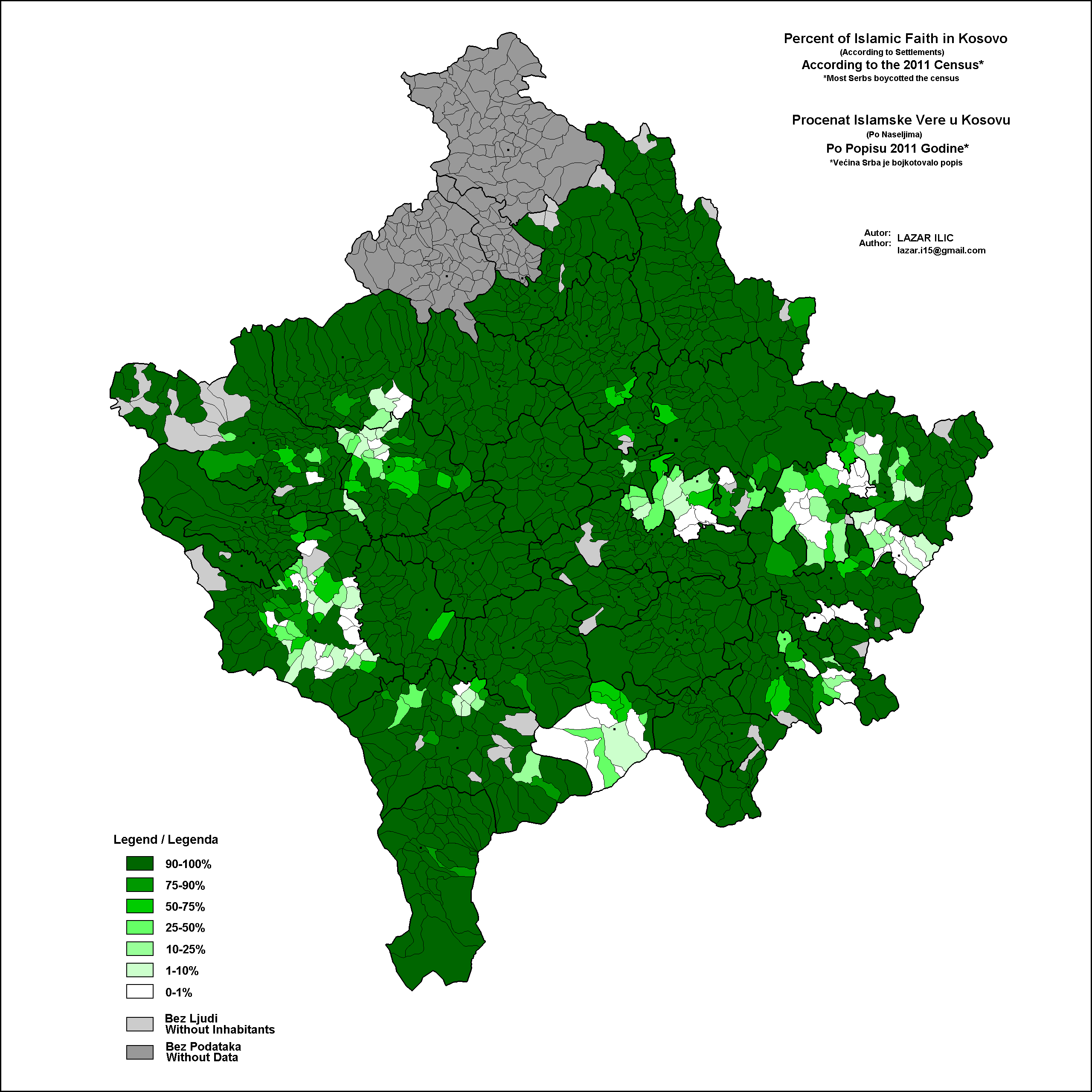
Map showing percent of Islamic Faith in Kosovo, 2011

Until the sixteenth century the degree of Islamisation in Kosovo was minimal, and largely confined to urban centres. The pace of conversions to Islam only increased significantly in the second half of the sixteenth century, possibly because high taxes, Ottoman retaliations and forced conversions. Prior to the Ottomans, both Catholic and Orthodox Churches had waged a ruthless war over the hearts, minds and souls of the Albanians, and this situation was exploited by the Ottomans. Both the Serbian Orthodox Church and the Sultan viewed the conversion of Albanians to Islam as something positive as it weakened the Balkan Catholic nucleus, and the Sultan received new subjects.

Converts also became exempt from the cizje, a protective tax levied only on non-Muslim males. But that was certainly not the only cause of the people turning to Islam. The tax burden tended to go up as Ottoman power relative to foreign Christian powers came under challenge. So far as Catholic Albanians were concerned, the Catholic church was less powerful and privileged within the Ottoman Empire than the Serbian Orthodox Church (and less well staffed); the Bektashi Order of dervishes carried out a conversion campaign which stressed the similarities between their version of Islam and Christianity (the Bektashis drank wine and had a quasi-Trinitarian doctrine). A phenomenon of "crypto-Catholicism" developed in Kosovo Albanian society, where large numbers of people would convert officially to Islam but follow Catholic rites in private. From 1703 ecclesiastical decrees banned this practice and did not accept that crypto-Catholics could receive holy rites. In 1717, Lady Mary Wortley Montagu, wife of the British Ambassador to the Sublime Porte wrote that her Albanian escort from Belgrade to Istanbul claimed to go to the mosque on Fridays and church on Sundays. At any rate, by 1750, most Christian families had converted to Islam, for the benefits of social networking of the citizens and for financial soundness. Albanians in Kosovo who had been passing as Muslims were declaring themselves Catholics (to avoid conscription) as late as 1845.

== Kosovo War ==
Numerous Albanian cultural sites in Kosovo were destroyed during the Kosovo conflict (1998-1999) which constituted a war crime violating the Hague and Geneva Conventions. Of the 498 mosques in Kosovo that were in active use, the International Criminal Tribunal for the former Yugoslavia (ICTY) documented that 225 mosques sustained damage or destruction by the Yugoslav Serb army. In all, eighteen months of the Yugoslav Serb counterinsurgency campaign between 1998 and 1999 within Kosovo resulted in 225 or a third out of a total of 600 mosques being damaged, vandalised, or destroyed alongside other Islamic architecture during the conflict. Sufi lodges (tekkes), Muslim theological schools (madrasas) and Islamic libraries sustained damage or destruction resulting in the loss of rare books, manuscripts and other collections of literature. Archives belonging to the Islamic Community of Kosovo with records spanning 500 years were also destroyed. During the war, Islamic architectural heritage posed for Yugoslav Serb paramilitary and military forces as Albanian patrimony with destruction of non-Serbian architectural heritage being a methodical and planned component of ethnic cleansing in Kosovo. In the aftermath of the war, a wave of revenge attacks on dozens of Serbian Orthodox churches by Muslim Albanians resulting in being damaged or destroyed. These attacks effectively ended after six weeks, with 35 churches destroyed or damaged, at the end of August 1999, after appeals by Kosovo's political leaders and by the Mufti.

== Organization ==
Since Yugoslav times, the official organisation of Muslims in Kosovo has been the Islamic Community of Kosovo, led by its Grand Mufti, currently Naim Tërnava. Bektashi tekkes are subject to the Bektashi order, and in some areas fundings from Saudi Arabia or other countries has led to concern about possible Wahhabi-Salafi attempts to influence Kosovo and its social habits, although such influences are very rarely visible. The majority of Roma Muslims belong to Sufi brotherhoods, a sizeable number of practising Albanian Muslims also. In most of the western half of Kosovo, nearly every village has at least one Sufi brotherhood. Albanians in the mountainous 'Sufi belt' of Kosovo have chased away many of their Roma or Gorani neighbours, even though they often belonged to the same Sufi brotherhoods.

== Interfaith relations ==
There have long been contacts between the Islamic Community of Kosovo and the Catholic Church in Kosovo, and in 2011 regular meetings began at the level of Mufti and Bishops both of the Catholic Church and the Serbian Orthodox Church in Kosovo. But for most of Kosovo's history, there has been a rift between Serbian Orthodox Christianity versus Albanian Catholic Christianity and Albanian Sunni Islam, as existing in the country.

== Political influence ==
While individual politicians may be influenced in their attitudes or decisions by Islamic beliefs, only one political party, the Justice Party, includes in its party programme a commitment to traditional Islamic values. It argued in 2010 for Islamic religious teaching in state schools for children from families with a Muslim family background: this was rejected by the Kosovo Assembly. In the parliamentary elections in Kosovo it took part in an electoral coalition led by the AKR (Alliance for a New Kosovo), together with firmly secular parties, presumably because it was unlikely to reach the threshold for parliamentary representation on its own. The AKR coalition itself came in fourth place in the elections with 7.29% of the total vote. (In the 2001 elections the Kosovo Christian Democratic Party, a Kosovo Albanian political entity, won one seat in the Assembly elections; its leadership included people with Muslim names).

== Extremism ==
Islamist volunteers in the Kosovo Liberation Army from Western Europe of ethnic Albanian, Turkish, and North African origin, were recruited by Islamist leaders in Western Europe allied to Bin Laden and Zawahiri. Some 175 Yemeni mujahideen arrived in early May 1998. There were also a dozen Saudi and Egyptian mujahideen.

Since the Kosovo War, there has been an increasing radicalization of Islam in Kosovo. Wahhabism, which is dominant in Saudi Arabia, has gained a foothold in Kosovo through Saudi diplomacy. Saudi money has paid for new mosques, while Saudi-educated imams have arrived since the end of the war in 1999. During UN administration, Saudi Arabian organizations sought to establish a cultural foothold in Kosovo. 98 Wahhabist schools were set up by Saudi organizations during UN administration. The Kosovo Police arrested some 40 suspected Islamist militants on 11 August 2014. These were suspected of having fought with Islamist insurgent groups in Syria and Iraq.

By April 2015, a total of 232 Kosovo Albanians had gone to Syria to fight with Islamist groups, most commonly the Islamic State. Forty of these are from the town of Skënderaj, according to Kosovo police reports. As of September 2014, a total of 48 ethnic Albanians have been killed fighting in Syria. The number of fighters from Kosovo is at least 232 and estimated at more than 300 (as of 11 February 2016). A 2017 UNDP study shows that Islamic extremism has grown in Kosovo.

== Gallery ==
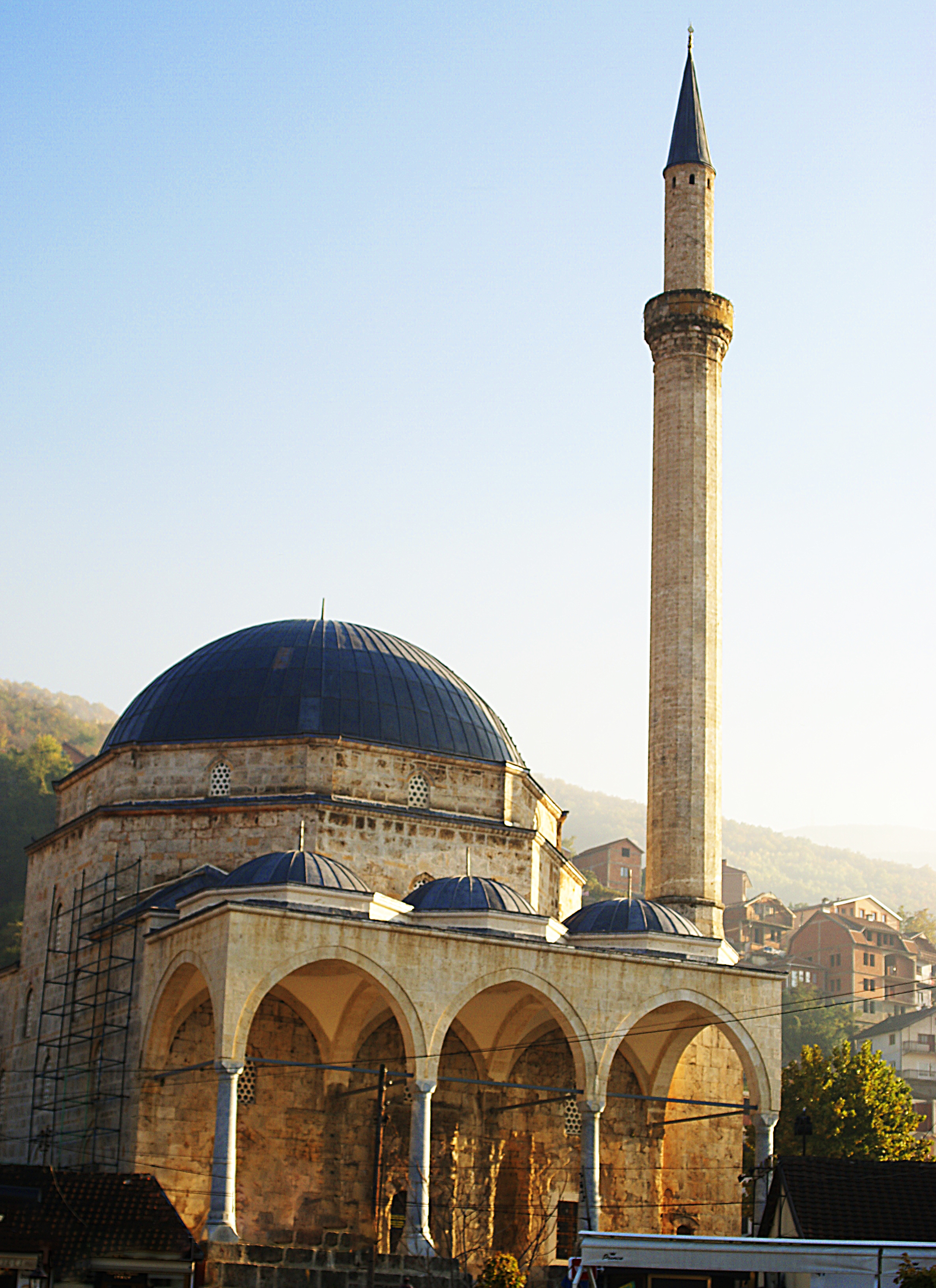
Sinan Pasha Mosque in Prizren.

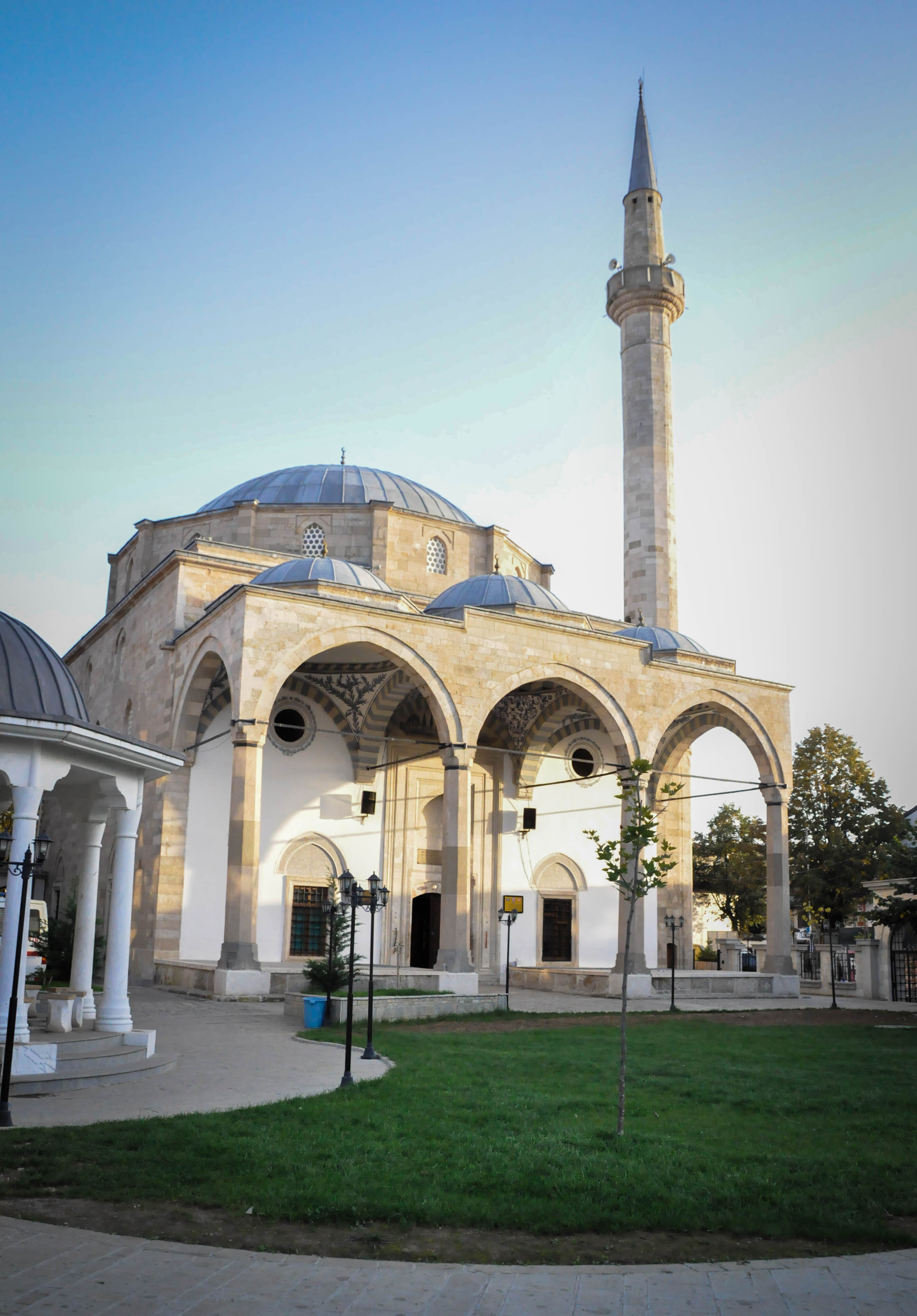
Imperial Mosque in Pristina.

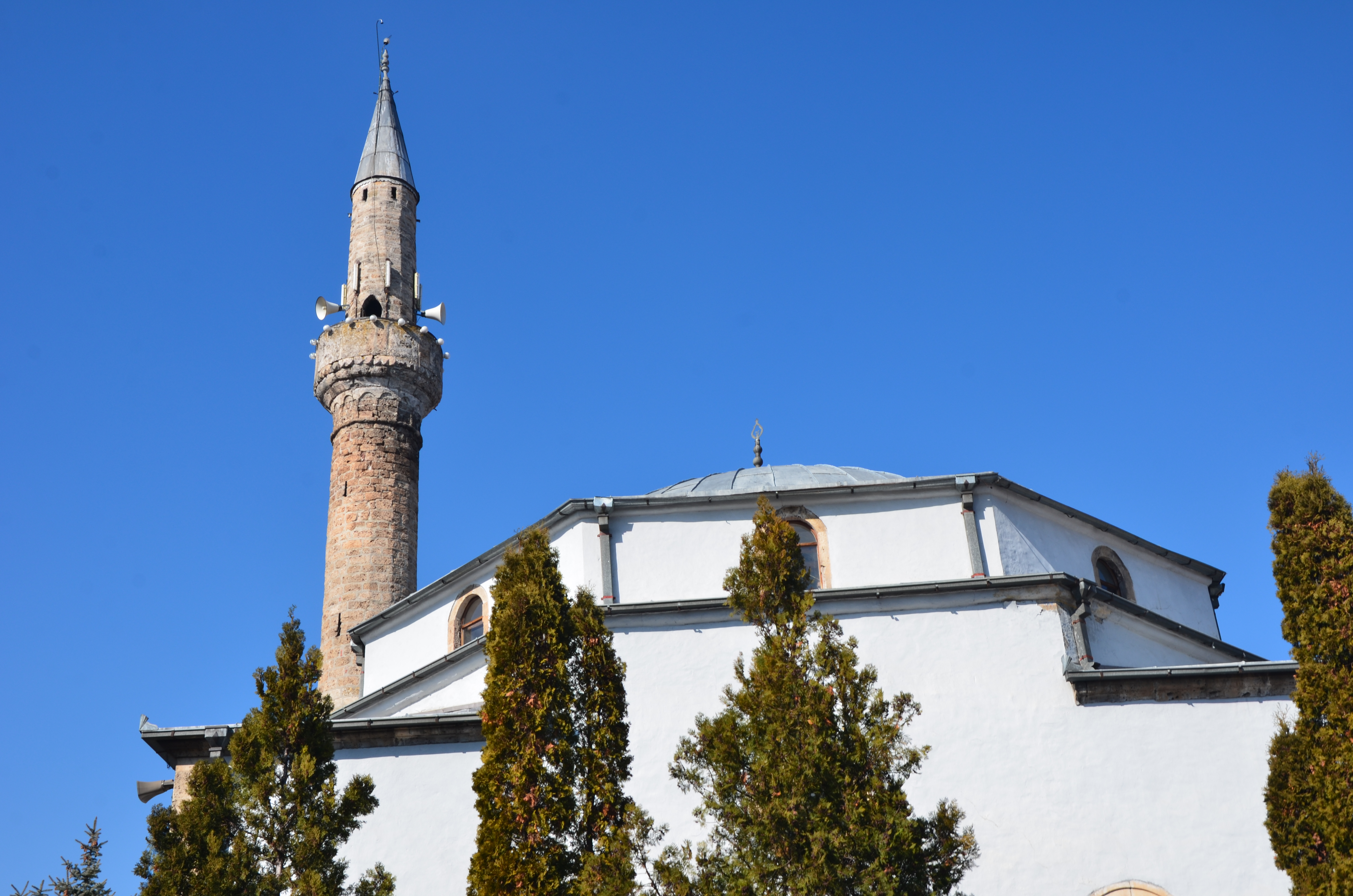
Bajrakli Mosque, Peja.

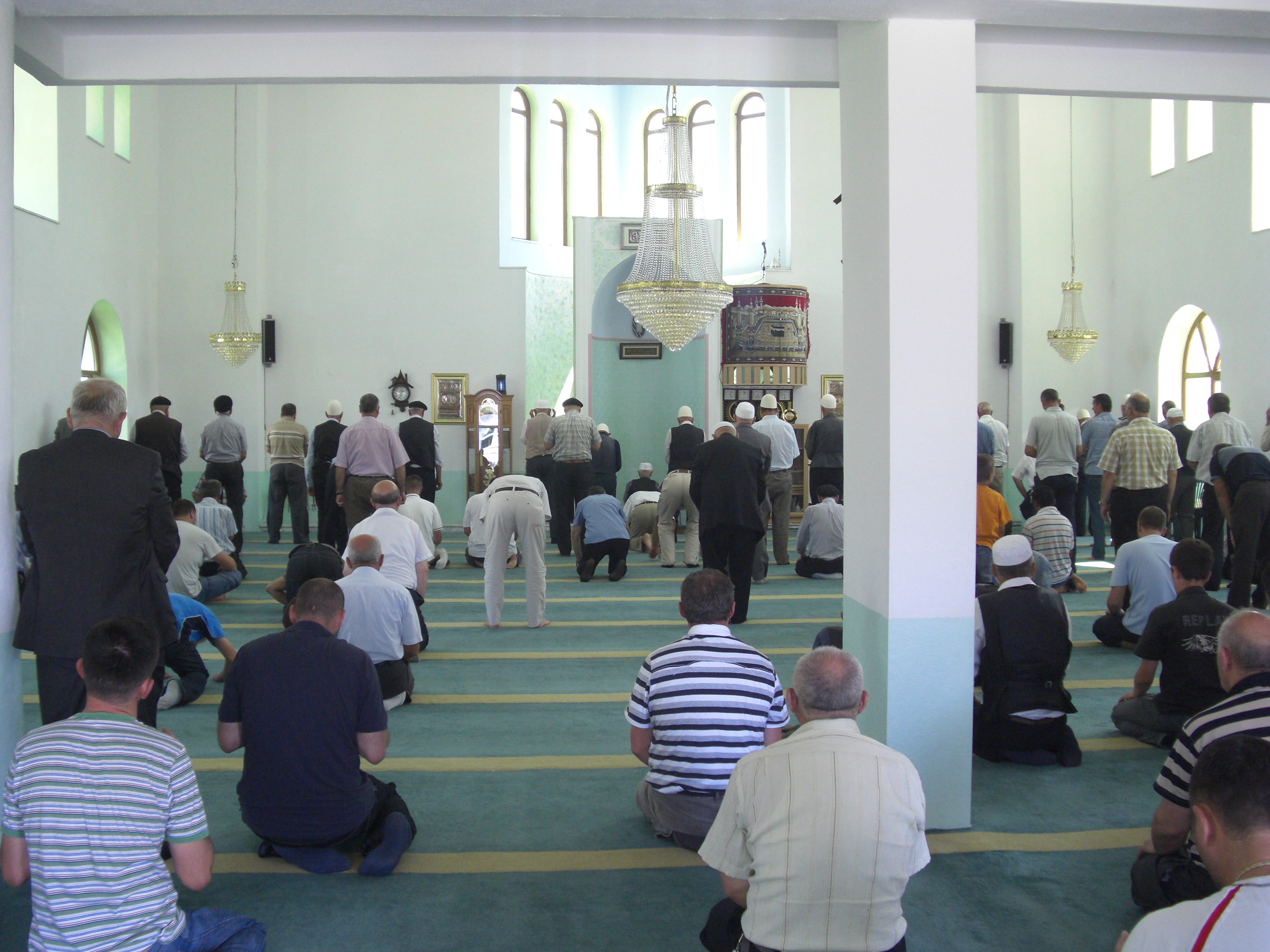
Praying at the mosque in Obiliq.

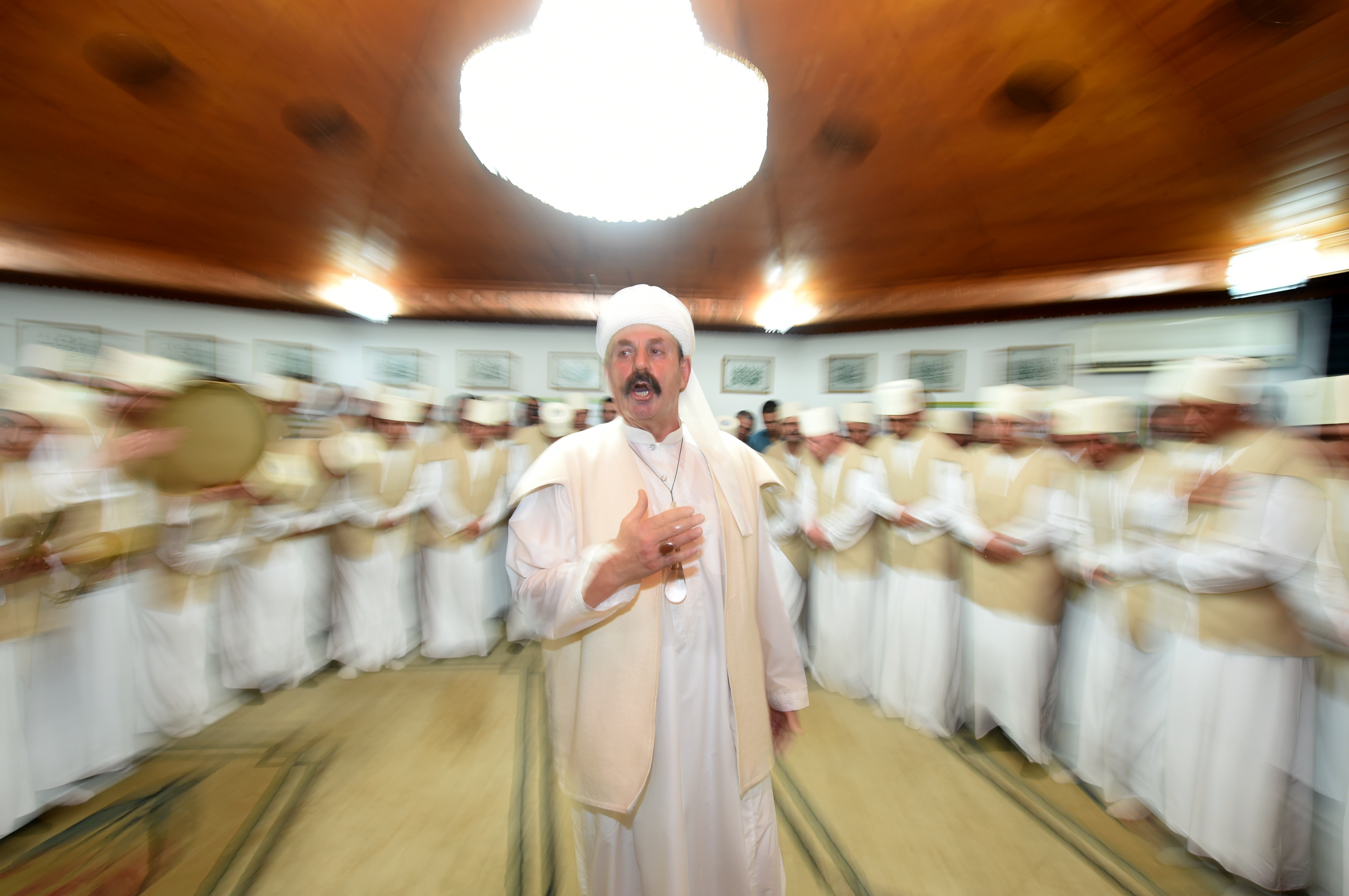
Sufi ceremony at the Sheh Emin Teqe, Gjakova

== See also ==
- Islamic Community of Kosova
- Bosniaks in Kosovo
- Gorani people
- Turks in Kosovo
- Religion in Kosovo
- Christianity in Kosovo

== Sources ==
- Herscher, Andrew; Riedlmayer, András (2000). "Monument and crime: The destruction of historic architecture in Kosovo". Grey Room. 1 (1): 108–122. doi:10.1162/152638100750173083. JSTOR 1262553. S2CID 57566872.
