= Haxhi Veseli Mosque =

Mosque in Mitrovica, Kosovo

Coordinates: 42.8840°N 20.8651°E

Religion
- Affiliation: Islam

Location
- Location: Mitrovica
- Country: Kosovo
- Interactive map of Haxhi Veseli Mosque

Architecture
- Type: Mosque
- Completed: 1450; 576 years ago

The Haxhi Veseli Mosque (Albanian: Xhamia e Haxhi e Veselit), also known as Xhamia e Tregut, is a mosque in Mitrovica, Kosovo.

== History ==
It was built initially as a mosque (without a minaret) in 1450 by Hysen Çaushi and then completed with a minaret in 1777 by Haxhi Veseli. In 1999, the mosque was burned down by Serbian forces. Hundreds of thousands of valuable books from the past were burnt from the fire. The bodies of dozens of Albanian civilians are buried in its courtyard. After the war, it was repaired with the monetary funds of the United Arab Emirates.

In 2024, the mosque was destructed by the Islamic Community of Kosovo to build a more modern mosque.
