= Fehim Spaho =

2nd Grand Mufti of Yugoslavia from 1938 to 1942

Effendi Fehim Spaho
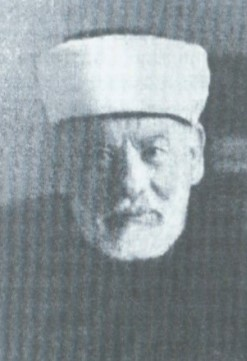
- Title: 2nd Grand Mufti of Yugoslavia

Personal life
- Born: 13 February 1877 Sarajevo, Bosnia Vilayet, Ottoman Empire
- Died: 14 February 1942 (aged 65) Sarajevo, Independent State of Croatia
- Resting place: Gazi Husrev-beg Mosque, Sarajevo
- Occupation: grand mufti; writer; translator

Religious life
- Religion: Sunni Islam

Senior posting
- Period in office: 9 June 1938 – 14 February 1942
- Predecessor: Ibrahim Maglajlić
- Successor: Ibrahim Fejić

Fehim ef. Spaho (13 February 1877 – 14 February 1942) was a Bosnian cleric, writer and translator who served as the Grand Mufti of Yugoslavia from 1938 to 1942. He is one of the most prominent Bosnian Muslim cultural figures of his time.

== Biography ==
Fehim Spaho was born on 13 February 1877 in Ottoman-controlled Sarajevo to a coppersmith family. His father, Hasan Spaho was an expert of the Sharia law. Before the Austro-Hungarian occupation in 1878, he was a judge in Jajce, Sofia, Damascus and Cairo. His mother was Fatima (née Bičakčić). Spaho had two brothers, Mehmed, a notable politician, and Mustafa, and three sisters, Behija, Aiša and Habiba.

Spaho was educated in Sarajevo and attended Sharia Law school. He worked in varying positions in Sarajevo and Belgrade's local governments between 1901 and 1920. He later returned to Sarajevo, where he was a senior government adviser on faith. He served as president of the Higher Sharia Court in Sarajevo from 1936 until 1938.

On 20 April 1938, Spaho was among three candidates for the position of Grand Mufti of Yugoslavia. He was appointed on 26 April 1938, and his inauguration ceremony occurred in Sarajevo's Emperor's Mosque on 9 June 1938. Following the start of World War II and the establishment of the Independent State of Croatia (NDH), Spaho continued to serve as Grand Mufti. Alongside archbishop Ivan Šarić, he supported Croatian fascist leader Ante Pavelić and the creation of the NDH.

Spaho served until his sudden death on 14 February 1942 in war-torn Sarajevo, one day after turning 65.

== Works ==
=== Short stories ===
- Mladi kućanik (Sarajevo, 1901)

=== Scientific works ===
- Turski rudarski zakoni (Sarajevo, 1913)
- Naši narodni nazivi mjeseci u turskim kalendarima iz XVII Vijeka (Sarajevo, 1930)
- Staroslovenski crkveni stihovi u arapskom pismu (Sarajevo, 1931)
- Jedan turski dokumenat o Krbavskoj bitci 1493 (Sarajevo, 1931)
- Prve kavane su otvorene u našim krajevima (Sarajevo, 1931–1932)
- Pobune u Tuzlanskom srezu polovicom XVIII Vijeka (Sarajevo, 1933)
- Još jedan neobjavljen dokumenat iz pokreta Husejn kapetana Gradaščevića (Sarajevo, 1934)
- Iz javnog i privatnog života u Doba Turaka (Beograd, 1936)
- Mješoviti brakovi (Sarajevo, 1938)
- Arapski, perzijski i turski rukopisi Hrvatskih zemaljskih muzeja u Sarajevu (Sarajevo, 1942)

=== Translations ===
- Hiljadu i jedna Noć (Binbir Gece Masalları) (Sarajevo, 1925)
- Saliha Hanuma (Saliha Hanım) (Sarajevo, 1923)
- Safija (Safiya) (Sarajevo, 1923)
- Grmuša (Çalıkuşu) (Sarakevo, 1923)
- Kad sunce zalazi (Gün batarken) (Sarajevo, 1924)
- Zaboravljena ljubav (Aşk-i memnu) (Sarajevo, 1924)
- Zaostale bilješke umrle žene (Olmüs Bir Kadinin Evrak-i Metrukesi) (Sarajevo, 1924)
- Bolja na srcu (Kalp Ağrisi) (Sarajevo, 1927)
- Handana (Handan) (Sarajevo, 1930)

=== Translations of stories ===
- Trešnje (Kızılcık Dalları) (Sarajevo, 1929. – 30.)
- Jedna nedužna prevara (Masumane Bir Hile) (Sarajevo, 1929. – 30.)
- Na oporavak (Nekâhat) (Sarajevo, 1930.)
- Tetka Hava (Havva Teyze) (Sarajevo, 1932.)
- Babur Šahova sedžada (Babür Šah'in Seccadesi) (Sarajevo, 1936.)
- Čigra (Topac) (Sarajevo, 1938.)

Religious titles
Preceded by Ibrahim Maglajlić	2nd Grand Mufti of Yugoslavia; 1938–1942	Succeeded by Ibrahim Fejić
