= Ibrahim Maglajlić =

5th Grand Mufti of Yugoslavia from 1930 to 1936

Hafiz Ibrahim Maglajlić
- Title: 1st Grand Mufti of Yugoslavia

Personal life
- Born: 25 April 1861 Banja Luka, Bosnia Vilayet, Ottoman Empire
- Died: 16 September 1936 (aged 75) Banja Luka, Kingdom of Yugoslavia
- Resting place: Gazanferija Mosque, Banja Luka

Religious life
- Religion: Sunni Islam

Senior posting
- Period in office: 31 October 1930 – 14 March 1936
- Predecessor: Džemaludin Čaušević (as Grand Mufti for Bosnia and Herzegovina)
- Successor: Fehim Spaho

1st President of the Yugoslav Muslim Organization
- In office 1919–1923
- Preceded by: Office established
- Succeeded by: Mehmed Spaho

Hfz. Ibrahim Maglajlić (25 April 1861 – 16 September 1936) was a Bosnian cleric and politician who served as the first Grand Mufti of Yugoslavia from 1930 to 1936.

== Biography ==
He was born in 1861 in Banja Luka, where he completed his primary school and madrasah under the professor Smail Skopljak. During the Austro-Hungarian occupation of Bosnia and Herzegovina, he joined the resistance forces. Because of that he was interned in the town of Olomouc. After returning from captivity, he went to study in Istanbul and after that he returned to Bosnia and Herzegovina in 1887, when he was appointed principal of the Maglajlić (Fevzija) Madrasah in Banja Luka. In 1898, he was appointed for principal of the school of Ruždija. He remained in that position until 1914, when he was appointed to mufti of Tuzla. In Tuzla, he waited for the end of the World War I and the formation of the Kingdom of Serbs, Croats and Slovenes. In 1919, together with the more famous Bosniaks of that time, he founded a political party, the Yugoslav Muslim Organization (JMO), and was its first president. In the elections for the Yugoslav Constituent Assembly in 1920, he was elected a member of parliament. After a split in the party, he founded a new political party, the Yugoslav Muslim People's Organization (JMNO), but did not win a single political mandate. In 1925, he was transferred to the position of mufti of Banja Luka, and in 1929, he retired.

He was appointed as the Grand Mufti of the Islamic Community of the Kingdom of Yugoslavia on 12 June 1930. As Mustafa Kemal Atatürk abolished the Caliphate and the office of Sheikh-ul-Islam Mesihat in Turkey, there was no longer an institution that would grant the Grand Mufti menshura, so a special body (the Menshura Council) in Yugoslavia was established, consisting of members of both Ulema Majlis (Sarajevo and Skopje), delegates of the Vakuf-Mearif Councils and members of the Supreme Sharia Courts. The ceremonial enthronement took place in the Bajrakli Mosque in Belgrade on 31 October 1930, when the Riyasat and the seat of the Grad Mufti were transferred from Sarajevo to Belgrade. He was retired on 14 March 1936. When king Alexander I of Yugoslavia was killed and regime changed, the Riyasat and the seat of the Grand Mufti were returned to Sarajevo. He died a few months later in Banja Luka, on September 16, 1936.

In 2019, there was an initiative to rebuild the Maglajlić (Fejzije) Madrasah. In 2020, the first generation of students was enrolled, which was called the Golden Generation. The madrasa is located in Banja Luka, next to the Gazanferija Mosque. In front of the mosque is the grave of hfz. Ibrahim Maglajlić.

Religious titles
Preceded by Džemaludin Čaušević as Grand Mufti for Bosnia and Herzegovina	1st Grand Mufti of Yugoslavia; 1930–1936	Succeeded by Fehim Spaho
Political offices
Preceded by Office established	1st President of the Yugoslav Muslim Organization; 1919–1923	Succeeded by Mehmed Spaho
