= Zelinja Srednja =

- Village
- Location within Bosnia and Herzegovina
- Coordinates: 44°49′17″N 18°21′45″E
- Country: Bosnia and Herzegovina
- Entity: Federation of Bosnia and Herzegovina
- Canton: Tuzla
- Municipality: Gradačac

Area
  - Total: 2.84 sq mi (7.36 km^{2})

Population (2013)
  - Total: 1,253
  - Density: 441/sq mi (170/km^{2})
- Time zone: UTC+1 (CET)
  - Summer (DST): UTC+2 (CEST)

Zelinja Srednja is a village in the municipality of Gradačac, Bosnia and Herzegovina.

== Demographics ==
According to the 2013 census, its population was 1,253.

Ethnicity in 2013
Ethnicity	Number	Percentage
Bosniaks	1,232	98.3%
Croats	1	0.1%
other/undeclared	20	1.6%
Total	1,253	100%
