= Dr. Ahmed Smajlović Islamic Secondary School =

Islamic Secondary School Dr. Ahmed Smajlović
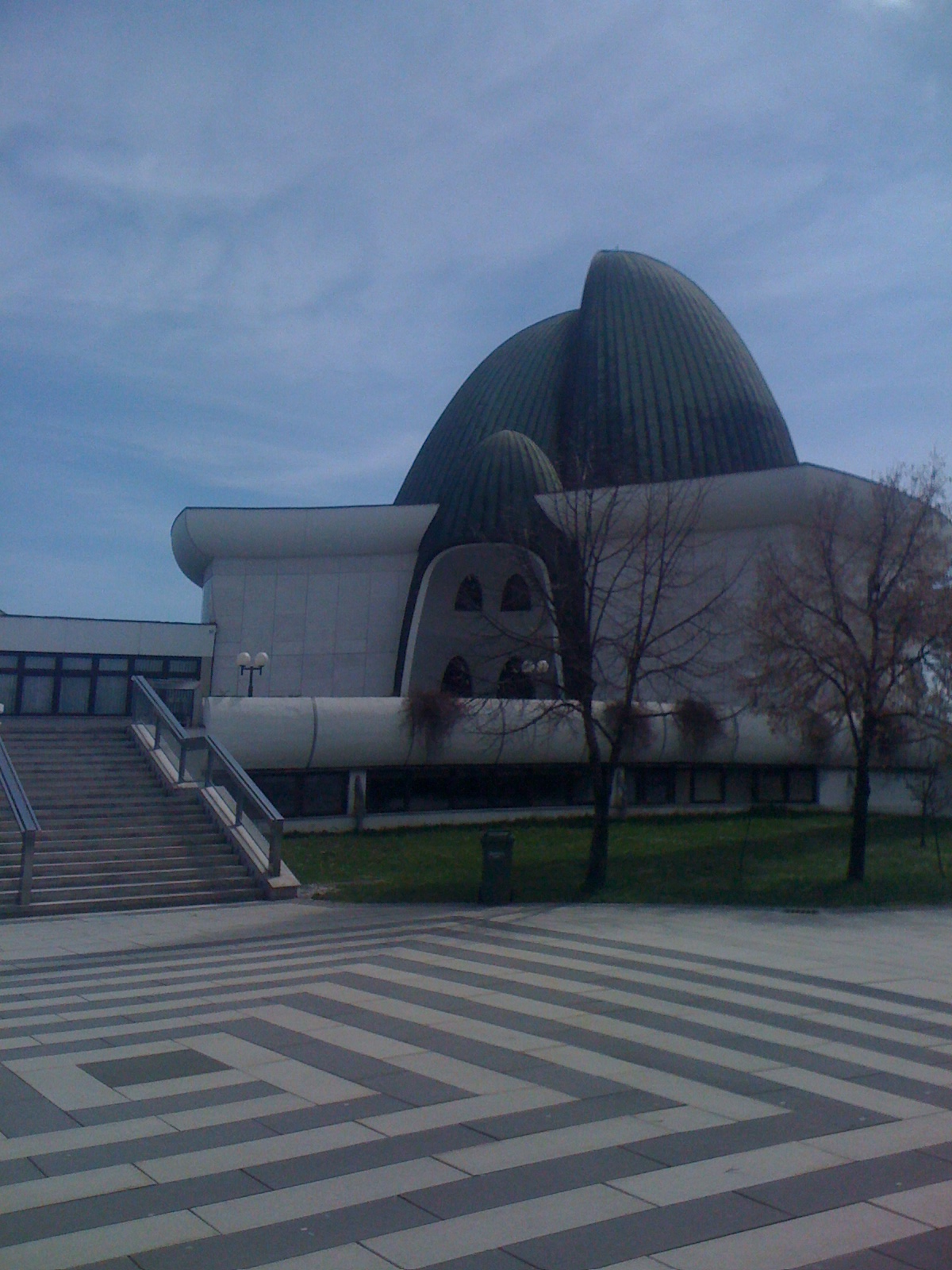

Location
- Zagreb; Croatia
- 45°47′31.0″N 16°00′41.7″E

Information
- Type: Private
- Established: 2007
- Campus: Urban
- Website: ss-drasmajlovic-zg.skole.hr

Dr. Ahmed Smajlović Islamic Secondary School (Croatian: Islamska gimnazija dr. Ahmed Smajlović) is a private secondary school (gymnasium) in Zagreb, Croatia. Classes are taught in Bosnian.

== See also ==
- Gymnasium (school)
- Secondary Education
- Education in Croatia
- Bosniaks of Croatia
- Islam in Croatia
- Kantakuzina Katarina Branković Serbian Orthodox Secondary School
- Italian Secondary School in Rijeka
