= Orahovica Gornja =

- Village
- Location within Bosnia and Herzegovina
- Country: Bosnia and Herzegovina
- Entity: Federation of Bosnia and Herzegovina
- Canton: Tuzla
- Municipality: Gračanica

Area
  - Total: 4.26 sq mi (11.03 km^{2})

Population (2013)
  - Total: 1,771
  - Density: 415.9/sq mi (160.6/km^{2})
- Time zone: UTC+1 (CET)
  - Summer (DST): UTC+2 (CEST)

Orahovica Gornja is a village in the municipality of Gračanica, Bosnia and Herzegovina.

== Demographics ==
According to the 2013 census, its population was 1,771.

Ethnicity in 2013
Ethnicity	Number	Percentage
Bosniaks	1,740	98.2%
Serbs	3	0.2%
other/undeclared	28	1.6%
Total	1,771	100%
