= Effendi =

Title of nobility

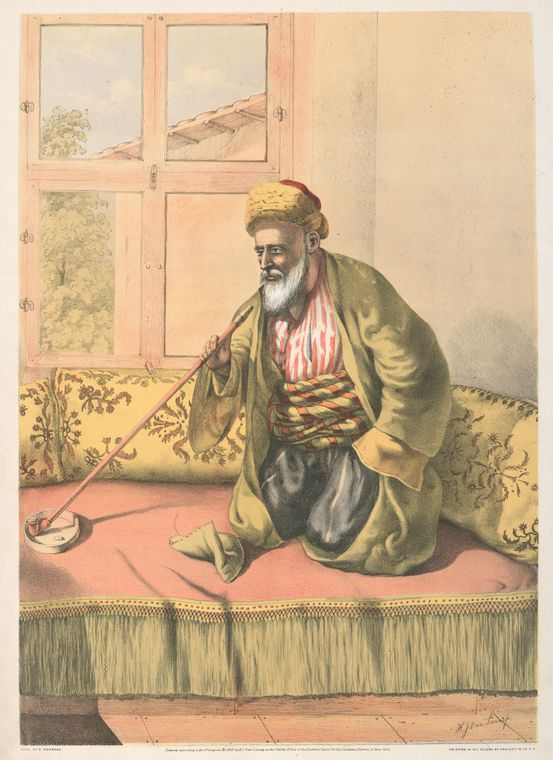
A Turkish Effendi (1862)

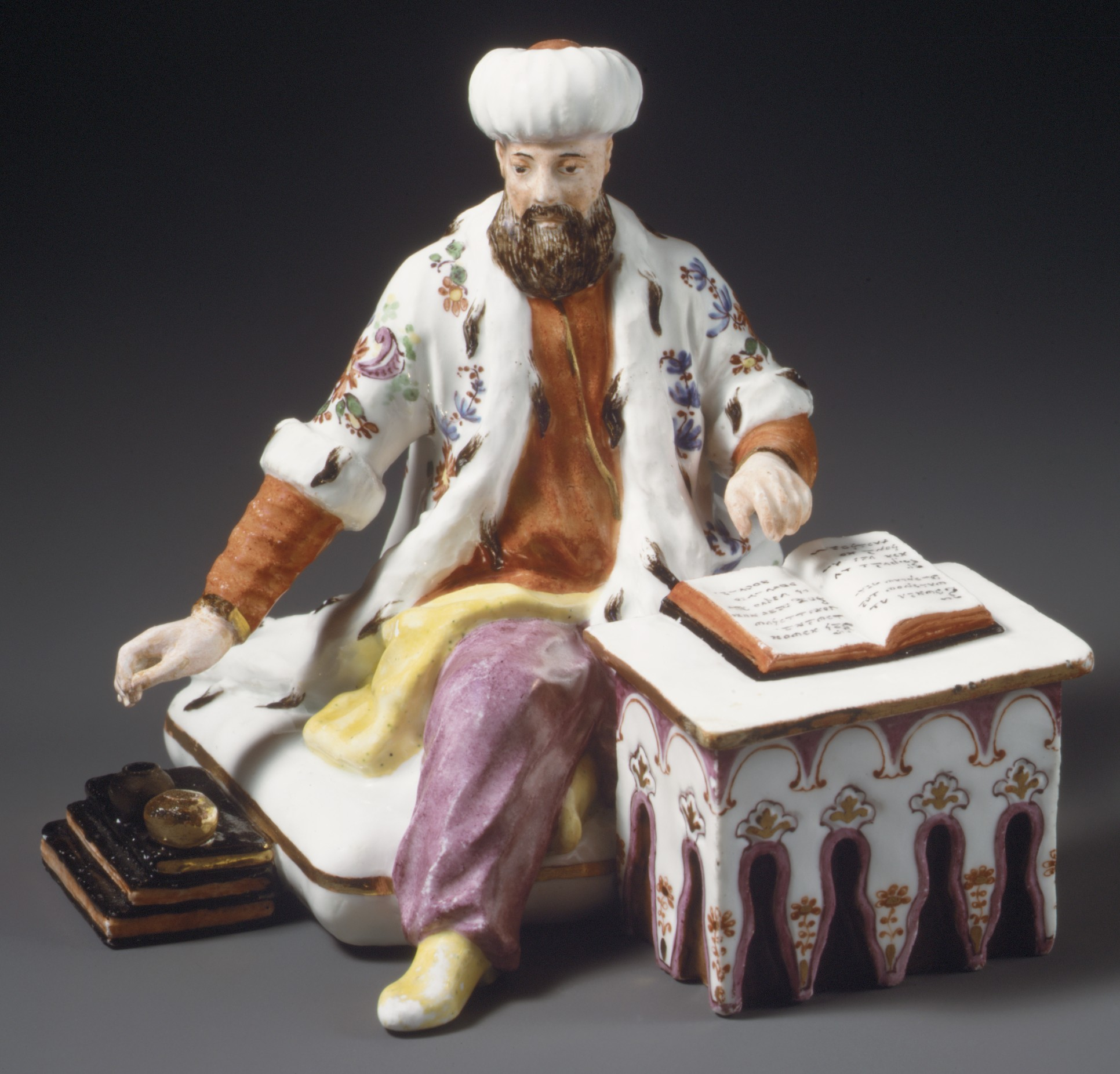
Figurine of an effendi, circa 1770, hard-paste porcelain, height: 10.8 cm, Metropolitan Museum of Art (New York City)

Effendi or effendy (Turkish: efendi [eˈfændi]; Ottoman Turkish: افندی, romanized: efendi; originally from Medieval Greek: ἀφέντης [aˈfendis]) is a title of nobility meaning sir, lord or master, especially in the Ottoman Empire and the Caucasus. The title itself and its other forms are originally derived from Medieval Greek aphentēs which is derived from Ancient Greek authentēs meaning lord.

It is a title of respect or courtesy, equivalent to the English Sir. It was used in the Ottoman Empire and Byzantine Empire. It follows the personal name, when it is used, and is generally given to members of the learned professions and to government officials of high rank, such as bey or pasha. It may also indicate a definite office, as hekim efendi, chief physician to the sultan. The possessive form efendim (my master) was formerly used by slaves, and is commonplace in formal discourse, when answering the telephone, and can substitute for "excuse me" in some situations (e.g. asking someone to repeat something).

In the Ottoman era, the most common title affixed to a personal name after that of agha was efendi. Such a title would have indicated an "educated gentleman", hence by implication a graduate of a secular state school (rüşdiye), even though at least some if not most of these efendis had once been religious students, or even religious teachers.

Lucy Mary Jane Garnett wrote in the 1904 work Turkish Life in Town and Country that Ottoman Christians, women, mullahs, sheiks, and princes of the Ottoman royal family could become effendi, a title carrying "the same significance as the French Monsieur" and which was one of two "merely conventional designations as indefinite as our 'Esquire' has come to be [in the United Kingdom]".

The Grand National Assembly of Turkey adopted modifications to the Surname Law and abolished the title in November 1934.

== Etymology ==
The Ottoman Turkish word افندی, in modern Turkish efendi, is a borrowing of the Medieval Greek αφέντης aféndēs, from Byzantine Greek ἀφέντης aphéntēs, from Ancient Greek αὐθέντης authéntēs, "master, author, doer, perpetrator" (from which authentic). The word was widely used as a Greek title for Byzantine nobles as late as 1465, such as in the letters of Cardinal Bessarion concerning the children of Thomas Paleologus.

== Other uses ==
- Effendi (Egyptian Arabic pronunciation: [æˈfændi]) was also considered a title for a man of high education or social standing in an eastern (Mediterranean or Middle Eastern) country. It was analogous to esquire and junior to bey in Egypt during the Muhammad Ali dynasty, and was widely used among Egyptians.
- Effendi is still used as an honorific in Egypt, Jordan, and Turkey (as well as some other former Ottoman states), and is the source of the word أفندم؟ afandim? (Turkish: efendim), a particularly polite way of saying "excuse me?", and can be used in answering the phone.
- The colonial military forces of British East Africa and German East Africa were built from a stock of Sudanese soldiers of the Egyptian army, which was nominally under the Ottoman Empire. These units entered East Africa with some officers who brought their title of effendi with them and, thus it continued to be used for non-European officers of the two colonial forces. Up to the present, the Swahili form afande is a way to address officers in the armies of Kenya, Tanzania and recently in Rwanda with the coming to power of RPF.
  - Effendi (Governor's Commissioned Officer) was the highest rank that African soldiers could reach in the King's African Rifles (KAR) and other British Colonial Auxiliary Forces units until 1961 (from then, promotions to commissioned officers became possible). They were equivalent to the Viceroy's Commissioned Officers in the British Indian Army. An Effendi's authority was confined to other KAR troops (askaris), and he could not command white troops. The KAR rank came into disuse during the 1930s and was reintroduced in 1956.
  - Effendi was also a non-European's officer rank in the Schutztruppe of German East Africa. Similar to the practice, Effendis were promoted by a governor's warrant, not by a kaiser's commission, as white commissioned officers were. Effendis had no authority over white troops. In the Schutztruppe this rank was used, together with other ranks of Ottoman origin like "Tschausch" (sergeant) and "Ombascha" (corporal). During the First World War askari NCOs were promoted to the rank of Effendi for exemplary service and leadership.
- In Bosnia and Herzegovina "Efendija" refers to Muslim clerics.
- In Indonesia and Malaysia, "Effendi" can be used as a masculine first name.
- In Pakistan and India, "Effendi" is the surname of some families whose ancestors migrated from Turkey or Afghanistan.
- In Afghanistan, some members of the former ruling Barakzai clan of Durranis also use "Effendi" or a variant "Affandi" as their surname.
- In China, "Effendi" (阿凡提) often refers to Nasreddin.
- Jazz pianist McCoy Tyner has one composition named "Effendi". It appears on his debut album, Inception.
- Shoghi Effendi, born Shoghí Rabbání, acquired the title from ʻAbdu'l-Bahá in his youth.

== See also ==
- Byzantine bureaucracy and aristocracy
- Ottoman titles
- Mustafa Sabri Efendi
