= Theatre of Serbia =

History and practice of theatre in Serbia

The theatre of Serbia (Serbian: Позориште у Србији, Pozorište u Srbiji) encompasses the history and practice of theatre in Serbia, from its earliest forms to contemporary productions. It has a rich tradition, significantly contributing to Serbian culture and national identity, with roots in medieval religious plays and folk traditions, and modern development beginning in the 19th century.

== History ==
=== Early forms and beginnings (until the 19th century) ===
The earliest forms of theatrical life on the territory of present-day Serbia can be traced to the Middle Ages through church ceremonies, folk games, and rituals that contained dramatic elements. Later, in the 18th century, under the influence of the Enlightenment, the first school plays emerged in Vojvodina (then part of the Habsburg monarchy), particularly in Sremski Karlovci and Novi Sad.

Serbian language theatre in the 1700s began with amateur school drama, with the first Traedokomedija, performed in 1734 in Sremski Karlovci. Under the influence of the Enlightenment, this era saw the establishment of the foundation for secular theatre, moving beyond earlier dramatic elements in folk traditions and church ceremonies. Soon, Imperial decrees (Maria Theresa and Joseph II) allowed for the creation of the first private, commercial theatres in the empire. These initial developments, which primarily took place in Serbian communities within the Habsburg Monarchy, were pioneered by individuals educated in Moscow, Kiev, St. Petersburg, Vienna, and other European cities. Emanuel Kozačinski, Jovan Rajić, Marko Jelisejić, Arkadije Pejić, and others laid the groundwork for a theatre scene in the 19th century and thereafter.

=== Establishment of modern theatre (19th century) ===
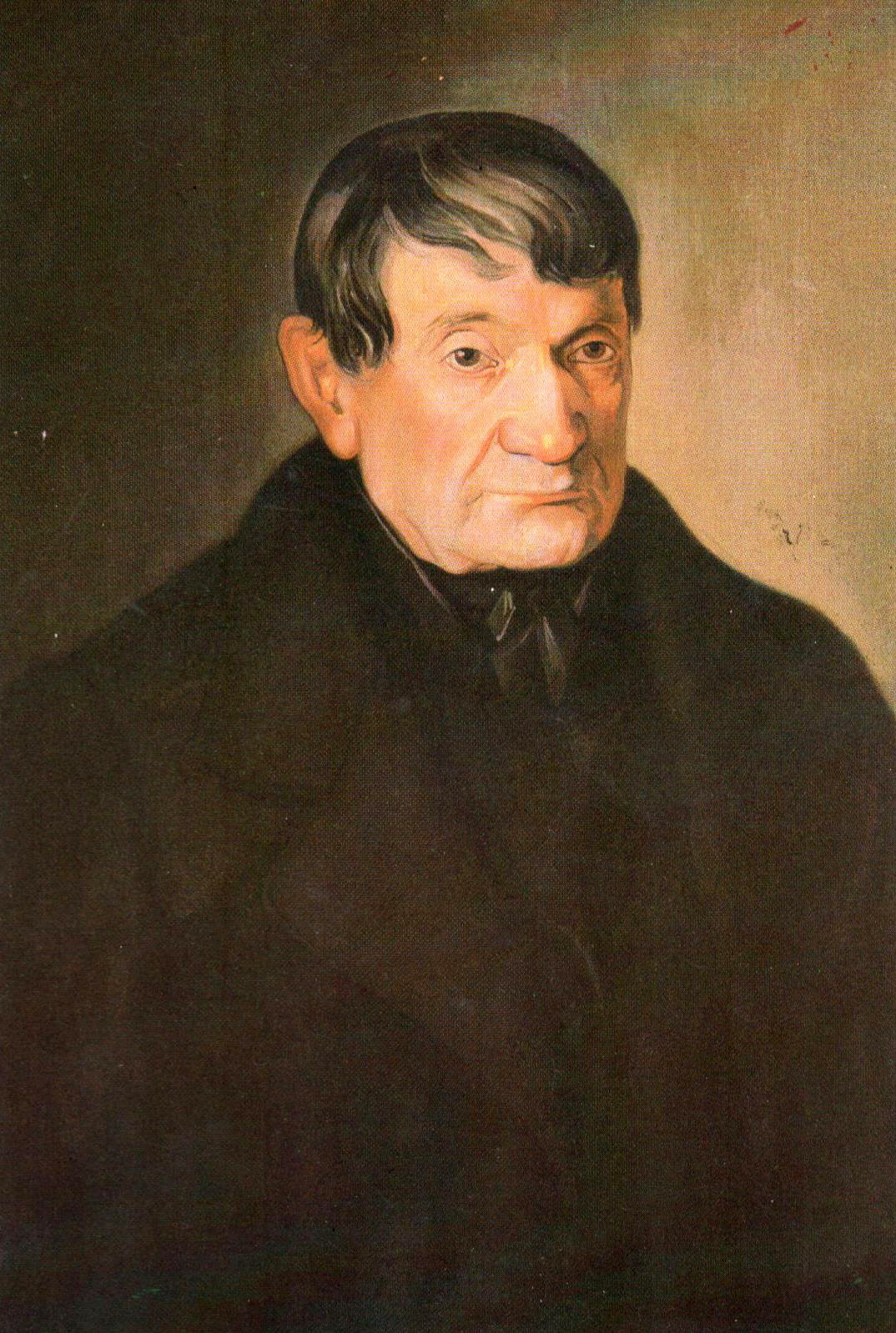
Joakim Vujić, considered the "father of Serbian theatre"

Modern Serbian theatre began to form in the 19th century, in parallel with the national awakening and the creation of the modern Serbian state.

- Joakim Vujić (1772–1848) is considered the "father of Serbian theatre". He organized the first theatrical performances in the Serbian language in the Austrian Empire (Pest, Szeged) and the Principality of Serbia. In 1835, in Kragujevac, he founded the Knjaževsko-srpski teatar (Princely-Serbian Theatre), the first permanent professional theatre in Serbia.
- The Serbian National Theatre in Novi Sad was founded in 1861 and is the oldest professional theatre among Serbs.
- The National Theatre in Belgrade was founded in 1868 and quickly became the central theatrical institution in the country.

The first Serbian playwrights who laid the foundations for Serbian drama were Jovan Sterija Popović (Kir Janja, The Patriots) and Kosta Trifković (The Chooser).

=== Theatre in the first half of the 20th century (until 1945) ===
At the beginning of the 20th century, Branislav Nušić became the most popular Serbian comedy writer (A Suspicious Person, The Cabinet Minister's Wife, A Member of Parliament, The Bereaved Family, Dr., The Deceased). During this period, influences of European Modernism and theatrical realism were felt in directing and acting. Besides Belgrade and Novi Sad, theatrical life also developed in other cities.

=== Theatre in socialist Yugoslavia (1945–1991) ===
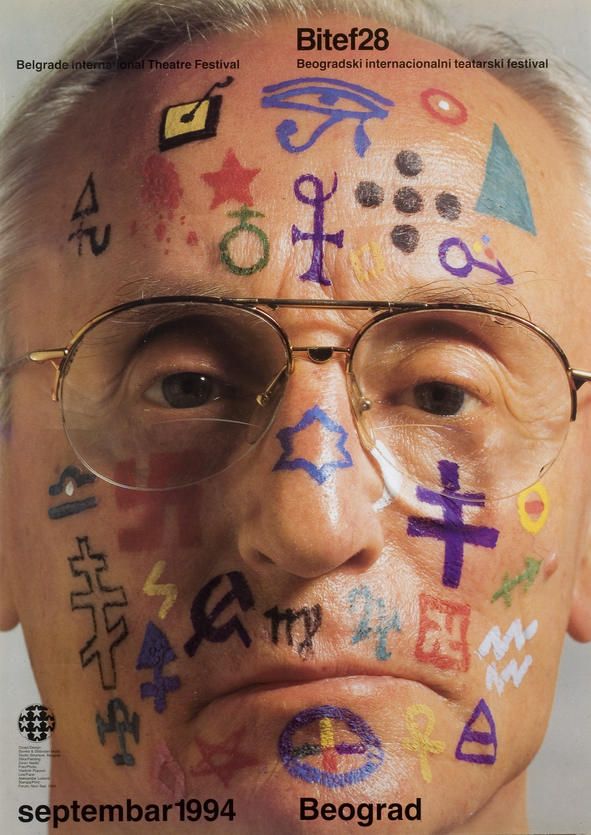
Poster for 28. BITEF 1994.

After World War II, within the Socialist Federal Republic of Yugoslavia (SFRY), numerous new theatres were established, and theatrical art saw significant development.

- New important theatres were founded, such as the Yugoslav Drama Theatre (1947) and Atelje 212 (1956) in Belgrade, which nurtured contemporary domestic and foreign repertoires.
- Modern theatre directing and acting developed. Prominent directors included Bojan Stupica, Mata Milošević, Mira Trailović, Ljubomir "Muci" Draškić, and Dejan Mijač.
- Significant theatre festivals were established:
  - The BITEF (Belgrade International Theatre Festival), founded in 1967, became one of the world's leading festivals of new theatrical tendencies.
  - Sterijino pozorje (Novi Sad), founded in 1956, became the central festival for domestic dramatic texts.
- Dramatic literature was enriched by writers such as Aleksandar Popović, Dušan Kovačević, and Ljubomir Simović.

=== Contemporary Serbian theatre (since 1991) ===
After the breakup of Yugoslavia, Serbian theatre continued to develop under new socio-political circumstances. New generations of playwrights, directors, and actors emerged. The independent theatre scene developed with numerous troupes and alternative spaces. Contemporary playwrights such as Biljana Srbljanović and Milena Marković gained international recognition. Existing festivals continued their work, and new ones promoting various theatrical forms were established.

== Playwriting ==
Serbian playwriting covers a wide range of genres and themes, from comedies and tragedies inspired by folk life and history to contemporary dramas dealing with social and existential issues. In addition to the classics (Sterija, Nušić), significant contributions were made by writers such as Aleksandar Popović (who introduced elements of absurdism and grotesque), Dušan Kovačević (known for his tragicomedies with fantastical elements), Ljubomir Simović (with his poetic dramas), Slobodan Selenić, Vida Ognjenović, and Biljana Srbljanović.

== Directing ==
Serbian theatre directing has followed the development of European directing schools and approaches. From realistic productions at the beginning of the 20th century, through modernist experiments, to contemporary postdramatic and interdisciplinary approaches. Notable directors who have shaped Serbian theatre include Bojan Stupica (known for visually rich and imaginative productions), Mata Milošević (founder of modern acting pedagogy), Mira Trailović (founder of Atelje 212 and BITEF), Jovan Ćirilov (long-time artistic director of BITEF), Dejan Mijač (known for psychologically profound stagings of classics), Ljubomir "Muci" Draškić, Egon Savin, Nikita Milivojević, and Kokan Mladenović.

== Acting ==
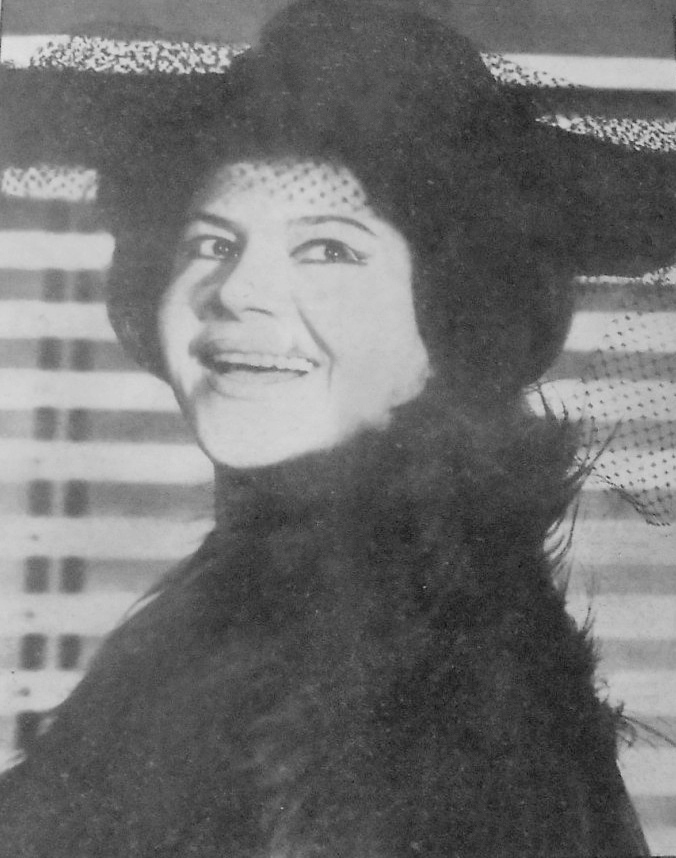
Mira Stupica, renown Yugoslavian actress

Serbian theatre has produced a large number of exceptional actors who have marked different eras with their creations. From legends of the early 20th century such as Čiča Ilija Stanojević, Žanka Stokić, and Dobrica Milutinović (after whom the prestigious Dobrica's Ring acting award is named), to the greats of the post-war period like Mira Stupica, Ljuba Tadić, Zoran Radmilović, Pavle Vujisić, Mija Aleksić, and Danilo "Bata" Stojković, and numerous prominent actors of middle and younger generations. Actor training takes place at the Faculty of Dramatic Arts in Belgrade, the Academy of Arts in Novi Sad, and other institutions.

== Notable theatres ==
In addition to the national theatres in Belgrade and Novi Sad, the Yugoslav Drama Theatre, and Atelje 212, other significant theatres in Serbia include:

- Belgrade Drama Theatre
- Zvezdara Theatre (Belgrade)
- Terazije Theatre (Belgrade, specializing in musicals and operettas)
- Duško Radović Little Theatre (Belgrade, children's theatre)
- Boško Buha Theatre (Belgrade, children's theatre)
- Bitef Theatre (Belgrade)
- National theatres in Niš, Subotica, Sombor, Užice, and other professional theatres across the country.

== Theatre festivals ==
Serbia hosts a large number of national and international theatre festivals. Besides BITEF and Sterijino pozorje, some of the most significant are:

- Days of Comedy (Dani komedije) in Jagodina
- Joakimfest and JoakimInterFest in Kragujevac
- Festival of Professional Theatres of Serbia "Joakim Vujić" (a festival for theatres south of Belgrade)
- Festival of Professional Theatres of Vojvodina
- Zoran Radmilović Days (Dani Zorana Radmilovića) in Zaječar
- Festival of Monodrama and Pantomime in Zemun
- International Festival of Children's Theatres in Subotica

== See also ==
- Culture of Serbia
- Serbian literature
- History of theatre
- List of theatres in Serbia
- List of Serbian actors
- Cinema of Serbia
