= Branislava Ilić =

Serbian playwright, dramaturge and screenwriter

- Born: 1970 (age 54–55); Niš, Serbia, SFR Yugoslavia
- Education: Faculty of Dramatic Arts, Belgrade
- Occupation: Playwright

Branislava Ilić (Niš, 1970), is a playwright, dramaturge, screenwriter, actress and prose writer from Serbia.

== Biography ==
Branislava attended the Secondary Acting School in Niš. She obtained her dramaturgy degree at the Faculty of Dramatic Arts in Belgrade. Her first professional engagement took place in the National Theater in Niš.

For three years she worked as a dramaturge at the National Theater in Belgrade (2008-2010). She has also collaborated at performances at the Serbian National Theater in Novi Sad, Atelje 212 in Belgrade, "Toša Jovanović" Theater in Zrenjanin, Kruševac Theater, Puls Theater in Lazarevac, Zvezdara Teatar in Belgrade, Madlenianum in Zemun, Croatian National Theater "Ivan pl. Zajc" in Rijeka, Bitef Theater in Belgrade, OP DADOV in Belgrade.

Her short stories and dramas are published in magazines and collections. Dozens of her radio dramatic miniatures are produced as well as several screenplays for different TV formats.

She is also a member of the Sterijino pozorje jury. Selector of the Joakimfest 2021.

== Works ==
Books of plays

- Teatar palanke /A Theater of the provinciality/, Niš Cultural Center, Niš, 2007.
- Baba, neću da postanem čudovište /Grandma, I will not become a monster/, City Library "Žarko Zrenjanin" and NP "Toša Jovanović" from Zrenjanin, 2015.
- Zaglavljeni /Stuck/, based on motives of the novel Zajedno sami /Together alone/ by Marko Šelić Marčelo, OP DADOV 2010; Beoštampa 2012; Laguna 2015.
- Drame / Plays, bilingual edition, Srpska čitaonica Irig and the Borislav Mihajlović Mihiz Foundation, 2017.

Produced theatrical plays (selection)

- Ulica, štap i kanap /Street, rod and rope/ (directed by the author);
- Zločin i razgovori /Crime and Conversations/ (directed by K. Mladenović);
- Zaglavljeni /Stuck/ (directed by D. Mihajlović);
- Telo /The Body/ (directed by S. Bodroža);
- Baba, neću da postanem čudovište /Grandma, I don't want to become a monster/ (directed by P. Štrbac);
- Ne pristajem /I do not comply/ (directed by K. Krnajski);
- Pad /The Fall/ (co-authors: B. Ilić / K. Mladenović).

Performances with dramaturgy contribution (selection)

- Ludi od ljubavi /Fool for Love/, Sam Shepard;
- Noževi u kokoškama /Knives in hens/, D. Harrower;
- Odabrani i uništeni /Chosen and Destroyed/, I. Jovanović / D. Petković / M. Todorović;
- Vitamini /Vitamins/, V. Jon;
- Derviš i smrt /Death and the Dervish/, М. Selimović / B. M. Mihiz / E. Savin;
- Nova stradija /New Stradija/, S. Basara;
- Životinjsko carstvo /The animal kingdom/, R. Schimmelpfennig;
- Zoran Đinđić, O. Frljić;
- Don Kihot / Don Quixote/, M. de Servantes;
- Čarobna frula /The Magic Flute/ (opera for children), W. A. Mozart
- Pad /The fall/, B. Ilić / K. Mladenović.

== Awards and recognitions (selection) ==
- "Jovan Sterija Popović" Award for drama "The Body" — Sterijino pozorje New Drama competition;
- Award "Borislav Mihajlović Mihiz" for dramatic opus;
- Annual Prize of the National Theater Belgrade (as a member of dramaturge team);
