= Joakimfest =

Annual international theatre festival held in Kragujevac, Serbia

Coordinates: 44°00′38″N 20°54′37″E

- Јоакимфест; Joakimfest
- JoakimInterFest

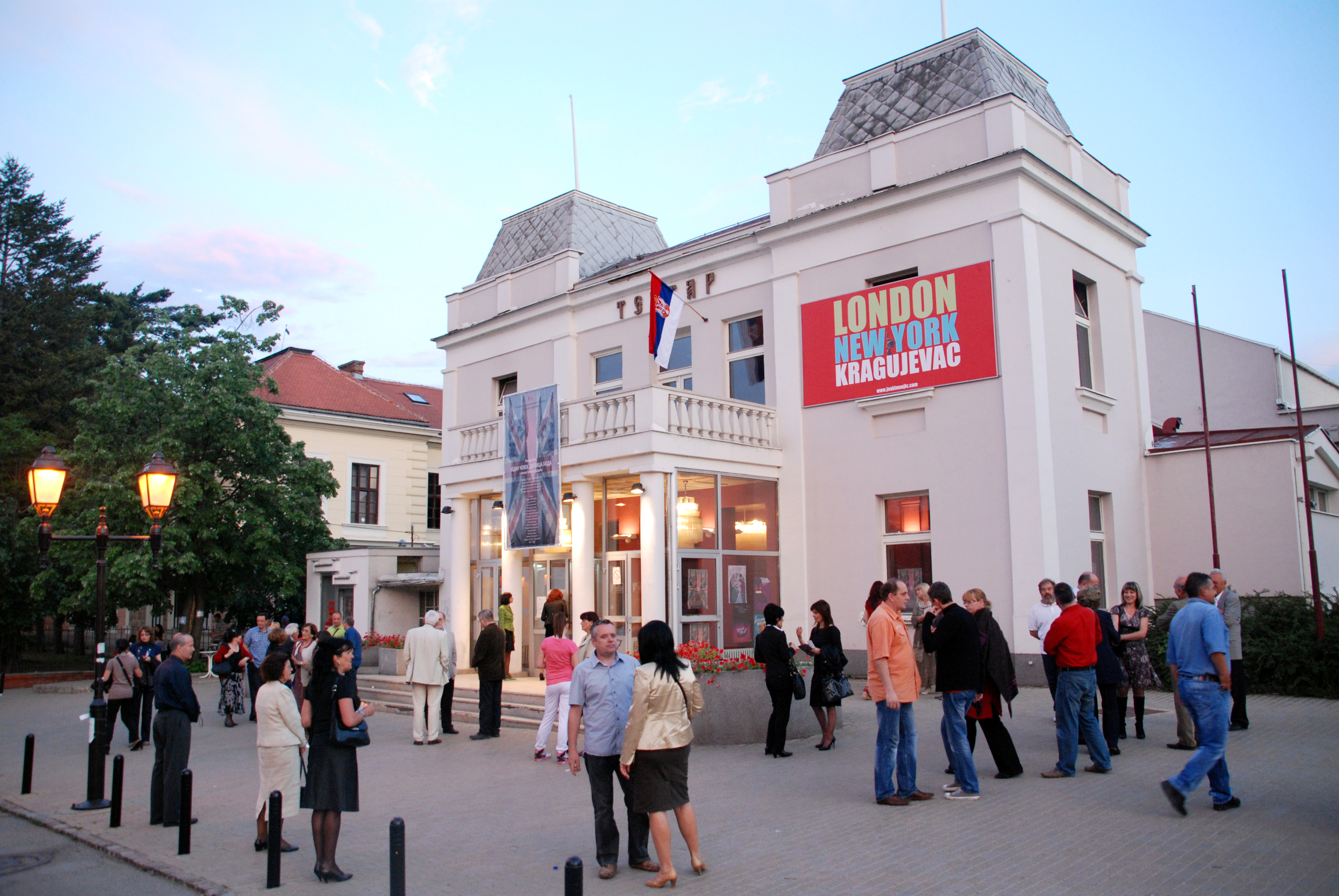
- Interactive map of Joakimfest
- Address: Daničićeva 3 City of Kragujevac; Serbia
- Type: Theatrical

Construction
- Opened: 7 October 2006; 19 years ago

Website
- joakimfest.rs

Joakimfest is an annual international theatre festival held in Kragujevac, Serbia, at the Princely Serbian Theatre in the second week of October each year.

== About festival ==
The International Theatre Festival - JoakimInterFest, was named after one of the most important personalities of the Serbian theatre, Joakim Vujić (1772–1847). A writer, comedian, translator, traveler and general manager of the first Serbian theatre founded in Kragujevac, the then capital of Serbia in 1835, Joakim Vujić is at the same time the most controversial and intriguing figure in Serbian theatre history. His libertarian spirit, an impressive number of works, which he left as a legacy and everything he did for the beginnings of the development of organized theatrical life in Serbia, brought him the epithet of "the father of Serbian theatre".

JoakimInterFest was founded in 2006 on the initiative of the then general manager of the Princely-Serbian Theatre, director Dragan Jakovljević, and with great understanding and support from the City of Kragujevac. The then administrations of the theatre and the City of Kragujevac respectively, recognized the need for an international theatre festival that would improve theatre life in this area, and provide loyal Kragujevac audience and employees of this theatre with insight and information into new theatre trends. Thus, the Princely-Serbian Theatre, with its significant tradition, has become the initiator of a more than necessary theatrical exchange, which intensified that segment of theatrical life in this part of Serbia, south of Belgrade.

With the significant help of the theatrologist and critic Dragana Bošković, Dragan Jakovljević performed the curation until 2011. Since 2012, curators (as well as artistic directors) have been elected for at least two years. Goran Cvetković (2012–2014), Željko Jovanović (2015 and 2016), Miloš Latinović (2017 and 2018) and Slobodan Savić (2019 and 2020) made a significant contribution to the festival with their curations. At the beginning of 2019, with the election of the critic Slobodan Savić to the position of the curator and artistic director, the festival changed its name to Joakimfest (2020), and curator Savić advocated the concept of greater international recognition. Unfortunately, the situation with the Covid-19 virus pandemic prevented him from fully realizing all his ideas and plans.

Joakimfest is a festival of contemporary, modern, aesthetically, thematically and poetically referential theatre, which, through the selection of performances, strives to be visible not only in the local community but also in the wider region. Joakimfest celebrates and nurtures an aesthetically sophisticated, socially responsible, subversive and emancipatory theatre that tackles burning issues and phenomena of the time and the world in which we live.

Since the founding of the festival until today, over 140 performances from 25 countries of the world have been performed at Joakimfest, in which more than 700 theatre creators have participated. All these years, the festival has been following with equal attention both well-known authors of the international and domestic theatre scene, as well as those young theatre creators who receive support and the possibility of their wider artistic affirmation at the Joakimfest in Kragujevac. The three-member international jury awards two prizes at the festival: the Grand Prix "Joakim Vujić" for the best overall performance and the Special Award of the City of Kragujevac.

The host and organizer of the festival is the Princely-Serbian Theatre, and the main sponsor is the City of Kragujevac.

== Awards ==
- Grand prix Joakim Vujić, for the best overall performance
- Special Award of the City of Kragujevac

== Best Play award winners ==
1. 2006 – Galefyrsten written by Henning Mankell and directed by Marc van der Velden, from the Little Theatre Duško Radović from Belgrade
2. 2007 – The Governments Inspector written by Nikolai Gogol, directed by Horatiu Malaele and performed by Comedy Theatre from Bucharest
3. 2008 – Ćeif written by Mirza Fehimovic and directed by Egon Savin in the production of The Belgrade Drama Theatre from Belgrade, Serbia
4. 2009 – The Cherry Orchard written by Anton Chekhov and directed by Aleksandar Dunđerović, Theatre Kolectiv, Manchester-London, England
5. 2010 – Midsummer Night's Dream written by William Shakespeare and directed by Zoltan Puskas, performed by Ujvideki Szinhaz from Novi Sad
6. 2011 – Red written by Orhan Pamuk and directed by Martin Kočovski – which shows tension of New European Theatre Action
7. 2012 – Marat The Sade written by Peter Weiss and directed by Andraš Urban, performed by Ujvideki sinhaz / Novosadsko pozorište
8. 2013 – Grebanje Ili Kako Se Ubila Moja Baka written by Tanja Šljivar and directed by Selma Spahić, performed by BNP Zenica
9. 2014 – Our Class written by Tadeuš Slobođanek and directed by Vladimir Milčin, performed by Teatar za deca i mladinci Skopje
10. 2015 – Kainov ožiljak written by Vladimir Kecmanović i Dejan Stojiljković and directed by Jug Radivojević, performed by Šabac Theater .
11. 2016 – We Are The People Our Parents Warned Us About written by Tanja Šljivar and directed by Mirjana Karanović, performed by BNP Zenica.
12. 2017 – Shakespeare, sonnet 66 written by William Shakespeare and directed by Kokan Mladenović, performed by Timișoara State Csiky Gergely Theater.
13. 2018 – Constitution of the Republic of Croatia written by Ante Tomić and Rajko Grlić and directed by Vinko Brešan, performed by Satirical Theatre Kerempuh, Zagreb.
14. 2019 – MEDEA’S BOYS Loosely based on Euripides’ drama and directed by Andrei Măjeri, performed by Apollo 111, Bucharest, Romania.
15. 2020 – Why Does Mr. R. Run Amok? directed by Bobo Jelčić, Yugoslav Drama Theatre, Belgrade, Serbia.
16. 2021 – They Shoot Horses, Don’t They? the National Theatre from Bitola (North Macedonia)
17. 2022 - Consent directed by Nebojša Bradić, Atelje 212, Serbia.
18. 2023 – Why are You Sleeping on the Floor directed by Kokan Mladenović, performed by Serbian National Theatre Novi Sad, City Drama Theatre "Gavella", National Theatre Sarajevo and MESS (BiH, Serbia, Croatia).
19. 2024 - The Bald Soprano directed by Jagoš Marković, performed by Culture Centre Tivat (Montenegro).
20. 2025 - My theater, concept and direction by Boris Liješević, performed by Atelje 212 (Serbia)

== Gallery ==
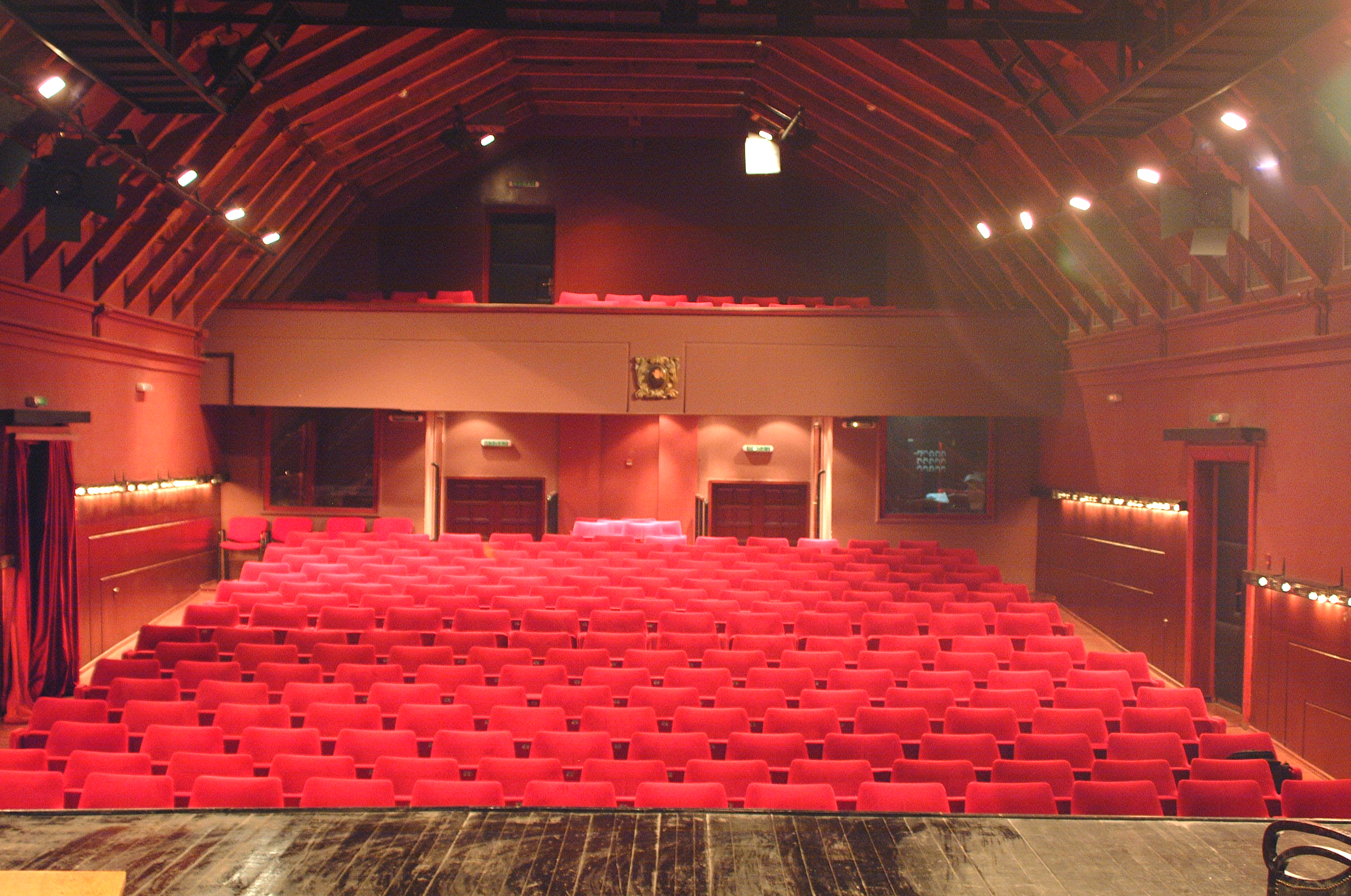
Stage Joakim Vujić

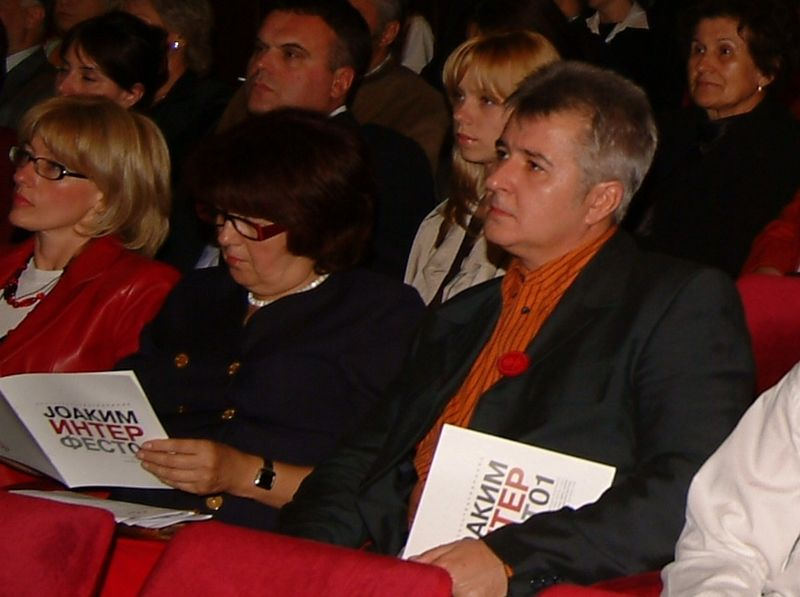
First Joakimfest 2006, Dragana Bošković and Slobodan Savić

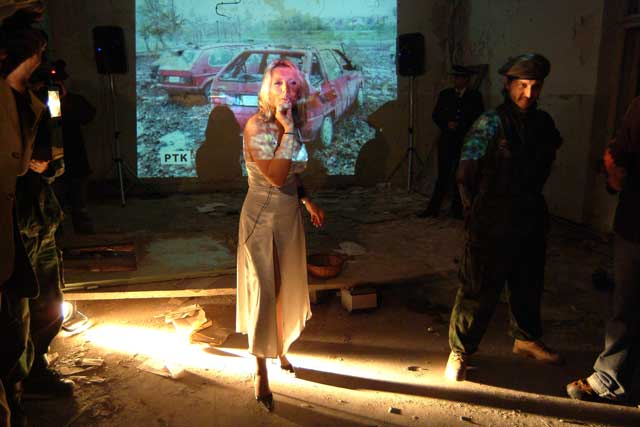
JoakimFest 2006, The Trial of Harold Pinter

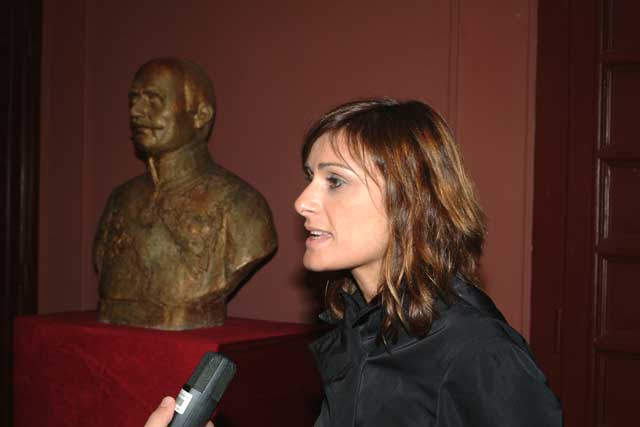
JoakimInterFest 2007, Biljana Srbljanović

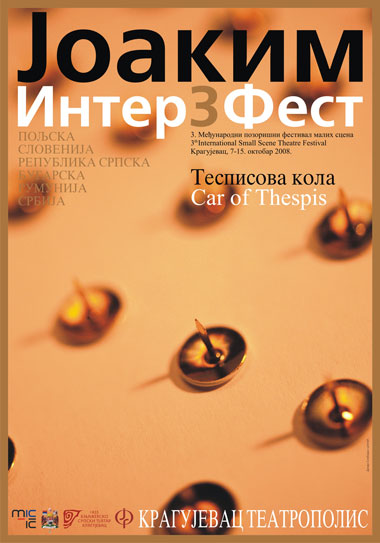
Joakimfest 2008

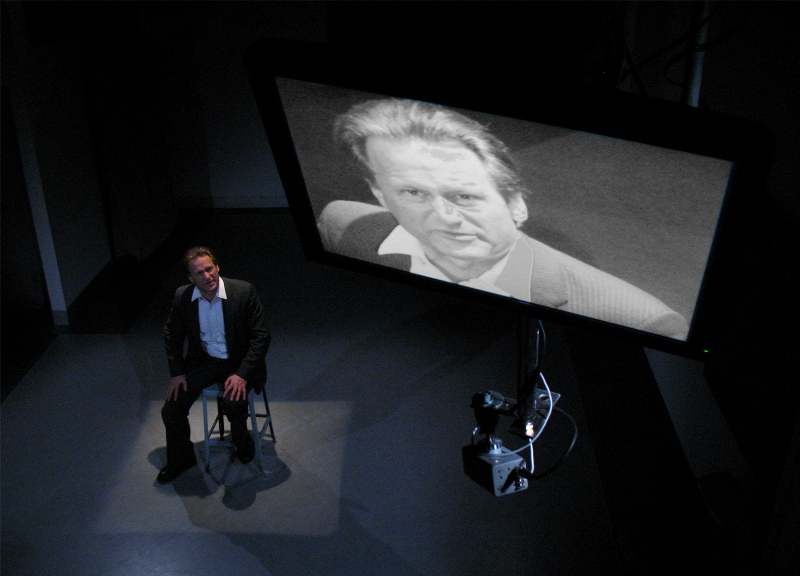
Joakimfest 2009

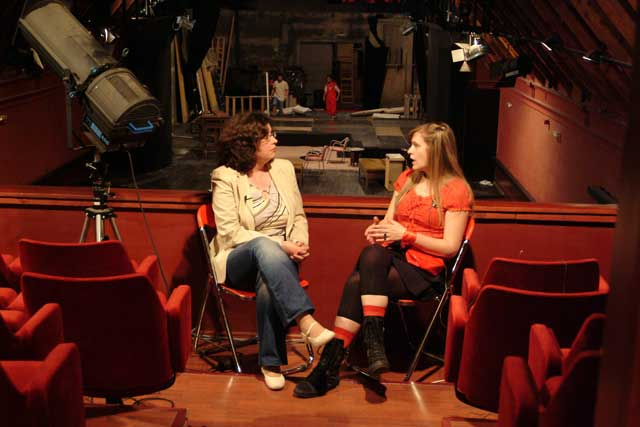
Press Joakimfest 2009

== See also ==
- List of theatre festivals
