= Slobodan Savić =

Serbian writer (born 1964)

Slobodan Savić Слободан Савић
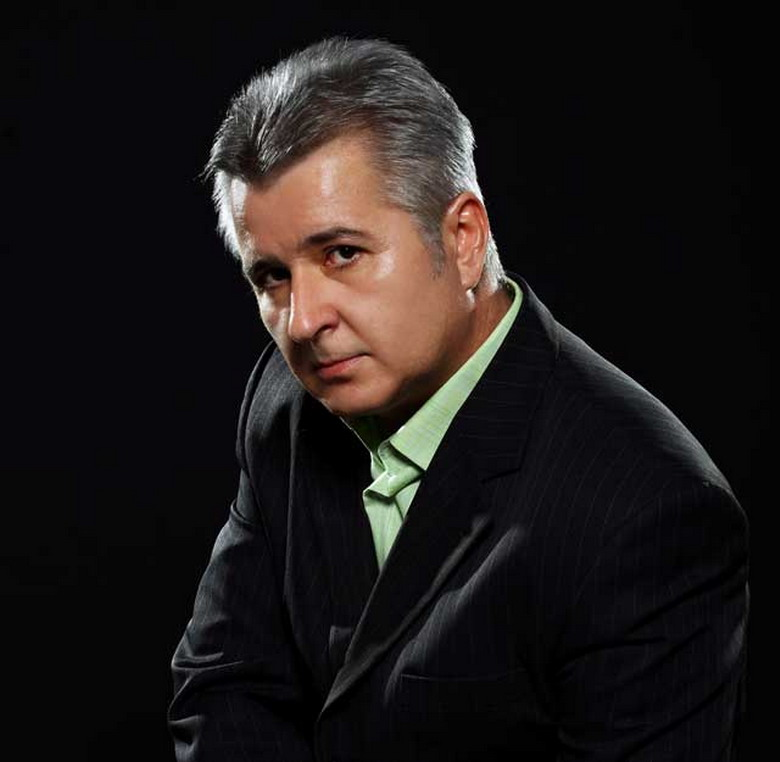
- Sterija Award for theater criticism in 2021
- Born: January 10, 1964 (age 62); Požarevac, Socialist Republic of Serbia
- Occupations: Writer, including journalist, screenwriter, and theatre critic

Slobodan Savić (born in 1964) is a Serbian writer, including journalist, screenwriter, and theatre critic.

== Early life and education ==
Savić was born at Požarevac and grew up at Kostolac.

He graduated with a degree in literature and the theory of literature from the University of Belgrade Faculty of Philology.

== Career ==
Savić's reviews and short prose works have been published in Student, Vidici, the literary magazine Književna reč, Književne novine, Književni list, literary almanacs, emitted in radio and television programmes; his columns have been published in leading journals and periodicals in the country.

He has been an editor and editor-in-chief of a cultural programme on Radio Belgrade 2 for many years, and the author and mediator of the cult talk show Radio parliament (that was cancelled for "political incorrectness" in 1995).

Savić was editor of the literary journal Znak, literary editor of the magazine Profil, columnist and editor of culture of the daily newspaper Glas javnosti.

He was awarded by the journal Vidici and the winner of an annual award of Radio Television Belgrade.

Savić is a screenwriter of numerous documentary television films and series.

He has been the editor in the Department of Cultural and Artistic programme on Serbian Radio Television (Serbian Broadcasting Corporation, Belgrade).

Savić was the initiator and writer of the television series Reading of the Theater.

He is a member of the Association of Theatre Critics of Serbia (ITCA).

== Personal life ==
Savić has lived and worked in Belgrade for many years.

== Awards ==
- Sterijino pozorje, Sterija Award for theater criticism in 2021, Novi Sad, 2021.

== Works ==
- Kratka svetska priča (Short Stories Worldwide), selection of stories, publisher Braničevo, Požarevac, 1989)
- Zbog njih su mnogi gubili glavu (Many were crazy about them), publisher Evro, Belgrade, 2000
- Istočno i zapadno od raja (East and West from Eden), publisher Laguna, Belgrade, 2007
- Biljana Srbljanović, porodične i druge priče (Biljana Srbljanovic, family and other tales), publisher Knjaževsko-srpski teatar, City of Kragujevac, 2008

== Selections from the television series Reading of the Theater ==
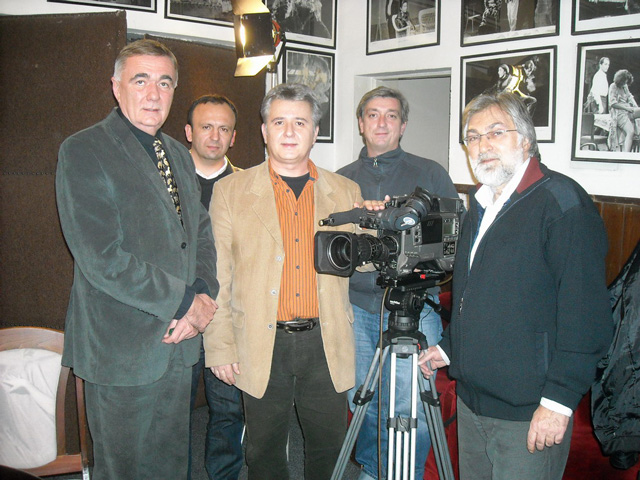
Dušan Kovačević and production team of TV series Reading of the Theater

TV series Reading of the Theater

- Novi pozorišni poredak (35 years of BITEF)
- Izgon iz komunističkog raja (Aleksandar Popović)
- Režija i angažman (Thomas Ostermeier)
- Amadeus režije (Jagoš Marković)
- Pozorište kao utočište (Goran Marković)
- Kroz istoriju i pozorište Srbije
- Porodične i druge priče, (Biljana Srbljanović)
- Život nije bajka (Milena Marković)
- Pozorište u dosluhu s vremenom (Egon Savin)
- Pozorište kao ogledalo istorije (Vida Ognjenović)
- Nepodnošljiva lakoća režije (Jerzy Mencl)

== Gallery ==
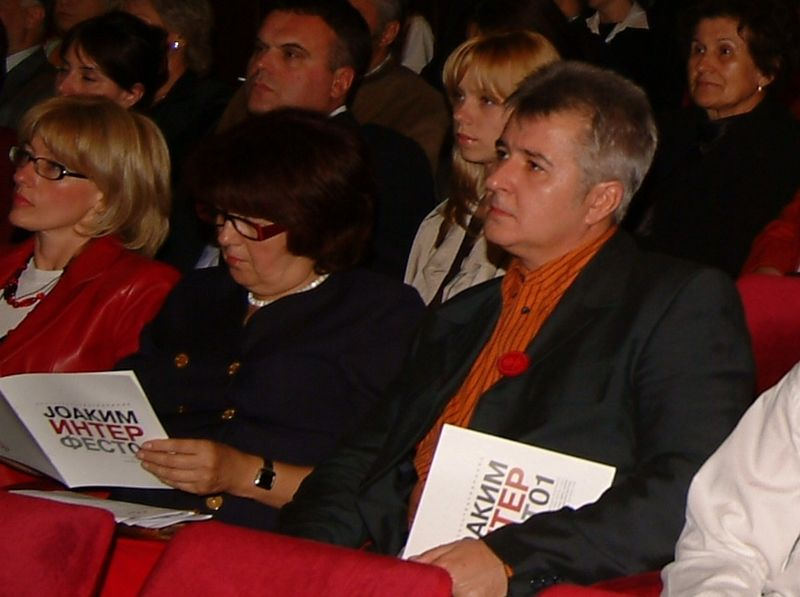
First JoakimInterFest 2006.

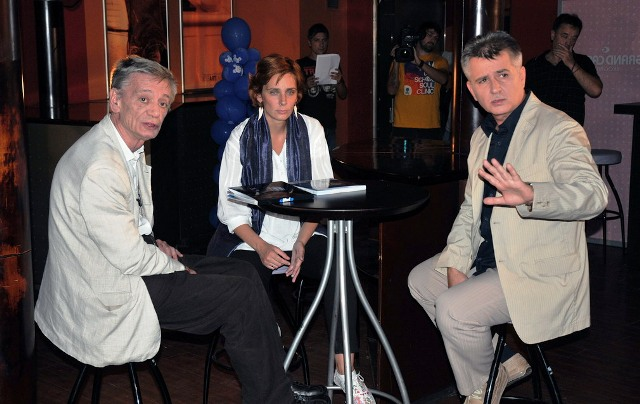
Jovan Ćirilov, Anja Suša i Slobodan Savić, BITEF 2009.

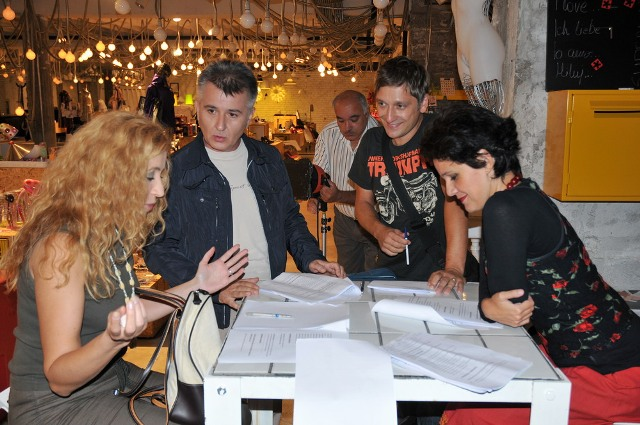
Belgrade International Theater Festival 2009.

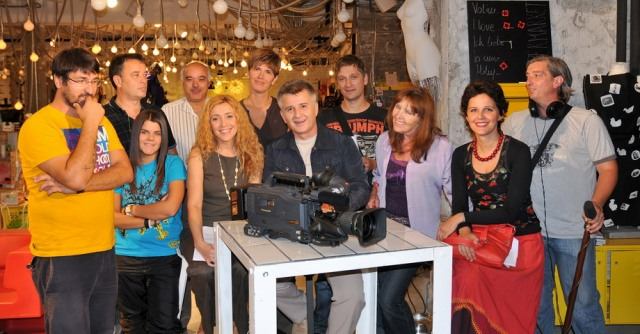
Belgrade International Theater Festival 2009.

== See also ==
- List of people from Belgrade
- List of Serbian writers
