= Princely Serbian Theatre =

Theatre in Kragujevac, Serbia

Coordinates: 44°00′38″N 20°54′37″E

- Књажевско-српски театар Knjaževsko-srpski teatar
- Joakim Vujić Theatre
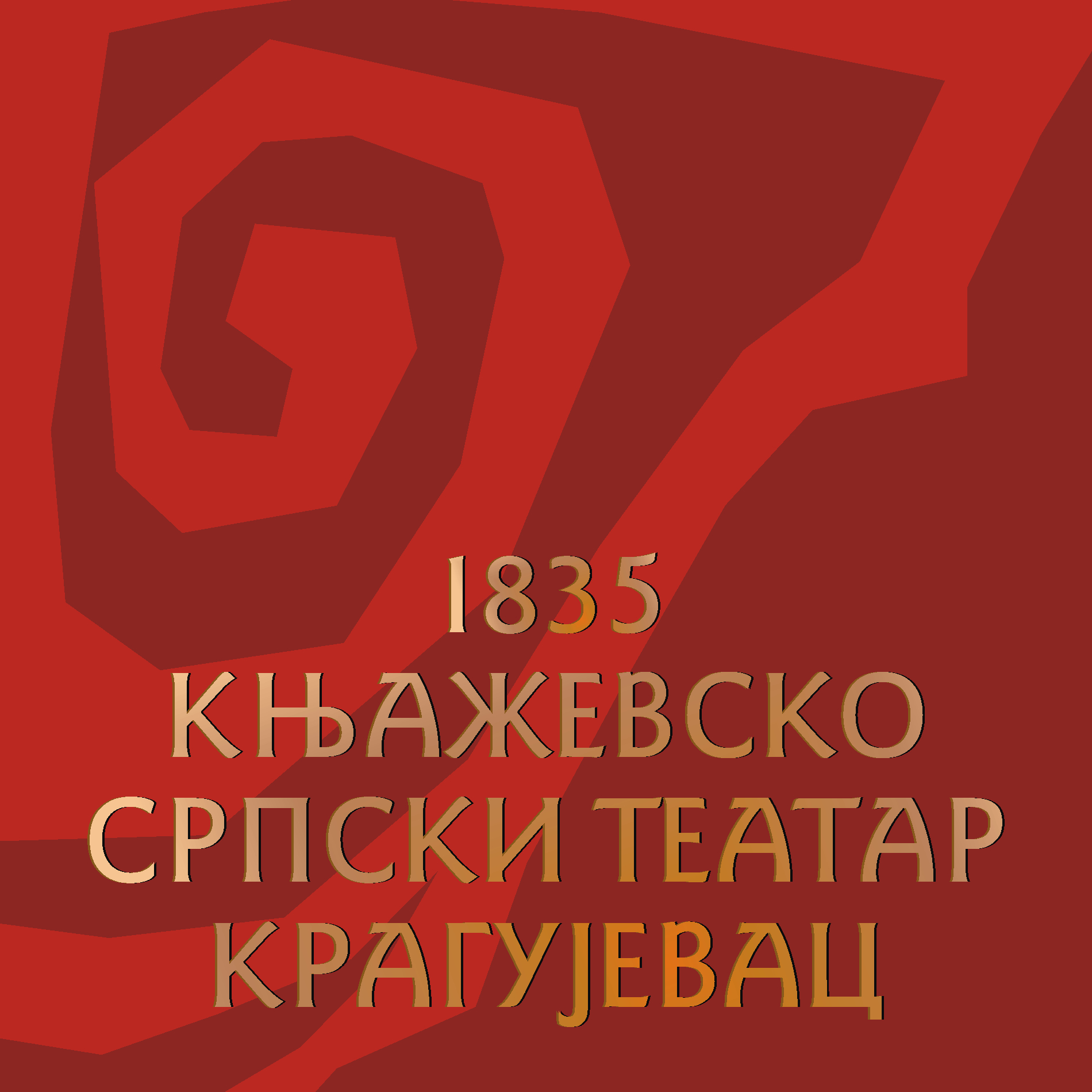
- Flag of Princely Serbian Theatre

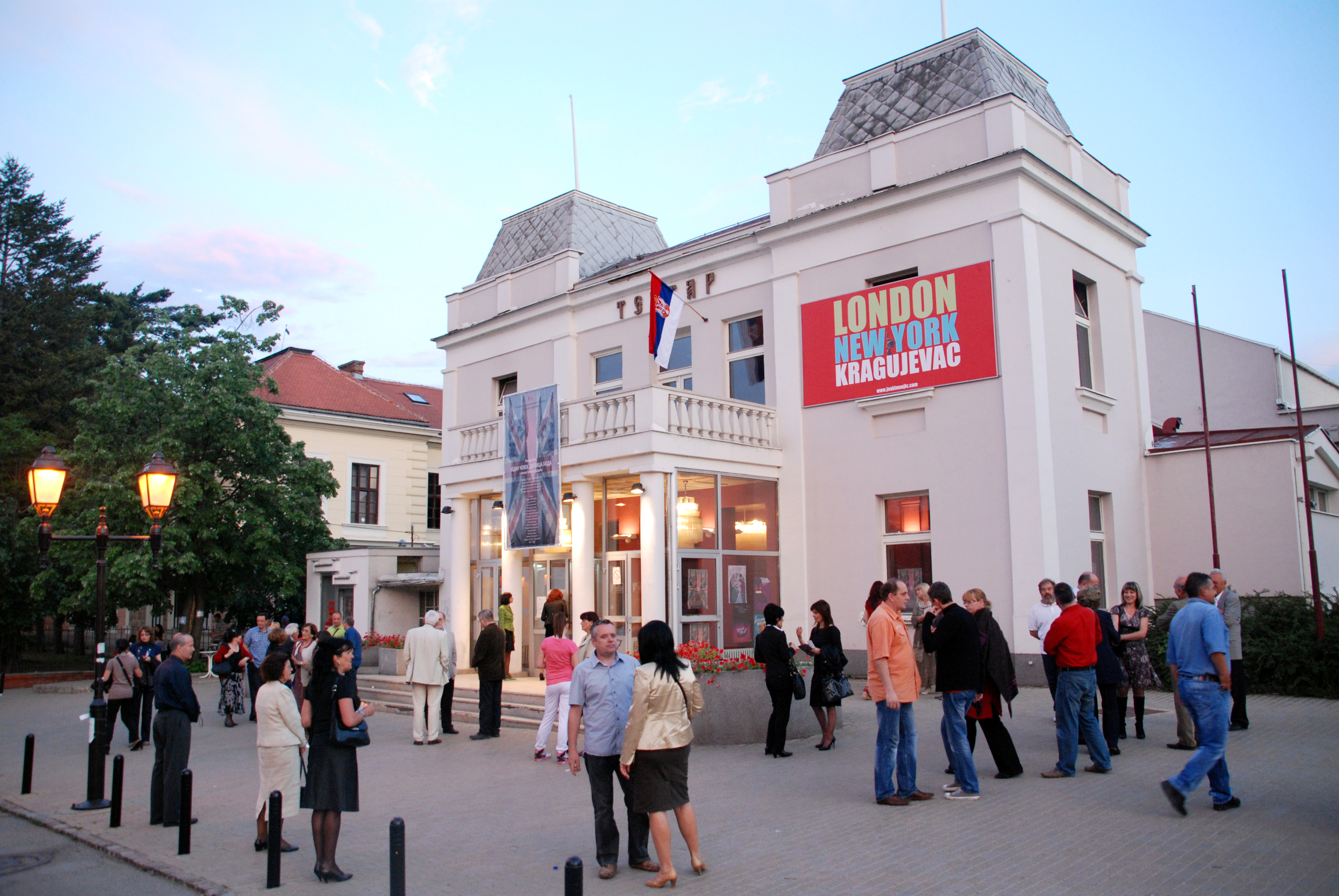
- Interactive map of Princely Serbian Theatre
- Address: Daničićeva 3 Kragujevac; Serbia

Construction
- Opened: 15 February 1835; 191 years ago

Website
- www.joakimvujic.com

The Princely Serbian Theatre (Serbian Cyrillic: Књажевско-српски театар) is the oldest Serbian theatre. It is based in Kragujevac, Serbia. The theatre was founded in 1835 by Miloš Obrenović, Prince of Serbia. In the time when theatre was founded, Kragujevac was the first capital of the Principality of Serbia.

== History ==
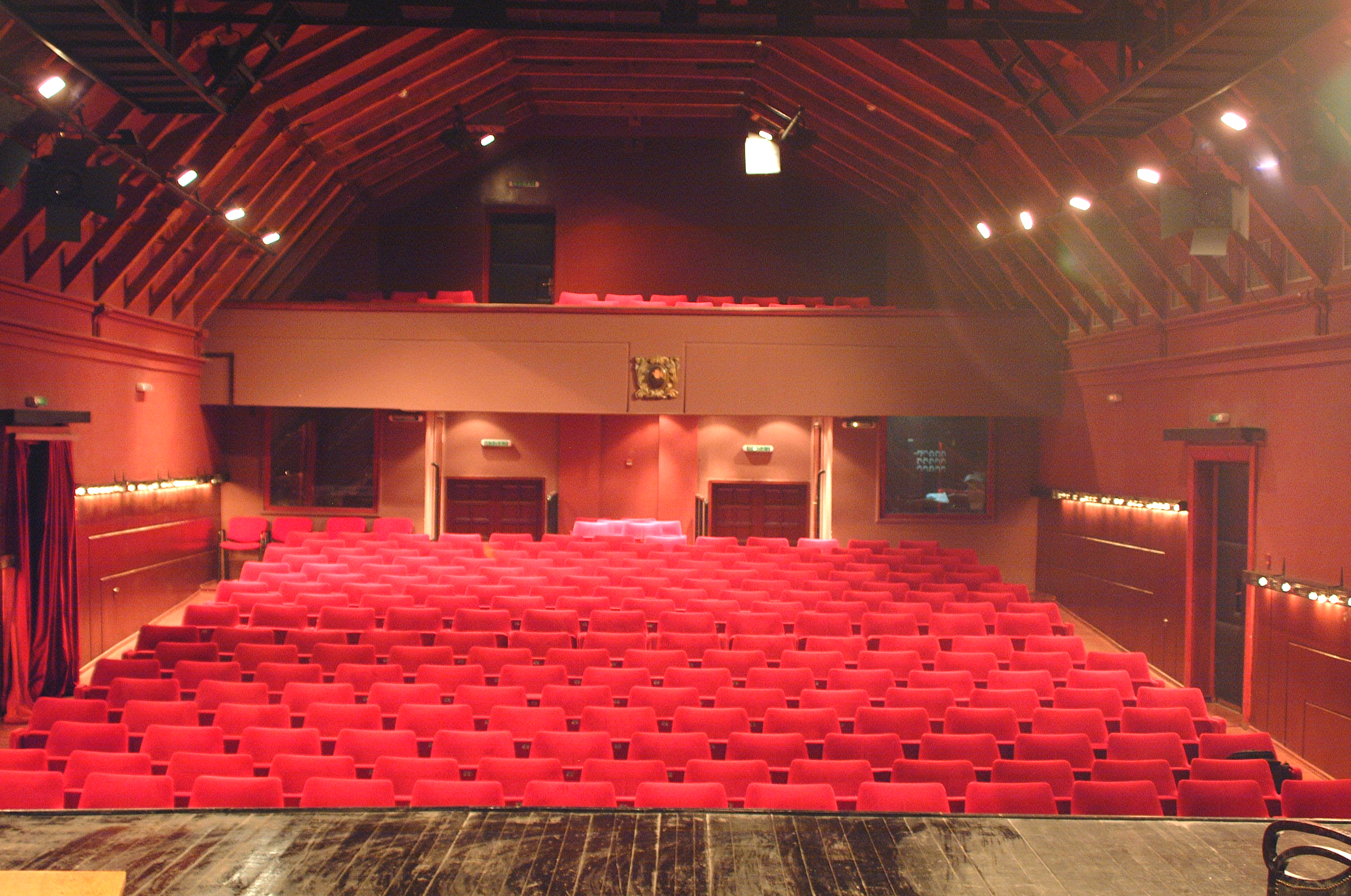
Stage Joakim Vujić

Joakim Vujić (1772–1847), writer, translator, foreign languages teacher, theater producer, Director of Knjaževsko Srbski Teatar, the first Serbian Court Theater director in Kragujevac 1835/36.

Report on the performance of the first secular play Krestalica in the Theater Rondella in August 1813 in Budapest that translated and organized Joakim Vujić. This performance marked the beginning of the Serbian secular theater.

August von Kotzebue (1761–1819) one of the most fruitful German writers seemed to be Vujić favorite playwright for he translated seven Kotzebue's plays.

Renewed after World War II, the theater became an open cultural institution of the City spreading its influences. The stage of this theater gave rise to skilled artists who marked the history of theater in the country.

Theater in City of Kragujevac that bears the name of the father of first Serbian theater Joakim Vujić has developed its repertoire and staged performances and turned into modern contemporary theater.

First theater performances are staged in 1825 by the teacher Djordje Evgenijevic and his pupils. During his second visit to Kragujevac Joakim Vujić worked together with them.

In the autumn of 1834 at the invitation of Grand Duke Miloš, Joakim Vujić, best known and highly esteemed person for his theater work, came to Kragujevac with large experience and repertoire. He was very soon appointed Director of the Theater with the task to organize theater work.

Knjazesko Srbski Teatar – First Serbian Court Theater was placed within the adapted premises of typography and it was a building with the stage, boxes and ground floor. The repertoire of the theater consisted mainly of his plays while the theater ensemble beside Vujić as a leading actor and director consisted of secondary school pupils and adult amateurs.

First performances were staged in the period of February 2–4, 1935 when the so-called Sretenje (the Visitation of the Virgin) Assembly sessions were held. These were mostly Vujić's plays performed for the Grand Duke and his family and the representatives of the people i.e. members of Assembly; the music was composed by Jozef Slezinger.

== Repertoire ==
Season 2009/2010 – the selection: Story about the late emperor daughter by Nikolai Koljada and directed by Boško Dimitrijević, Pinocchio by Carlo Collodi, director and scene designer Dušan Bajin, The liar and the archiliar by Jovan Sterija Popović, director and scene designer Dragan Jakovljević, Le ultime lune by Furio Bordon and directed by Massimo Luconi, Maids by Jean Genet and directed by Ivona Šijaković, The diary of a madman by Nikolai Gogol and played by Ivan Vidosavljević, D ale carnevalului by Ion Luca Caragiale and directed by Matei Varodi, Migrations by Miloš Crnjanski and directed by Pierre Walter Politz, Pirates by Miloš Janoušek and directed by Jan Čani, Thesis by Gerry Dukes, Paul Meade, David Parnell and directed by Dan Tudor, Cabinet Minister's wife by Branislav Nušić and directed by Jovan Grujić, Pioneers in Ingolstadt by Marieluise Flaisser and directed by Ivana Vujić, Club new world order by Harold Pinter, Hainer Muller, Plato, directed by Aleksandar Dunđerović, The devil and the little lady by Đorđe Milosavljević and directed by Žanko Tomić, Night in the pub Titanik by Nebojša Bradić and directed by Nebojša Bradić, The Beauty Queen of Leenane by Martin McDonagh and directed by Milić Jovanović, One man two guvnors by Richard Bean, directed by Nebojša Bradić, Twelve Angry Men by Reginald Rose and directed by Neil Fleckman.

== Ansamble ==
- Ivan Vidosavljević
- Nenad Vulević
- Jasmina Dimitrijević
- Katarina Janković
- Mladen Knežević
- Miloš Krstović
- Saša Pilipović
- Sanja Matejić
- Čedomir Štajn
- Avram Cvetković
- Aleksandar Milojević
- Bogdan Milojević
- Isidora Rajković
- Marija Rakočević
- Nikola Milojević
- Marina Stojanović
- Miodrag Pejković
- Dragan Stokić
- Dušan Stanikić
- Ana Kolanđeli
- Nadežda Jakovljević
- Milica Majstorović

== Publishing ==
=== Descendants of Joakim – Monograph ===
- Branka Petrić - Anchor and Sand, editor Tatjana Nježić, (2025) ISBN 978-86-920641-6-6
- Andras Urban - On the Paths of Freedom, author and editor Ana Tasić, (2025) ISBN 978-86-920641-5-9
- Renata Ulmanski - Njegovo veličanstvo: Slučaj, author Marko Misirača (2023) ISBN 978-86-920641-3-5
- Boro Drašković, Dictionary of the profession (2011) ISBN 978-86-909821-7-2
- Miodrag Tabački, Automonograph (2010) ISBN 978-86-909821-6-5
- Mirko Babić, always and everywhere, author Dragana Bošković (2009) ISBN 978-86-909821-4-1
- Biljana Srbljanović family and other tales, author Slobodan Savić (2008) ISBN 978-86-909821-1-0
- Vojislav Voki Kostić, author Miodrag Stojilović (2007) ISBN 978-86-909821-0-3
- Descendants of Joakim, author Feliks Pašić (2006) OCLC 500353113 ASIN B009ASMS1W

=== Premiere ===
- Night in the pub Titanik by Nebojša Bradić and directed by Nebojša Bradić (2011)
- The devil and the little lady by Đorđe Milosavljević and directed by Žanko Tomić (2011)
- Club new world order by Harold Pinter, Hainer Muller, Plato, directed by Aleksandar Dunđerović (2009) ISBN 978-86-909821-3-4
- Pioniere in Ingolstadt by Marieluise Flaisser and directed by Ivana Vujić (2009) ISBN 978-86-909821-2-7

== Theatre Day ==
On February 15, the Theatre day, the oldest Serbian theatre, delivers to the most eminent Serbian theatre writers, actors, directors, scenographers, composers, The Statuette of Joakim Vujić, The Ring with figure of Joakim Vujić and the Annual award of the Knjazevsko-srpski teatar.

=== Statuette of Joakim Vujić ===
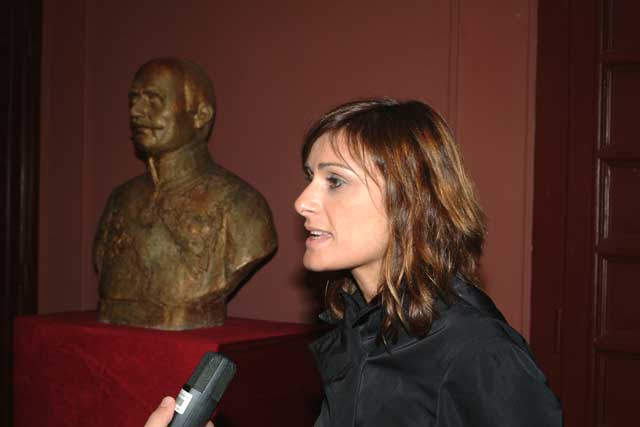
Biljana Srbljanović

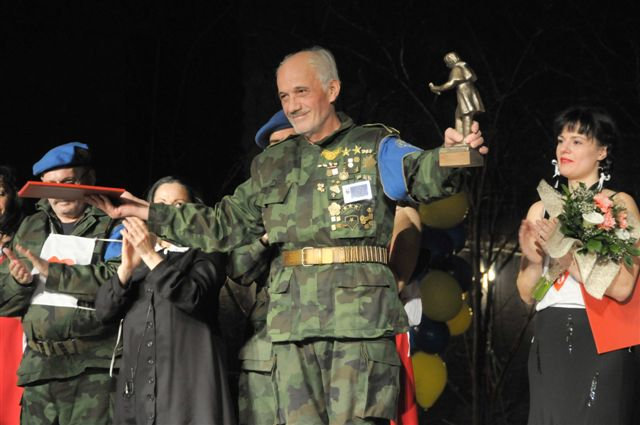
Mirko Babić, 2009

Creator of the Statuette of Joakim Vujić is Nikola Koka Janković (was born in Kragujevac in 1926), sculptor and a regular member of the Serbian Academy of Sciences and Arts.

Winners of The Statuette of Joakim Vujić
- 1985 – National Theatre in Belgrade, Ljuba Tadić, Mija Aleksić, Mira Stupica and Bora Glišić
- 1986 – Mira Banjac and Miroslav Belović
- 1987 – Dusan Kovačević and Miloš Žutić
- 1988 – Mira Trailović and Ljubomir Kovačević
- 1989 – Ljiljana Krstić and Dejan Mijač
- 1990 – Danilo Stojković and Jovan Ćirilov
- 1991 – Aleksandar Popović and Ljubomir Ubavkić Pendula
- 1992 – Branko Pleša and Branislav Ciga Jerinić
- 1993 – Not awarded
- 1994 – Stevo Žigon and Petar Kralj
- 1995 – Sava Barackov, Museum of Theatrical Arts of Serbia, Serbian National Theatre, Svetlana Bojković and Dejan Penčić Poljanski
- 1996 – Lazar Ristovski and Miloslav Buca Mirković
- 1997 – Bora Todorović and Festival – Days of Comedy in Jagodina
- 1998 – Stevan Šalajić
- 1999 – Ružica Sokić
- 2000 – Olivera Marković and Ljubomir Simović
- 2001 – Vida Ognjenović
- 2002 – Mileva Žikić
- 2003 – Belgrade Drama Theatre
- 2004 – Predrag Ejdus
- 2005 – Rade Marković and Egon Savin
- 2006 – Voki Kostić
- 2007 – Biljana Srbljanović
- 2008 – National Theatre in Niš
- 2009 – Mirko Babić
- 2010 – Miodrag Tabački
- 2011 – Boro Drašković
- 2012 – Vlastimir Đuza Stojiljković
- 2013 – Milena Dravić
- 2014 – Andraš Urban
- 2015 – Dara Džokić and Faculty of Dramatic arts
- 2016 – Nada Jurišić
- 2017 – Renata Ulmanski
- 2018 - Mihailo Janketić
- 2019 - Geroslav Zarić
- 2020 – Milanka Berberović
- 2021. - Svetozar Rapajić
- 2022. - Branka Petrić
- 2023. - Radomir Putnik
- 2024. - Vojislav Brajović
- 2025 - Gorica Popović and BITEF
- 2026 - Department of Dramatic Arts, Academy of Arts, Novi Sad

=== Ring with Figure of Joakim Vujić ===
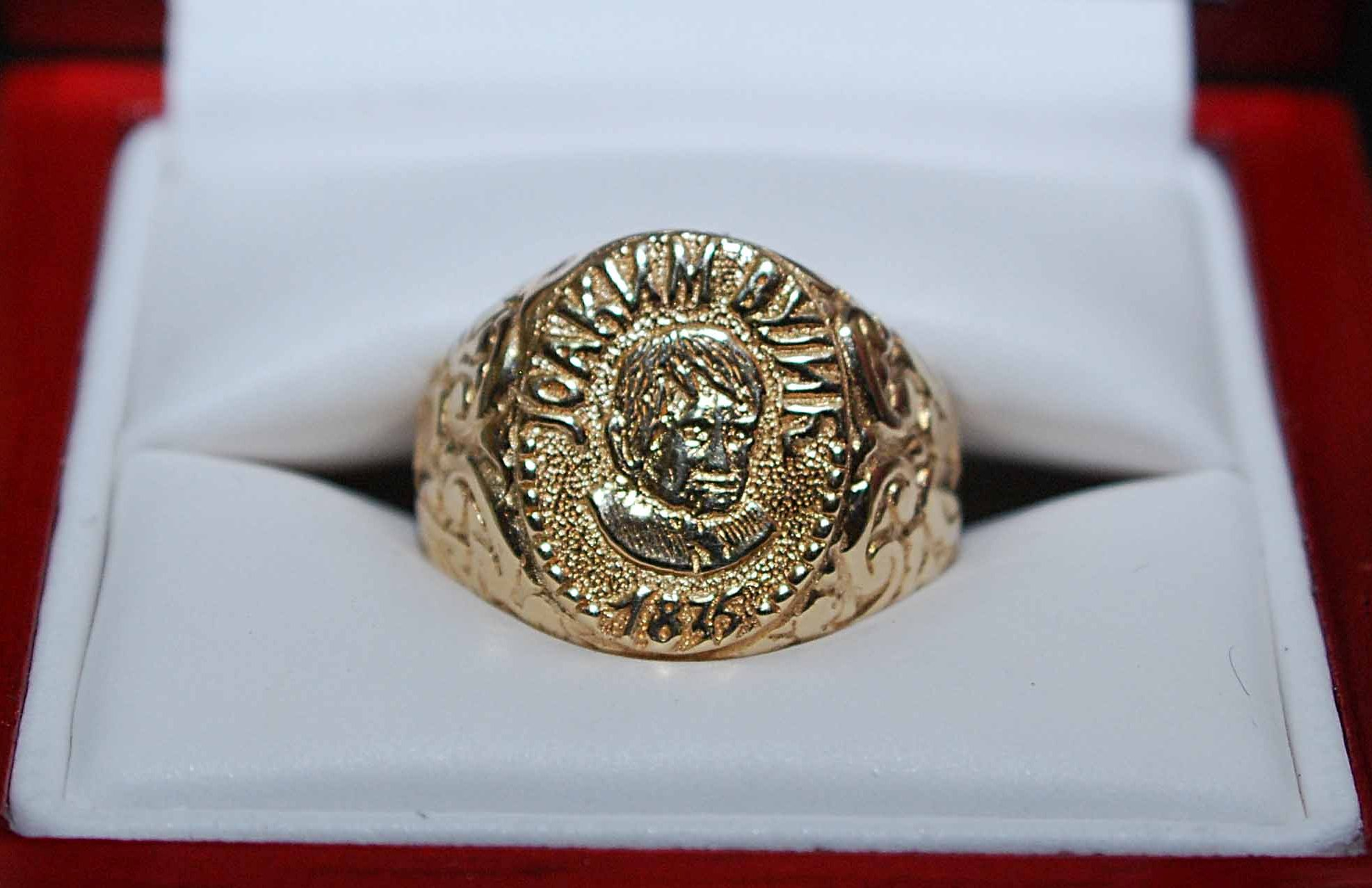
The Ring with figure of Joakim Vujić

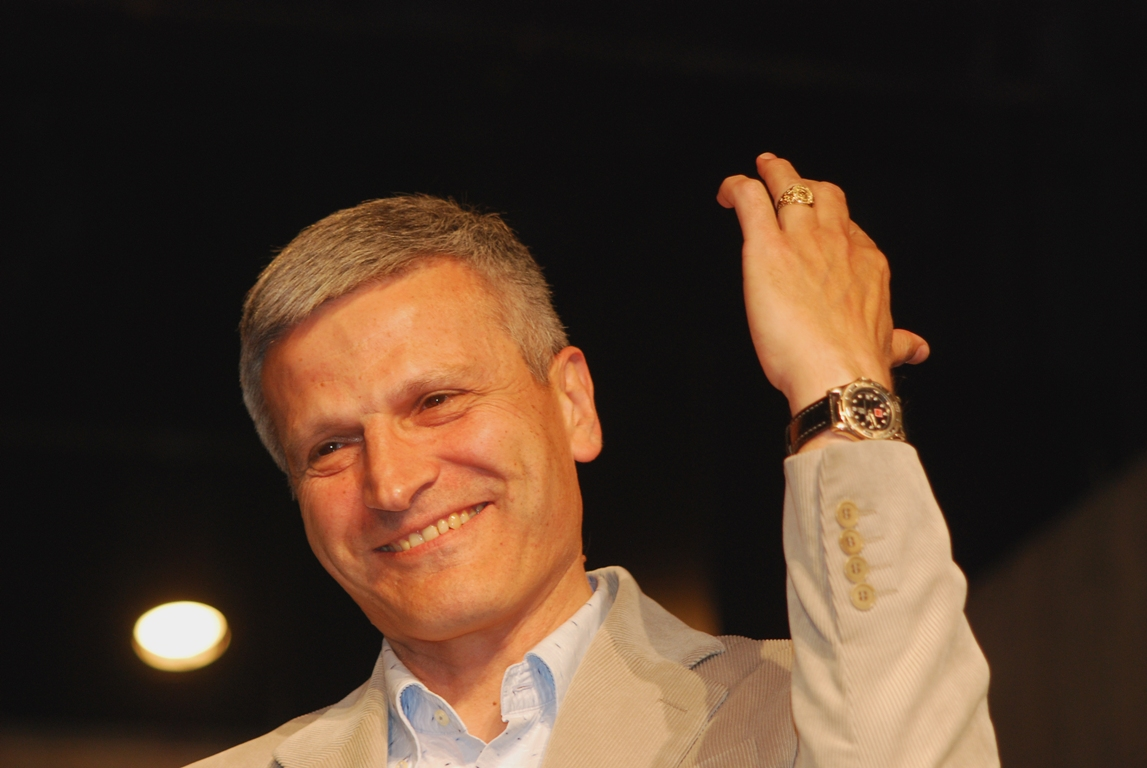
Nebojša Bradić, 2008 winner

Winners of The Ring with figure of Joakim Vujić
2002 – Ljubomir Ubavkić Pendula; 2003 – Marko Nikolić and Miodrag Marić; 2004 – Mirko Babić and Jug Radivojević; 2005 – Pierre Walter Politz; 2006 – Miloš Krstović; 2007 – Vladan Živković; 2008 – Nebojša Bradić; 2009 – Sebastian Tudor; 2010 – Dragana Bošković; 2011 – Dragan Jakovljević; 2012 – Gorica Popović; 2013 – Nada Jurišić; 2014 - Milan Rus; 2015 - Snežana Kovačević; 2016 - Ivana Vujić; 2017 - Marina Stojanović; 2018 - Bratislav Slavković; 2019 - Miodrag Pejković; 2020 - Jelena Janjatović; 2021 - Anđelka Nikolić; 2022 - Vladanka Pavlović; 2023 - Milić Jovanović; 2024 - Ivan Vidosavljević; 2025 - Aleksandar Milosavljević; 2026 - Aleksandar Lukač

== Theatre Today ==
In 1965 this theatre also initiated Meetings of professional Theatres Joakim Vujic of Serbia (in central Serbia) and they were held every year in May in one of ten different towns.

Since 2006, the Theatre became the regular host of Joakimfest, International Theatre Festival.

Being the institution of special significance to Serbian culture and art, the Theatre endeavours to develop other activities besides showing plays. Since 2005 the Theatre started grandiose publishing business with the Journal Joakim), founded the Gallery Joakim, ordered monographies of all the winners of the Statuette of Joakim Vujic, 2009 published the first edition book Premiere, started to research and publish drama heritage of Kragujevac. Plays are shown on Stage Joakim Vujic and Stage Ljuba Tadic, Teatroteka is also active, and from February 2007, will start to work the Stage Mija Aleksic. That is the reason why City of Kragujevac should bear the name of Teatropolis, which was proclaimed in 2005, on the 170th anniversary of foundation of the oldest theatre in renewed Serbia. Since 2010 Knjazevsko-srpski teatar is a member of the World Theater Network Interact.

On February the 14th 2007, at the proposal of the Managing Board of the Theatre Joakim Vujic, Kragujevac City Assembly brought the decision by which the oldest Serbian theatre is being given back its original name, Knjaževsko-srpski teatar.

== Gallery ==
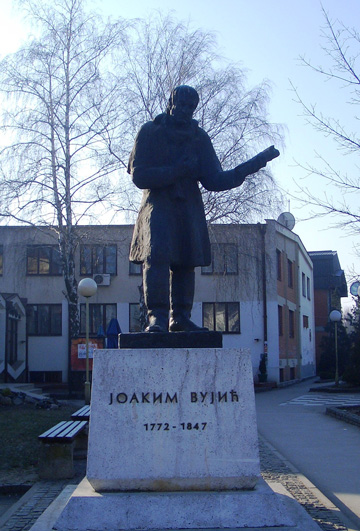
Joakim Vujić

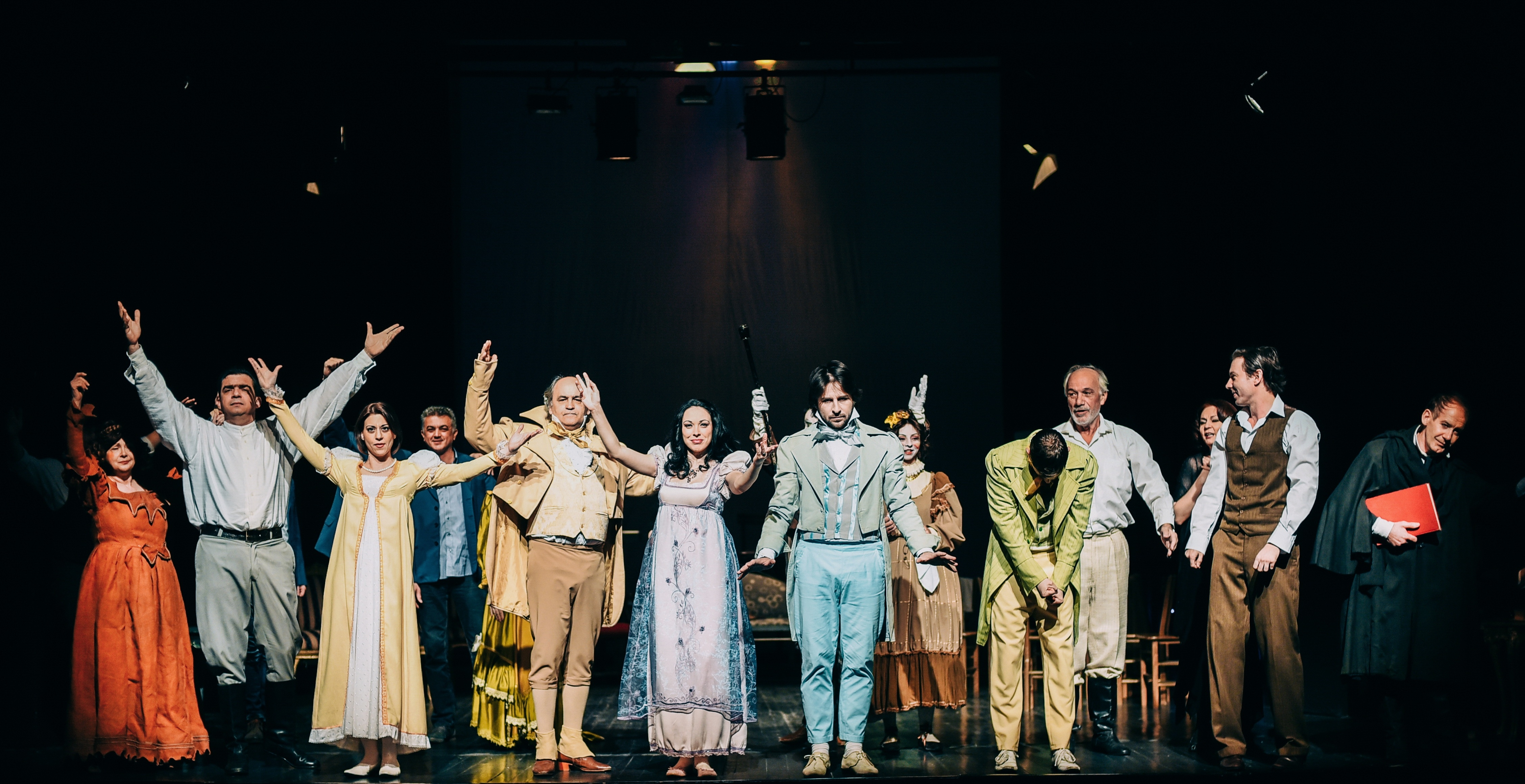
Ansamble

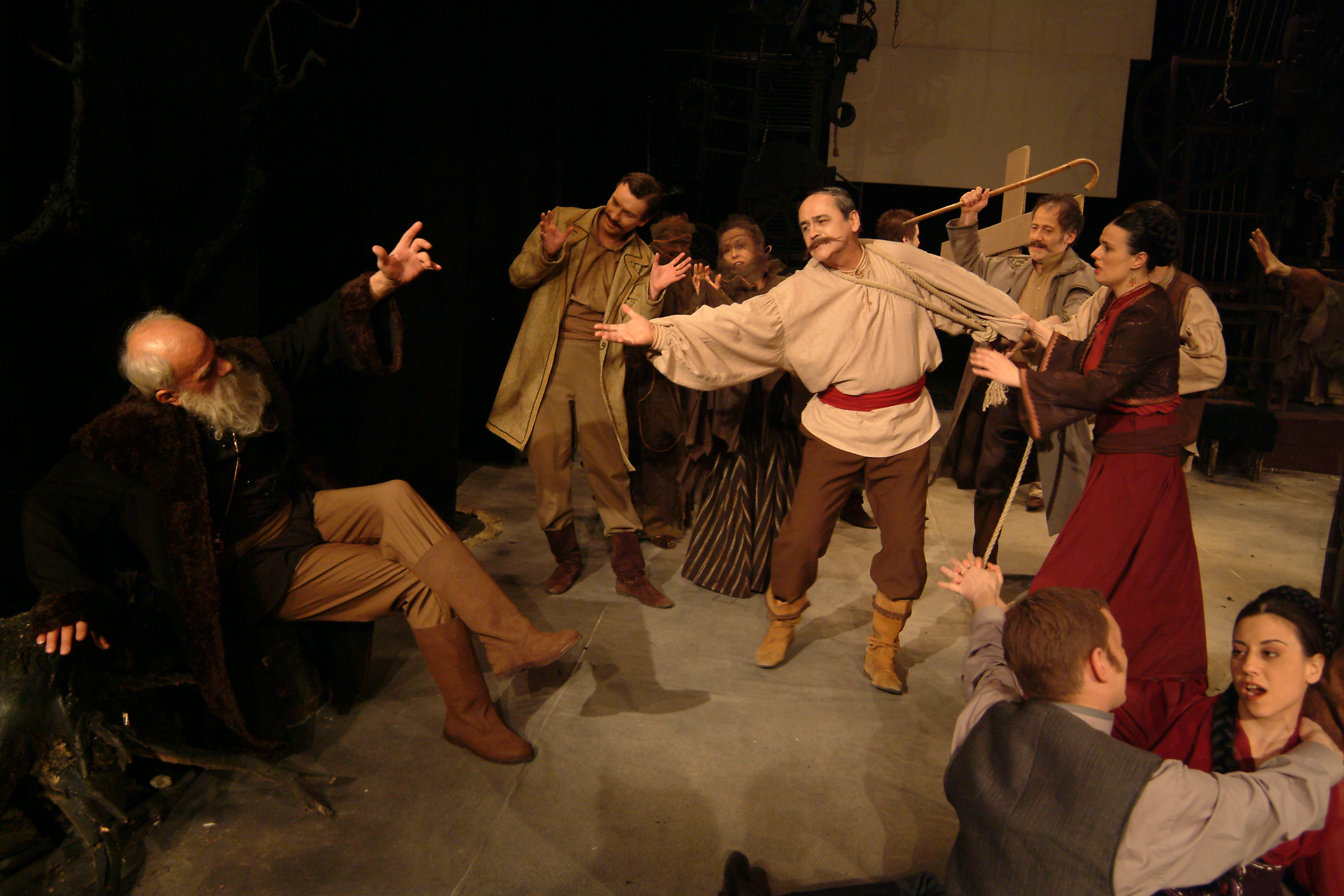
Konak u Kragujevcu

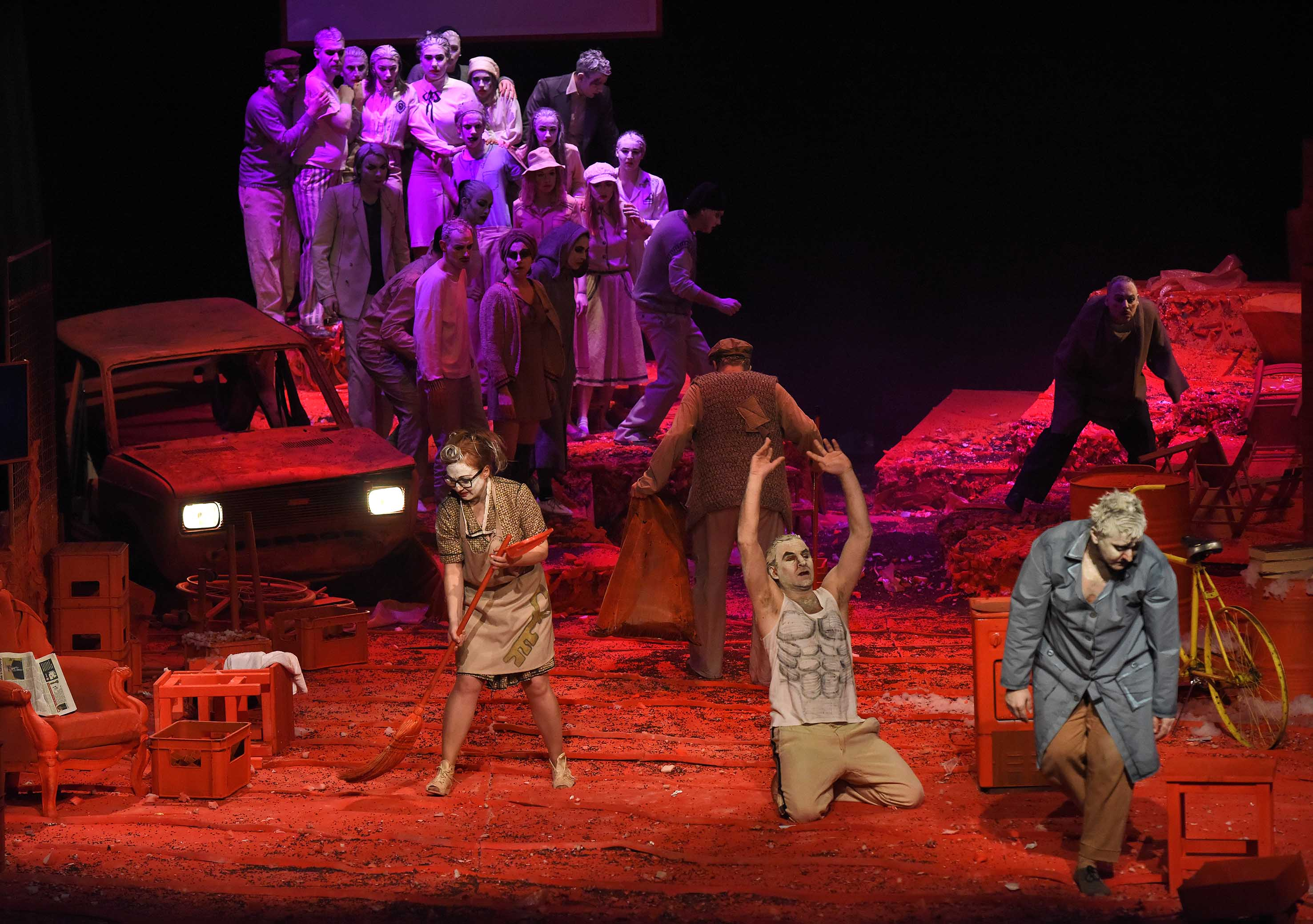
200

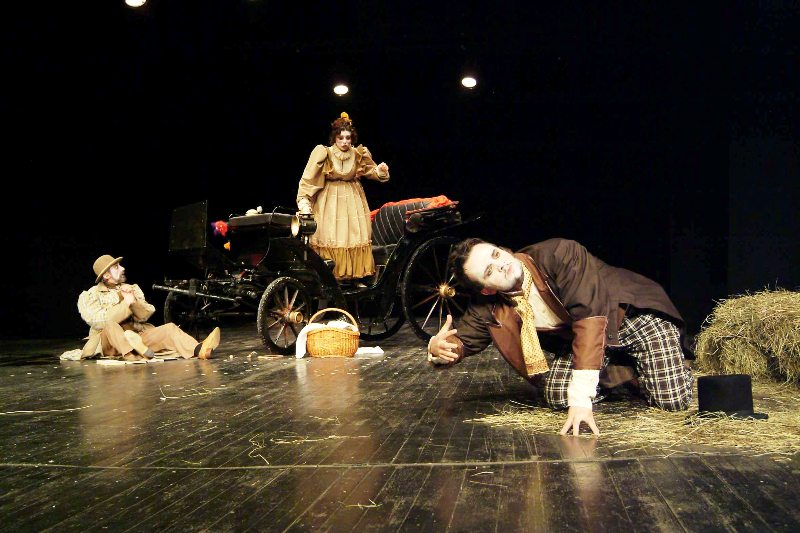
Laza i Paralaza

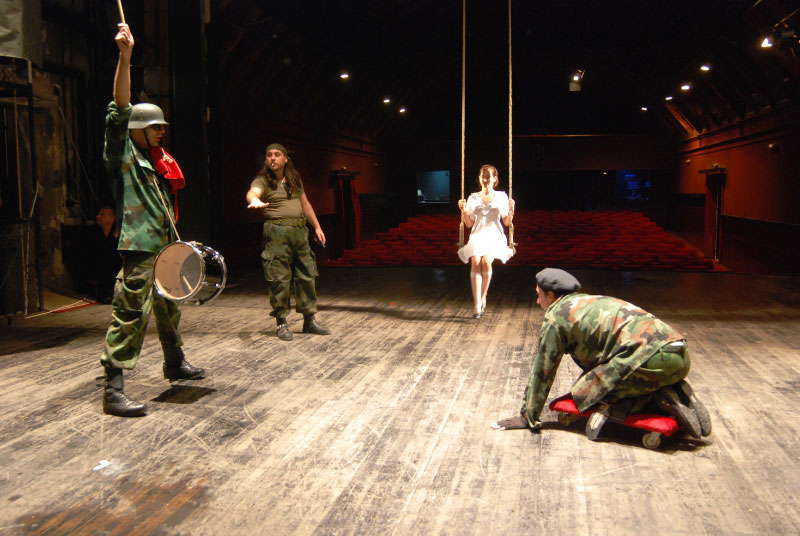
Club New World Order

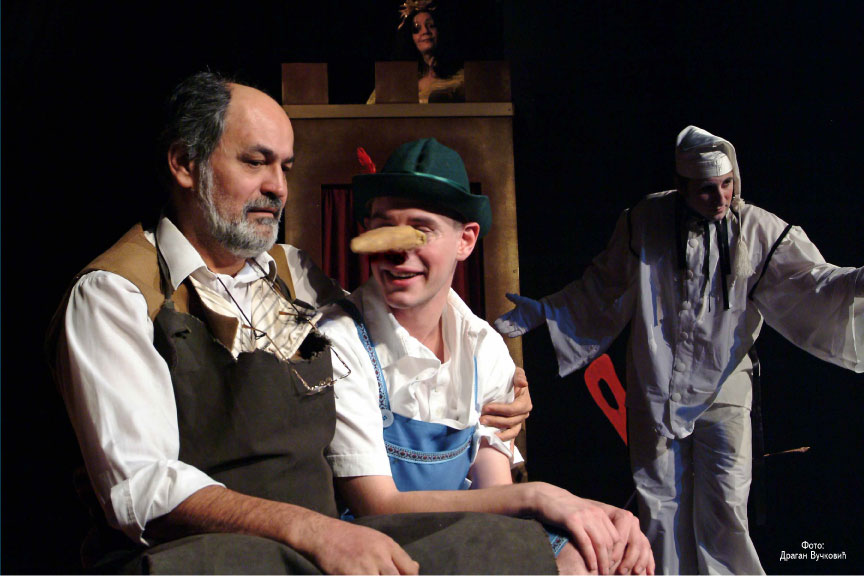
Pinocchio

== See also ==
- List of theatres in Serbia

== Sources ==
- Kragujevačko pozorište 1835–1951 Author: Rajko Stojadinović 1975
- Kragujevačko pozorište 1951–1984 Author: Rajko Stojadinović 2005, ISBN 86-82911-02-7
