= Mira Trailović =

Serbian theatre director (1924–1989)

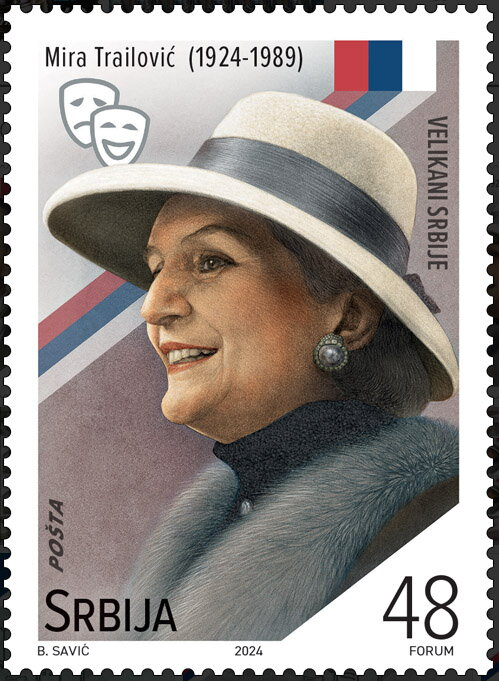
- Trailović on a 2024 Serbian postage stamp
- Born: Mira Milićević; 22 January 1924; Kraljevo, Kingdom of Serbs, Croats and Slovenes
- Died: 7 August 1989 (aged 65); Belgrade, SR Serbia, SFR Yugoslavia
- Occupations: dramaturg, theatre director
- Years active: 1944–1989
- Spouse: Dragoljub Trailović

Mira Trailović (Serbian Cyrillic: Мира Траиловић; née Milićević; 22 January 1924 – 7 August 1989) was a Serbian dramaturg and one of the most distinguished theatre directors in the history of Serbian and Yugoslav theatre. A pioneer of the avant-garde theatre in Eastern Europe, she was one of the founders and a driving force behind the Atelje 212 theater and BITEF, one of the most important European theatre festivals

== Early life and education ==
Born Mira Milićević on 22 January 1924 in Kraljevo, in central Serbia, she was raised by intellectual parents both of whom were professionally involved with French language. Her mother Radmila Simić (1894–1973) taught French while her father Andrej Milićević (1893–1973) worked as translator, involved with translating 36 works of French classical literature into Serbian. The couple had one more child, a daughter Olga (born 6 June 1931, in Belgrade).

On her mother's side, Milićević descended from the cadet branch of the Simić family, notable in the 19th century Serbia, both in politics and culture. The branch's progenitor, Aleksa Simić (1800–1872), held the Prime Minister of Serbia post in three terms (1843–1844, 1853–1855, 1856–1857), while her great grandfather, Milan Simić (1827–80), was manager of the National Theatre in Belgrade (1871–1875, 1877–1880).

Milićević was a student at the Second girls’ high school in Belgrade as well as the Higher Music school's drama section. She then enrolled in several studies, which she never finished: technology, architecture (her father's wish) and art history (even though she was only one exam away from graduating). She finished the Higher Film school and finally graduated as a theatre director at the Belgrade's Faculty of Drama Arts. In 1967 she would become a professor of the radio direction at her alma mater.

== Career ==
=== Radio Belgrade ===
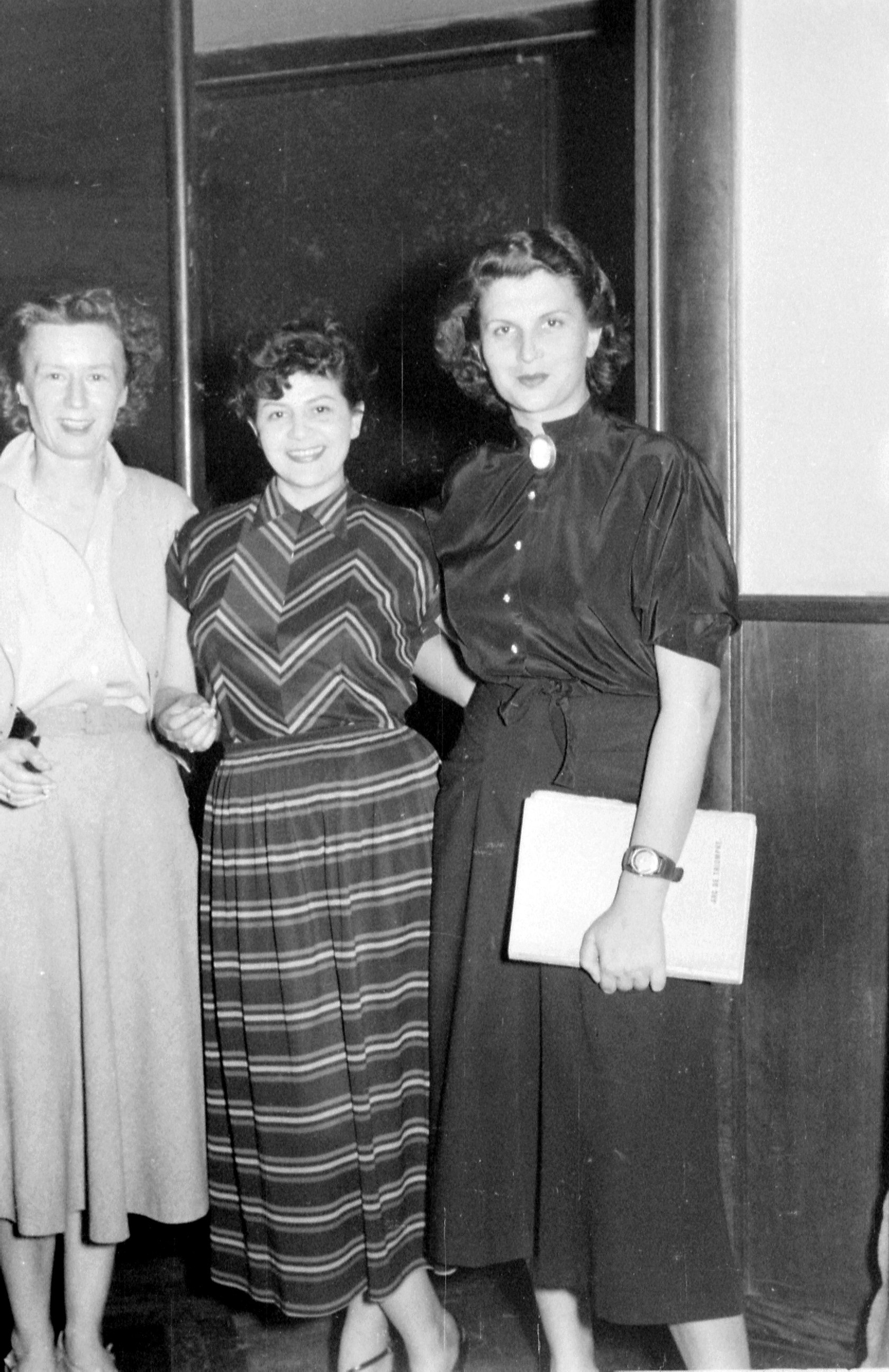
Trailović, right, with Vera Šegan and Mira Stupica during a radio drama taping at Radio Belgrade in the 1950s.

After Belgrade was freed from German occupation on 20 October 1944, Milićević, almost by chance, became the very first announcer on Radio Belgrade in the liberated city. Soon, she switched to direction, advancing to the post of program editor at the radio's drama section. She directed over 70 radio dramas, mostly by foreign authors.

=== Atelje 212 ===
She entered the world of theater as an assistant director at the Yugoslav Drama Theatre. She was a co-founder of the new theatre, Atelje 212 in 1956, with Radoš Novaković (serving as manager 1956–1958) and Bojan Stupica (manager 1958–1961). Atelje 212 opened with her direction of Goethe's Faust on 12 November 1956, with Trailović initially being an assistant manager (shortly acting in 1958) and in 1961 she became Atelje's manager, shifting its focus to the avant-garde plays.

Trailović herself directed over 20 plays, including some authors whose works were never before played in Serbia and Yugoslavia, like Jean-Paul Sartre (No Exit) in 1957, Eugène Ionesco (The Chairs) in 1957, Albert Camus (The Misunderstanding) in 1960 and Edward Albee (Who's Afraid of Virginia Woolf?) in 1964. Other plays include Don Juan in Hell (by George Bernard Shaw; 1956), Medal (adapted folk tales; 1957), L'Histoire du soldat (Charles-Ferdinand Ramuz; 1959), Tchin-Tchin (François Billetdoux; 1960), The Fantasticks (Tom Jones; 1962), The Cocktail Party (T. S. Eliot); 1965), Marat/Sade (Peter Weiss); 1966), Next time I'll sing to you (James Saunders; 1968), Jumpers (Tom Stoppard; 1974), The miracle in Šargan (Ljubomir Simović; 1975), The Mother (Stanisław Ignacy Witkiewicz; 1982), Big and Little (Botho Strauß; 1985), and Demons (Lars Norén; 1987).

Major controversy, however, was caused by her staging of the Hair, which was prepared in 1968 and premiered in 1969. A rock-musical, composed by Galt MacDermot, with lyrics by Gerome Ragni and James Rado, stirred not just the highest political and artistic circles, but also the common people. Heavily shook and agitated by the student protests of 1968, the Communist governing class and its diehards attacked the musical as subversive, due to its hippie and anti-establishment attitude. It had such an impact, that it is still debated.

Under her artistic and managerial guidance, though not a directorial one, Atelje 212 also presented for the first time in Serbia works of Samuel Beckett (Waiting for Godot) in 1956 (first staging in Eastern Europe), William Faulkner (Requiem for a Nun) in 1958, Sławomir Mrożek (The Police) in 1960, James Joyce (Exiles) and Tadeusz Różewicz (The Card Index), both in 1962. Also, she oversaw staging of contemporary Serbian authors’ works, like those of Aleksandar Popović, starting with Ljubinko and Desanka in 1964, and Dušan Kovačević, with The Marathon Family and, especially, Radovan III, both in 1973, which is with Atelje's "Ubu Roi" by Alfred Jarry (1964; both starring Zoran Radmilović), considered anthological in the history of Serbian theatre.

Atelje 212 gained international reputation. It was the first theatre from Yugoslavia that was invited to the United States after World War II, and toured the world (Paris, New York, Moscow, Caracas, Mexico).

Trailović retired in 1983 as a manager, as she was required to do so by the law, but she continued to direct. She also directed Maria by Isaac Babel in the Schiller Theater in Berlin, with German cast and Konak by Miloš Crnjanski in the National Theatre in Belgrade in 1986. Her last, unfinished project was Alban Berg's opera Lulu, which she wanted to adapt for the Belgrade Opera.

=== BITEF ===
In 1967, together with Jovan Ćirilov, she founded BITEF – Belgrade International Theatre Festival, and was its artistic co-director until she died. The festival, subtitled New theatre tendencies, was an effort to bring the latest movements within the avant-garde theatre to Belgrade. Trailović tenaciously travelled around the world bringing to BITEF the greatest names of the 20th century theatre, their companies and plays, so the festival gradually evolved into one of the major theatrical festivals in Europe.

BITEF was especially successful as it was arguably the only place where artists from both sides of the Iron Curtain could meet. Over the decades, programs encompassed various directions. On one side, the extreme experimental tendencies, like Judith Malina and The Living Theatre, Jerzy Grotowski, Richard Schechner, Tadeusz Kantor, Peter Schumann and the Bread and Puppet Theater. On the other, new directorial interpretations of classical works (Peter Brook, Peter Stein, Ingmar Bergman, Otomar Krejča, Peter Zadek, Patrice Chéreau, Claus Peymann, Roger Planchon, Yuri Lyubimov). Also, performances of the contemporary dance were regular, choreographed by Alwin Nikolais, Merce Cunningham, Pina Bausch or Birgit Cullberg.

BITEF also showed performances of the traditional, folk theatres, like Chinese Peking opera, Japanese Noh theatre, Ugandan traditional theatre or the Opera dei pupi (Sicilian marionettes theatre), but also followed the theatre's coming out of the box, that is, having performances outside of the theatre buildings, giving shows on stadiums, in semi-collapsed industrial zones and peers, or simply out in the open.

Lyubimov's Taganka Theatre was allowed by the Soviet authorities to visit BITEF which was the first time at all they were allowed to leave the USSR, as, until that point, Lyubimov was deemed a dissident by the Soviet government. From the late 1970s, Trailović was right on time with postmodern aesthetics in scenic arts, bringing to Belgrade Robert Wilson (Einstein on the Beach), Johann Kresnik, Tomaž Pandur.

Some artists gained international recognition after being summoned by Trailović to the festival: Luca Ronconi (with his famous Orlando furioso), Victor Garcia, Roberto Ciulli and his Theater an der Ruhr. Other directors and companies which performed on BITEF include Eugenio Barba, Steven Berkoff, Dejan Mijač, Pyotr Fomenko, Teatro Núria Espert, Pip Simmons Theatre Group, Ellen Stewart and La MaMa while authors Samuel Beckett, Jean Paul Sartre and Eugène Ionesco attended performances of their plays.

=== France ===
In the first half of the 1980s, Trailović lived in France for several years. In 1983–84 she worked in Theatre of Nations in Paris and was an artistic director of the International theatre festival in Nancy.

=== BITEF Teatar ===
In 1989 she founded a new theatre, "BITEF Teatar", and became its manager. Theatre is seated in the never fully finished nor consecrated German Evangelical church in Belgrade's neighborhood of Dorćol. Construction began in 1940. It was projected by Otto Bartning and developed and supervised by Đorđe Staševski, who partially changed the interiors in 1943 in the projected residential section of the church, facing the Drinčićeva street. The works stopped in 1951. The building was renovated to accommodate the new theatre in 1988–89. It is considered to be the unique case that, instead of a theatre founding the festival (like Atelje 212 did with BITEF), in this case, the festival founded a theatre. The theatre was opened on 3 March 1989. It was envisioned without having a permanent staff. The idea behind the creation of BITEF teatar was to organize the BITEF festival and to expand the effects of the festival throughout the year, and not only in the period when BITEF was held, but Trailović died later that same year.

Among the managers who inherited her at the helm of the theatre were playwright Nenad Prokić (1997–2005) and theatrical director Nikita Milivojević (2005–09).

The building of the "BITEF teatar" was declared a cultural monument by the Serbian government in April 2013.

=== Television ===
She also adapted and directed over 15 TV dramas, including The Browning version by Terence Rattigan (1973), Exiles by James Joyce (1973), Nora by Henrik Ibsen (1975) and A Novel about London by Miloš Crnjanski (1988). Aired on 19 January 1972, her adaptation of Albert Camus' The Misunderstanding was the first TV drama in Serbia recorded in TV studio, and the first one aired in color.

== Style and image ==
In her work, molded by her Balzacian talent, Trailović exhibited strong disposition towards the avant-garde repertoire, though she always rejected the term itself, asking "And what is avant-garde?". She constantly baffled and surprised, both the audience and the critics, with her ideas, innovations and seemingly inexhaustible energy and persistence. Because of the acuteness of hers, endless charm and talent for persuasion, she was nicknamed "bulldozer in a fur coat".

Her activities were always followed by controversial reactions and urban myths. Refreshing spirit of the avant-garde wasn't accepted well by the Communist authorities. Press was full of malicious comments and stories how young actors were terrified of her, labeling her "a woman with 24 smiles" while her outfits during public appearances were under scrutiny to the last detail. She herself said that "Yugoslav journalists trained her not to get accustomed to praises and compliments".

Her closest collaborator Ćirilov called her "the ruler of the arts", while Ionesco, when asked what he has seen in Belgrade when he visited in 1971, replied: "I saw Mira Trailović. Isn’t that enough?".

== Personal life ==
While working in Radio Belgrade, she met Dragoljub Trailović, a fellow radio announcer working at the station since 1947, and they got married. Born on 3 May 1925 in Prahovo, eastern Serbia, he left Radio Belgrade in 1955 when he became a commentator for the daily Borba until 1959 when he was appointed an editor-in-chief of Radio Television Belgrade until 1962. He later became a correspondent from Paris for the daily Politika and, as a respected journalist, was editor-in-chief of Politika Ekspres and Politika itself 1982–83. They remained married until Mira's death on 7 August 1989. Dragoljub died on 3 June 1993 in Belgrade. The couple had no children.

Her sister Olga Milićević Nikolić is a well-known architect, who reconstructed some of downtown Belgrade's landmarks like Andrićev Venac (1976), Republic Square (1980) or Nikola Pašić Square (1987), but also projected residential blocks 28, 45 and 70 in New Belgrade (1972), Lešće cemetery (1972) and the Stepin Lug wooden area (1972).

== Legacy ==
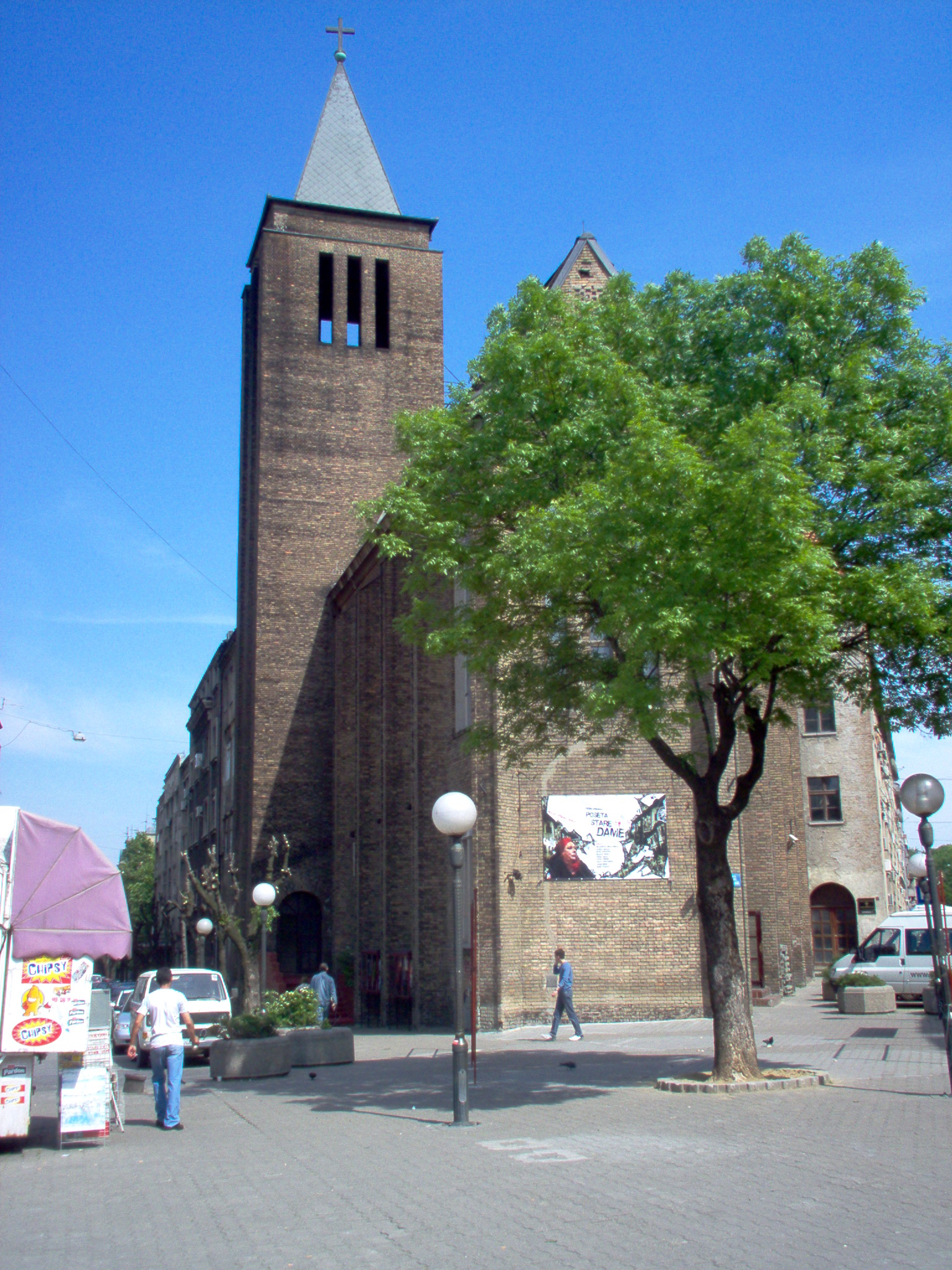
The Mira Trailović Square in Belgrade in front of the BITEF theater building.

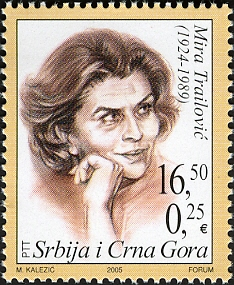
Trailović on a 2005 Serbian stamp

From modern perspective, it is hard to imagine how much of a courage and personal vision was needed at the time to modernize the theatre against the major opposition from the ideological, cultural and artistic establishments. As a director and manager, Trailović often appeared as a Don Quixote tilting at windmills, fighting against the "narrow minds", with the constant idea of "bringing the world to Belgrade and showing Belgrade to the world".

Through Atelje 212 and BITEF, she marked the beginning of a new era in Serbian theatre. On one side, she deprovincialized the theatrical scene in Belgrade and Serbia by allowing the audience inspection into the world theatre's current events. On the other, she toured the parts of the world where Serbian language was basically never heard before. What theatrologists found bewildering was that Trailović was seen as quite traditional and old fashioned, and yet she was an important figure in modernization of theatre – ranging from the theatre of the absurd and docudrama to rock opera and postmodernism – which they explained.

BITEF remains one of the major European festivals. Founded in the mid of the Cold War, it was a unique place where theatres from the West and East could meet. The great stage in modern Atelje 212 is named after her, the Mira Trailović stage, and BITEF's main award is named the Grand Prix "Mira Trailović".

She bequeathed her inheritance to the Museum of the theatrical art in Belgrade. With that data, but also with the interviews with many of her collaborators and his own interviews with her, theatrical and literary critic Feliks Pašić (1939–2010) published a book Gospođa iz velikog sveta – prilozi za biografiju Mire Trailović (A lady of the big world – contributions to the Mira Trailović's biography).

One day after her death, Danilo Kiš wrote her an epitaph, titled Upon hearing the news of death of Mrs. M.T.:

What a nicely done job, Death,
what a success,
to tear down a fortress like that!
To devour so much meat,
to crack so many bones
in such a short time.
To spend so much energy,
swiftly, as if you smoked a cigarette.
What a job that was, Death,
what a demonstration of power.
(As if we wouldn’t
trust your word on it.)

A square in front of the BITEF Theatre, below the bohemian quarter Skadarlija, and next to the Bajloni open green market, is named in her honor, the Square of Mira Trailović. The room for the artists above the main stage in the Bitef theatre is called "Mira's room" (Mirina soba).

In March 2019, director Andraš Urban staged a text, dramatized by Vedrana Božinović, dedicated to Mira Trailović. The play, titled "M.I.R.A.", was part of the 30th anniversary of the Bitef Theatre. Trailović was portrayed by the actress Mirjana Karanović.

== Filmography ==
=== TV dramas ===
Year	Original title	Title	Credited as		Author
Year	Original title	Title	Director	Adaptation	Author
1961	Siromašni Mali ljudi	Poor little people	Yes	No	Anton Chekhov
1962	Trojanskog rata neće biti	The Trojan War Will Not Take Place	Yes	No	Jean Giraudoux
1967	Koktel	The Cocktail Party	Yes	No	T. S. Eliot
1967	Arno i Jane	Drei Rosen aus Papier	Yes	No	Manfred Bieler
1972	Pesnikova pisma	The Aspern Papers	Yes	No	Henry James, Michael Redgrave
1972	Smeh sa scene: Atelje 212	Laughter from the stage: Atelje 212	Yes	Yes	documentary
1972	Nesporazum	The Misunderstanding	Yes	Yes	Albert Camus
1973	Brauningova verzija	The Browning Version	Yes	No	Terence Rattigan
1973	Izgnanici	Exiles	Yes	No	James Joyce
1974	Porodični orkestar	Personal orchestra	Yes	No	Aleksei Arbuzov
1975	Nora	A Doll's House	Yes	Yes	Henrik Ibsen
1976	Priča o vojniku	L'Histoire du soldat	Yes	No	Charles-Ferdinand Ramuz
1976	Poseta stare dame	The Visit of the Lady	Yes	No	Friedrich Dürrenmatt
1977	Marija Magdalena	Maria Magdalena	Yes	Yes	Friedrich Hebbel
1978	Maska	Masks	Yes	Yes	Miloš Crnjanski
1988	Roman o Londonu	A novel about London	Yes	Yes	Miloš Crnjanski
1989	Čudo u Šarganu	The miracle in Šargan	Yes	No	Ljubomir Simović

== Accolades ==
Regarding the awards, Trailović said that she doesn't care about them but that they do flatter her.

Yugoslav and Serbian awards include City of Belgrade's "Oktobarska nagrada" in 1976 (for The miracle in Šargan), "Sedmojulska nagrada" (at the time the highest government award in Serbia), Statuette of Joakim Vujić in 1988, Order of Merits for the People and "Popularity Oscar" for the most popular person in culture, which proved that her popularity exceeded the artistic and theatrical circles.

She received the most prominent French award Légion d'honneur in 1985, awarded to her by the French culture minister Jack Lang and was knighted by the Italian president Giuseppe Saragat. Other awards include the prizes of the Association of the American Theatre Artists, German embassy in Belgrade, Bulgarian and Czechoslovak theatrical societies, International Theatre Institute and the Polish Order of merit for culture.
