= Theatre studies =

Field of study

Theatre studies (sometimes referred to as theatrology or dramatics) is the study of theatrical performance in relation to its literary, physical, psychological, sociological, and historical contexts. It is an interdisciplinary field which also encompasses the study of theatrical aesthetics and semiotics. A late-20th-century development in the area has been the ethnographic theory of theatre.

== List of theatrologists ==
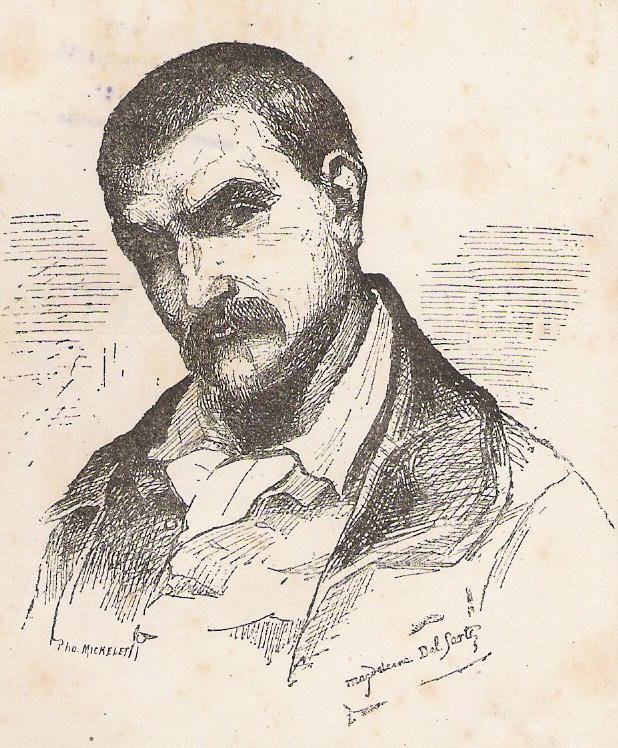
French theatrologist François Delsarte

Because of the interdisciplinary nature of the field, those who have been described as theatrologists can vary widely in terms of the primary focus of their activities.

- Emil František Burian – writer, singer, actor, musician, composer, playwright and director
- Jovan Ćirilov – philosopher, dramaturge, and writer
- François Delsarte – teacher of acting and singing
- Joseph Gregor – theatre historian and opera librettist
- John Heilpern – theatre critic and essayist
- Antoine Vitez – actor, director, and poet

== See also ==
- Dramatic theory
- Theatre criticism
- Theatre practitioner
- Theatre semiotics
- Film studies
- Television studies
