= Mladen Knežević =

Serbian actor

- Born: 6 January 1979 (age 47); Kragujevac, SFR Yugoslavia
- Occupation: Actor
- Years active: 2004–present

Mladen Knežević (Serbian Cyrillic: Младен Кнежевић; born 6 January 1979) is a Serbian theater, film and television actor.

On 26 March 2021 he was appointed the director of the Princely Serbian Theatre.
