= Aleksandar Dunđerović =

Serbian theatre director

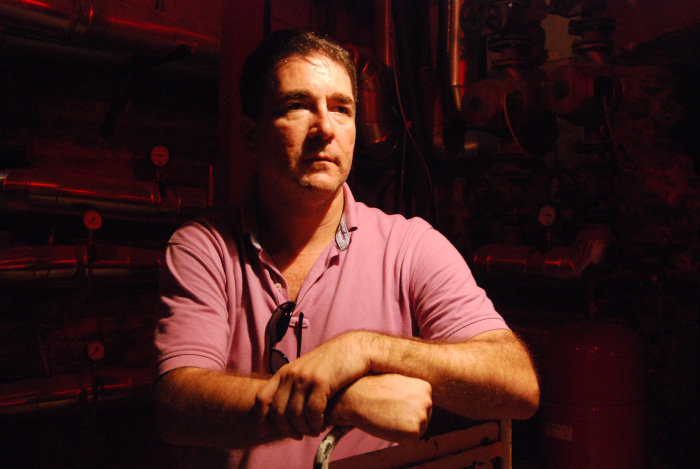
Aleksandar Dunđerović

Aleksandar Dunđerović (Serbian: Александар Дунђеровић) is a professor of performing arts, professional theatre director, published author, and establish leader in higher education. He is Director of Centre for Interdisciplinary Arts, associate director of research in performing arts at Royal Birmingham Conservatoire. He served as a head of department of Drama and Theatre Studies at The University College Cork, Ireland.

== Biography ==
Dr Aleksandar Dundjerović was born in Belgrade where he studied theatre directing at FDU, University of Arts and moved to Canada in early 90s. As a theatre director he worked in the past 20 years in ex Yugoslavia (Serbia), United States, Canada, United Kingdom, Colombia, Brazil and Iran.

From 1995 he moved to UK where he studied with Professor David Bradby and obtained PhD. in Theatre Studies from Royal Holloway, University of London. In 2000 he founded Theatre Kolectiv in England.

Before taking up a post of Head of Department in Drama and Theatre Studies in Cork in 2011 he was teaching at Royal Holloway College, Liverpool Hope University, Brunel University (London). In 2005 Dr Dundjerovic became a senior lecturer in theatre performance at The University of Manchester, UK where he was running theatre practice program. His research focuses on Contemporary Theatre Performance (interdisciplinary performance, directing and devising), political theatre, Latin American Theatre, and the cross-overs between film and theatre. He is an author of number of books and articles on theatre and film directing and producing.

He was visiting professor at Theatre Postgraduate Program at University of São Paulo in 2007. In 2008-9 he received prestigious Leverhulme Research Award to do a research on the Brazilian Contemporary Theatre. He is a contributor to 2010 The Routledge Drama Anthology and Sourcebook on Contemporary Performance.

He lives in Liverpool.

== Plays ==
- Desire Under the Elms (1992)
- Faust Montage (1993)
- Hamletmachine (1994)
- Christmas Carol re mix (1997)
- Cabaret Europe (2000, 2005)
- Ubu Reconstructed (2002)
- The Trial of Harold Pinter (2006)
- The Cherry Orchard (2008, 2009, 2010 and 2011)
- Club New World Order (2009)
- The Glass Menagerie (2011)
- Death of A Salesman (2013)

== Works ==
- Theatre Management (1993)
- The Cinema of Robert Lepage (Wallflower Press, 2003)
- The Theatricality of Robert Lepage (McGill-Queen University Press, 2007)
- Robert Lepage – Routledge Performance Practitioners (London/New York: Routledge, 2009)

== Gallery ==
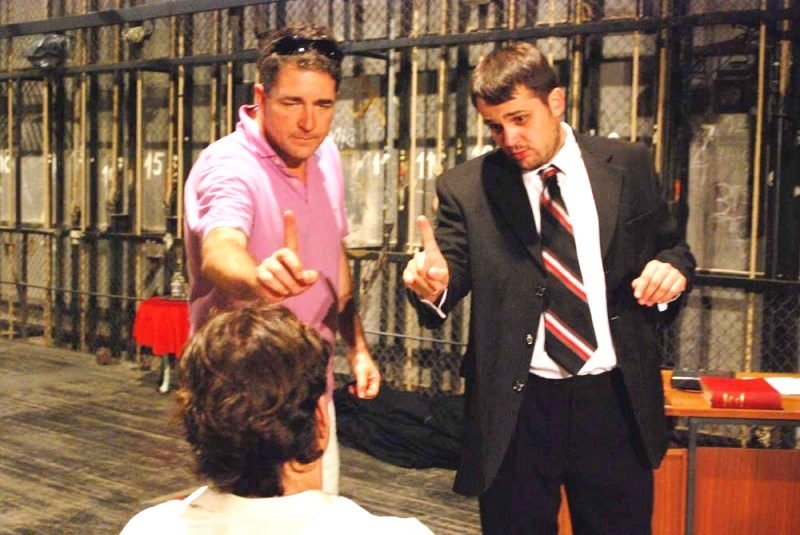
Aleksandar Dunđerović, Knjaževsko-srpski teatar, 2009

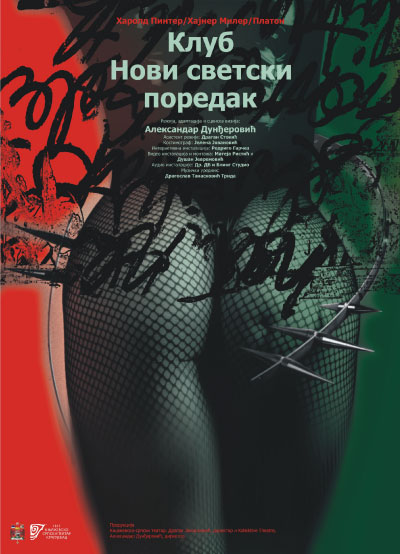
H. Pinter, H. Muller, Platon Club New World Order
