= Jovan Ćirilov =

Serbian writer and academic

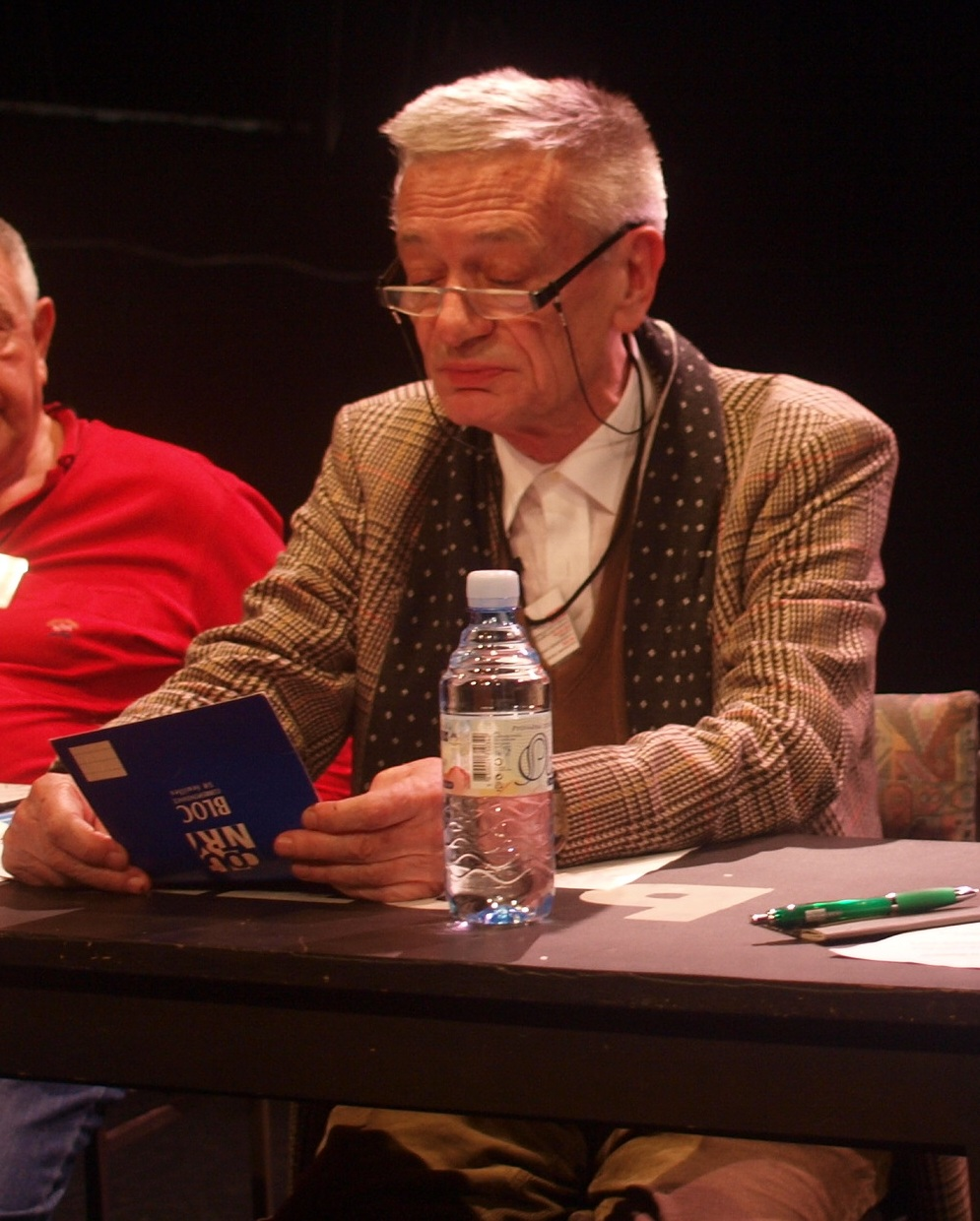
- Ćirilov at a conference in 2009
- Born: 30 August 1931; Kikinda, Kingdom of Yugoslavia
- Died: 16 November 2014 (aged 83); Belgrade, Serbia
- Occupations: Theatrologist, philosopher, writer, theatre selector, poet
- Years active: 1955–2014

Jovan Ćirilov (Serbian Cyrillic: Јован Ћирилов, pronounced [jǒvan tɕirǐlov]; 30 August 1931 – 16 November 2014) was a Serbian theatrologist, philosopher, writer, theatre selector, and poet.

== Biography ==
Ćirilov was born in Kikinda. the only son of Milivoj Ćirilov, a council clerk, and his wife, Jelica (née Ivačković). His parents later divorced. After finishing school in his home town, he enrolled and graduated philosophy at the University of Belgrade Faculty of Philosophy in 1955. He was at the head of the Yugoslav Drama Theatre from 1985–1999, and before that he had worked as a dramaturge since 1956, as well in Atelje 212 since 1967 to 1985. Since establishment in 1967 to 2014, Jovan was the artistic director and selector of BITEF festival, longest in the history of international theatre festivals.

In 2000, he received a Special Prize by the Jury of the Europe Theatre Prize, awarded to BITEF.

Since 2001 to 2007, he was the President of the National Commission of Yugoslavia, then Serbia, in UNESCO.

He wrote the plays Room for four and House of Silence (with Miroslav Belović), scripts for the Vladimir Slijepčević film Real state of situation, Ward, Where after the rain (shown in Venice, Moscow and Pula), radio plays Windy Roads (in German language, Radio Hamburg), Mechanical secretary and others. Adapted for the stage of The Damned Yard by Ivo Andrić, and together with Belović Discovery, by Dobrica Ćosić.

He was the author of novels, several collections of poems, theatrological essays, books of memories, an anthology of plays (Serbian contemporary drama in English, British and American contemporary drama, The shortest plays in the world, etc...) and vocabularies. He had translated plays by Christopher Fry, Bertolt Brecht, Jean Genet, Stoppard, Sam Shepard, David Mamet, Marber and the musical Hair.

Writer of columns in NIN magazine, (named "Word of the week", since 1986 to this day), two columns a week in the Blic newspaper, (named "Pozorištarije" and "With hands in pockets") and theater news in the Ludus theatre newspapers.

As a member of the League of Communists of Yugoslavia, he was the first person who publicly called for decriminalisation of male same-sex relations ("sodomy laws") in the 1980s.

He spoke German, English, French, Spanish, Italian, Serbian and studied Chinese.

== Death ==
He died in Belgrade after a short illness on 16 November 2014. He is interred in the Alley of Distinguished Citizens in the Belgrade New Cemetery.

== Works ==
=== Published books ===
- Путовање по граматици, The journey for grammar, poems, 1972.
- Неко време у Салцбургу, Some time in Salzburg, a novel, 1980.
- Узалудна путовања, песме, Trip in vain, songs, 1989.
- Реч недеље, Word of the Week, a collection of articles (columns), 1997. and 2006.
- Пре и после гнева, Before and after anger, зборник савремене британске драме, repertory of modern British drama, 2001.
- Пре и после Косе, Before and after Kosa, зборник савремене америчке драме, repertory of modern American drama, 2002.
- Сви моји савременици I-II, All of my contemporaries, collection of short biographies, 2010/11.
- Мајке познатих, Mothers of the famous, collection of short biographies, 2011.

=== Theatrical works ===
- Путовање по позоришту, Travels in Theatre, 1988.
- Драмски писци моји савременици, Dramatic writers my contemporaries, 1989.
- Позориштарије, Pozorištarije, 1998.
- Дневници, Diaries, 1999.

=== Dramas, plays and scripts ===
- Room for four, play (with Miroslav Belović)
- House of Silence, play (with Miroslav Belović)
- The Real State of Affairs, movie script for the Vladan Slijepčević film
- The Climber, movie script
- Where after the rain?, movie script (shown in Venice, Moscow and Pula)
- Windy Roads (in German language, Radio Hamburg), radio play
- Mechanical secretary, radio play
- The Damned Yard by Ivo Andrić, adapted for the stage
- Discovery, by Dobrica Ćosić, together with Belović, adapted for the stage

=== Dictionaries ===
- Речник нових речи, Dictionary of new words, 1982.
- Речник песничких слика, Dictionary of poetic images, 1985.
- Нови речник нових речи, New Dictionary of new words, 1991.
- Српско-хрватски речник варијаната (иначица), Serbo-Croatian Dictionary of variants (inacica), 1989. And 1994.

=== Anthologies ===
- Najkraće drame na svetu (The shortest plays in the World, short dramas, KOV, Vršac, 1999)
- Kratke kraće i najkraće drame na svetu (Short, shorter and shortest plays in the world, short dramas, KOV, Vršac, 2008)

== Awards ==
- Two Sterija Awards, awarded by Sterijino pozorje, for newspaper theater critics and for special merits in the promotion of theater arts.
- The Statuette of Joakim Vujić, awarded by Knjaževsko-srpski teatar in Kragujevac (1990)
- Foundation "Braća Karić" Award, for journalism
- October Award of Belgrade, for lifetime achievement
- Order of "Knight of Art and Literature", awarded by France, 1992
- Sretenje Order, awarded by Serbia, 2012
