= Ljubomir Simović =

Serbian poet (1935–2025)

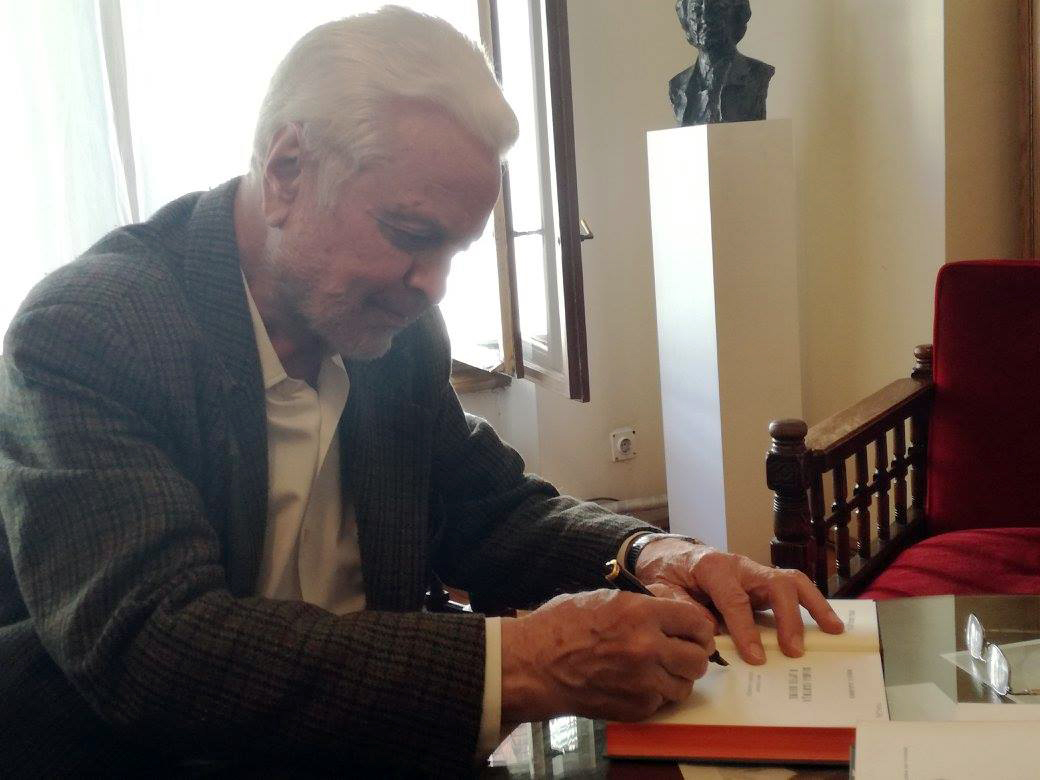
- Simović signing a book in 2017
- Born: 2 December 1935; Užice, Drina Banovina, Kingdom of Yugoslavia
- Died: 17 April 2025 (aged 89); Belgrade, Serbia
- Occupations: Poet and writer

Ljubomir Simović (Serbian Cyrillic: Љубомир Симовић; 2 December 1935 – 17 April 2025) was a Serbian writer, playwright, scriptwriter and academic. He was a member of the Serbian Academy of Sciences and Arts. His works have been translated in more than twenty languages.

== Life and career ==
Simović was born in the town of Užice, where he finished Gymnasium and Teacher's school. He graduated from the Faculty of Philology (Department of History of Serbian and Yugoslav Literature) at the University of Belgrade. He wrote poems, novels, essays, literary criticism, but he is best known for his plays. He wrote four plays: Hasanaginica, A Miracle in Sargan (Serbian: Čudo u Šarganu), Traveling theatre Sopalovic (Serbian: Putujuće pozorište Šopalović) and The Battle of Kosovo (Serbian: Boj na Kosovu). His works have been translated into almost all European languages and his plays were performed in almost all theatres in Serbia. Also his plays were performed in France, Hungary, the Czech Republic, Germany, Switzerland, Slovenia, Russia, Bosnia and Herzegovina, Poland, Belgium, Croatia, North Macedonia, Canada, Mexico, and Morocco.

In 1996 he published "A chronicle, which is occasionally a novel, or a novel, which is occasionally a chronicle" about his hometown called "Užice with the Crows" (Serbian: Užice sa vranama).

His selected works have been published in 12 books in 2008.

Simović died on 17 April 2025, at the age of 89.

== Works ==
- Slovenske elegije, (1958)
- Veseli grobovi, (1961)
- Poslednja zemlja, (1964)
- Šlemovi, (1967)
- Uoči trećih petlova, (1972)
- Hasanaga's Wife, (1974)
- Miracle in Šargan, (1975)
- Subota, (1976)
- Vidik na dve vode, (1980)
- Um za morem, (1982)
- Deset obraćanja Bogorodici Trojeručici hilandarskoj, (1983)
- Duplo dno, (1983)
- Istočnice, (1983)
- Snevnik I-II, (1987)
- Gornji grad, (1990)
- Kovanica na Čakovina, (1990)
- Duplo dno, eseji o pesnicima, (1991)
- Igla i konac, (1992)
- Galop na puževima, (1994)
- Uzice with the Crows, (1996)
- Ljuska od jajeta, (1998)
- Snevnik, dnevnik snova, (1998)
- Novi galop na puževima, (1999)
- Duplo dno, eseji o srpskim pesnicima, o komedijama Sterije i Nušića, i o Životu i priključenijima Dositejevim, (2001)
- Čitanje slika, eseji o slikarima i vajarima, (2006)
- Kina: čitanje spaljenih knjiga, (2007)
- Planeta Dunav, (2009)
- Do Oba i Huangpua, (2016)
- Žabe u redu pred poktivačnicom, (2016)

== Awards ==
- Isidora Sekulić Award
- Sterija Award for Hasanaginica (1975), A Miracle in Sargan (1993) and Traveling theatre Sopalovic (1986)
- Honorable doctor of arts, University of Kragujevac
- Dis Award
- Dositej Obradović Award
- Vasko Popa Award
- Milan Rakić Award
- Desanka Maksimović Award
- Mića Popović Award
- Đorđe Jovanović Award
- Branko Miljković Award
- Stefan Mitrov Ljubiša Award
- Ljubomir Nenadović Award
- Zmaj Award
- Jovan Dučić Award
- October Award
- 7 July Award
- Despot Stefan Lazarević Award
