= Atelje 212 =

Theatre in Belgrade, Serbia

- Атеље 212
- Official logo

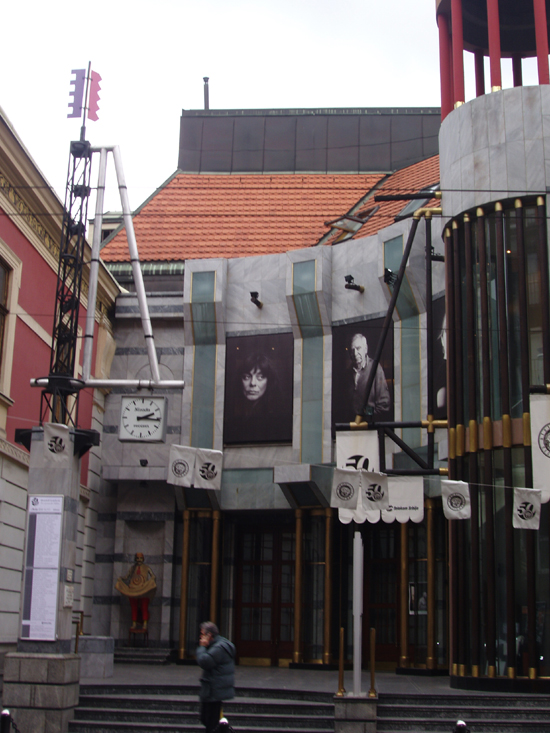
- Atelje 212 entrance, with Zoran Radmilović's statue in front
- Interactive map of Atelje 212
- Address: Svetogorska 21
- Location: Belgrade, Serbia
- Coordinates: 44°48′51″N 20°28′05″E
- Owner: City of Belgrade
- Capacity: 386 (Main scene); 141 ("Theatre in basement" scene)
- Type: Theatre

Construction
- Built: 1956
- Opened: 12 November 1956; 69 years ago
- Renovated: 1992

Website
- www.atelje212.rs

Atelje 212 (Serbian Cyrillic: Атеље 212) is a theatre located in Belgrade, Serbia.

Established in 1956 on the premises of the Borba building in front of 212 chairs, its opening play was the staging of Johann Wolfgang von Goethe's Faust directed by Mira Trailović.

== History ==
Although the theater's official inauguration took place on 12 November 1956, various plays had already been staged throughout 1956 by the same group of individuals. The most notable such staging was the summer 1956 semi-clandestine performance of Samuel Beckett's Waiting for Godot—a play that had been banned in all Communist countries—in front of some forty people on a ramshackle makeshift stage in painter Mića Popović's private atelier. The concealed performance came on the heels of a Godot staging in the Belgrade Drama Theatre (BDP)—that had been prepared by theater director Vasilije Popović with Ljuba Tadić, Rade Marković, Bata Paskaljević, Mića Tomić, and Tatjana Lukjanova among the cast—getting banned one year earlier. After the makeshift performance, later that year, the troupe grew into a theater that got its home in the Borba building. On 17 December 1956, at the theater's new location, Godot had a proper premiere, marking the very first performance of the controversial play to be open to the general public in post-World War II Eastern Europe.

Right from its inception, Atelje 212 became known for its avant-garde repertoire, staging playwrights such as Jean-Paul Sartre, Eugène Ionesco, Alfred Jarry, Murray Schisgal, Arthur Kopit, Jean Genet, etc.

Atelje 212's first theater managers were Radoš Novaković and Bojan Stupica. Initially, Mira Trailović performed the assistant manager duties before assuming the manager role herself. After a few years as tenant in the Borba building, the theater moved to its new home—a building designed by Bojan Stupica on Lole Ribara Street. Over the years, the building went through several major renovations, including the addition of a retractable roof that gets opened in the summer months.

In addition to the box office revenue, Atelje 212 is financed through the City of Belgrade subsidies which, as of 2011, amount to ~€1 million. In 2016, the theater celebrated its 60th anniversary.

Atelje 212 is among the most visited theaters and most expensive in Belgrade. As of 2018, it has 34 permanent actors and actresses, and like in the past, actors from other Belgrade's theaters come to play.

== See also ==
- List of theatres in Serbia
