= Belgrade Drama Theatre =

Theater in Belgrade, Serbia

- Београдско драмско позориште
- Official logo

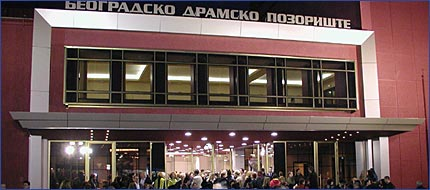
- Belgrade Drama Theatre main entrance

- Location within Belgrade
- Address: Mileševska 64a
- Location: Belgrade, Serbia
- Coordinates: 44°47′50.6″N 20°29′08.2″E
- Type: Theatre

Construction
- Opened: August 1947; 79 years ago

Website
- www.bdp.rs

The Belgrade Drama Theatre (Serbian Cyrillic: Београдско драмско позориште; abbr. BDP) is a theatre located in Belgrade, the capital of Serbia.

== History ==
Belgrade Drama Theatre was founded in August 1947, and it was the first city theater formed in Belgrade after the Second World War. The first opening night of "The Youth of the Fathers" by Boris Gorbatov staged by Petar S. Petrović was performed on the stage on 20 February 1948. The theater, currently located in a building on Crveni Krst, was opened in the season of 1948/49. On 20 March 1949, the theater hosted its opening night performance of "Sumnjivo lice" by Branislav Nušić, produced by Bosnian Salko Repak. In the period from 1959 to 1975, Belgrade Drama Theatre, with Belgrade Comedy, combined to be one theater house - "Contemporary Theater", and in December 1975, it became the Belgrade Drama Theatre again.

In the mid-1950s through the early 1960s, Belgrade Drama Theater had its "golden" period, mostly owing to successful performances of the works of contemporary American playwrights and a cast of actors, stage managers, stage designers, and costume designers, who made the reputation of the stage on Crveni Krst. The performances of Death of a Salesman, Cat on a Hot Tin Roof, The Glass Menagerie, Mother Courage and Her Children, A View from the Bridge and other contemporary classics came near the cult status among the theatergoers.

In the spring of 2003, a thorough reconstruction of the theater building was completed, bringing it to the level of high European standards.

As of 2010, Belgrade Drama Theatre is among the most popular theaters in Belgrade. It has a seating capacity of 495 seats. Today, Belgrade Drama Theatre works with a repertory artistic company and carries on the tradition created by performances of the classic and avant-garde dramatic literature, whereby it has created and maintained its recognizable style and artistic expression.

== See also ==
- List of theatres in Serbia
