= Sterijino pozorje =

Theater festival in Serbia (and formerly Yugoslavia)

Sterijino pozorje (Serbian Cyrillic: Стеријино позорје) is an annual theater festival held since 1956 in the Serbian National Theater in Novi Sad, featuring the national theaters of Serbia and previously Yugoslavia. It is the most prestigious theater festival in the country.

The festival was named after playwright Jovan Sterija Popović. It is typically held in late May, and lasts 3 to 5 days, featuring up to a dozen plays in the competitive program and several plays in auxiliary program Krugovi (Circles). The Sterija Awards are given out for the best play; original text; main and supporting roles in women's and men's category; directing; scenography; costume; music; as well as a special award.
