= Belgrade International Theatre Festival =

Theatre festival in Serbia

BITEF
- БИТЕФ
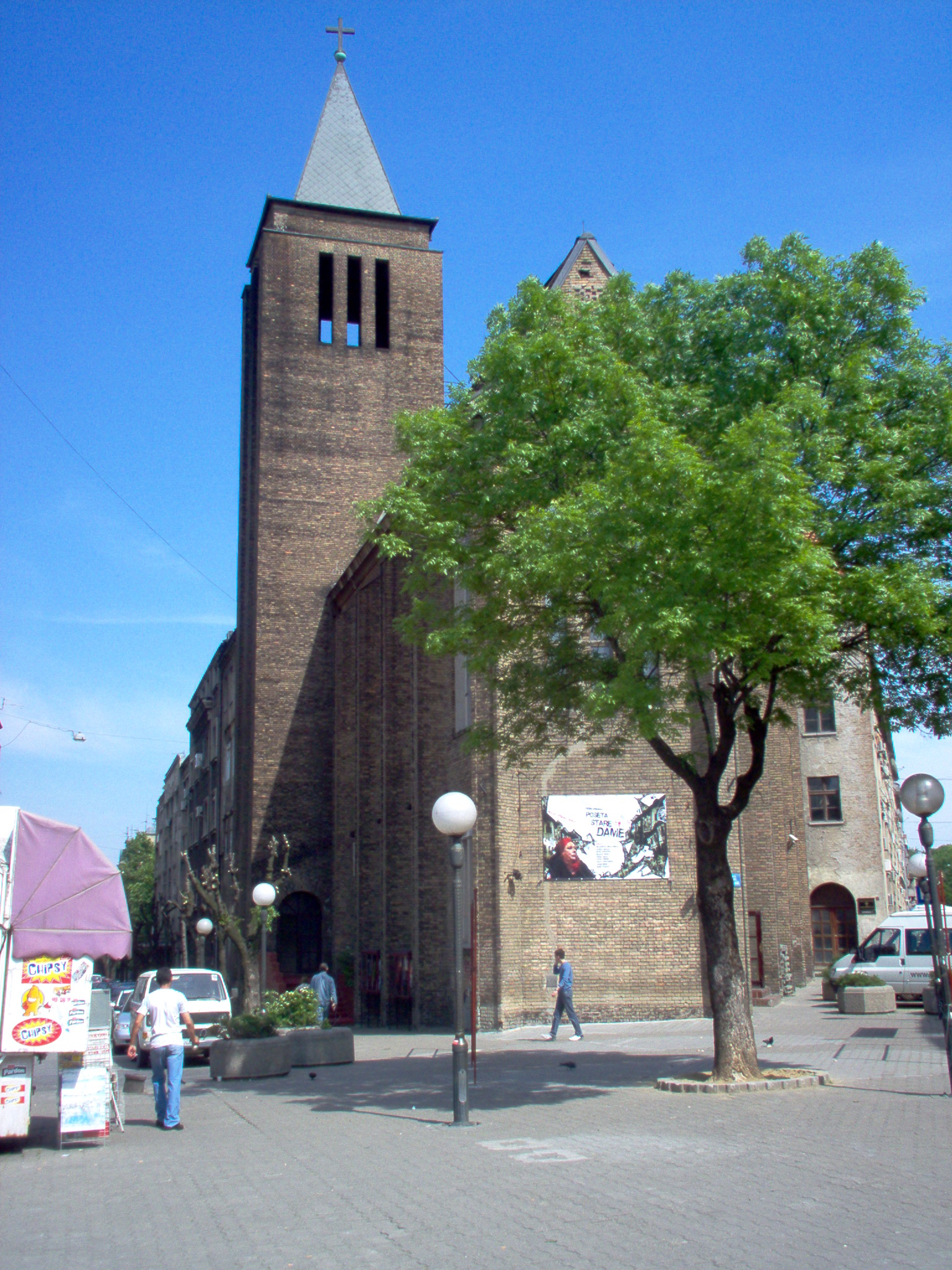
- BITEF Theatre

- Location within Belgrade
- Former names: Belgrade International Theatre Festival
- Address: Terazije 29/1
- Location: Stari Grad, Belgrade, Serbia
- Coordinates: 44.818140°N 20.468389°E
- Type: Theatre

Construction
- Opened: 1967; 59 years ago

Website
- www.bitef.rs

The Belgrade International Theatre Festival (abbr. BITEF) is a theatre festival that takes place every September annually in Belgrade, Serbia.

== History ==
Founded in 1967, BITEF has continually followed and supported the latest theatre trends. It has become one of the most significant culture festivals of Serbia.

During the 1960s, the founders of this festival (Mira Trailović, Jovan Ćirilov and their associates) promote avant-garde explorations. In the 1980s, BITEF showed Belgrade the highest reaches of the art of theatre, thus becoming one of the few festivals comprising both experimental forms and significant classic achievements. In spite of political-economic crisis and embargo, in the final decade of the 20th century, BITEF, thanks to the help of international culture centres, government and non-government organizations, managed to keep abreast with the rest of world, through promotion of new theatre trends and ultimate theatre values.

In 2000, BITEF was awarded a Special Prize by the Jury of the Europe Theatre Prize, in Taormina. BITEF was the first international theatre festival to receive an award from Premio Europa per il Teatro.

== Jury ==
Important part of every edition of the BITEF festival is the jury. Since the beginning, BITEF has a competitive character, which is why the role of the jury is very important. Members of the jury are important theater creators from former Yugoslavia and the rest of the world.

List of jury members for each edition of BITEF:

1st BITEF: Predrag Bajčetić, Dejan Čavić, Jovan Ćirilov, Ljubomir Draškić Boro Drašković, Borislav Mihajlović - Mihiz, Slobodan Selenić, Mira Trailović, Mlađa Veselinović

2nd BITEF: Predrag Bajčetić, Dejan Čavić, Jovan Ćirilov, Borislav Mihajlović - Mihiz, Muharem Pervić, Mira Trailović, Milan Žmukić

3rd BITEF: Ljubomir Draškić, Hugo Klajn, Borislav Mihajlović - Mihiz, Borka Pavićević, Miodrag Pavlović, Branko Pleša, Slobodan Selenić, Pavle Stefanović, Mira Trailović, Stojan Čelić, Jovan Ćirilov, Jovan Hristić

4th BITEF: Stanislav Bajić, Predrag Bajčetić, Borislav Mihajlović - Mihiz, Slobodan Selenić, Muharem Pervić, Mira Trailović, Jovan Ćirilov, Jovan Hristić

5th BITEF: Milenko Maričić, Vasko Popa, Zoran Ratković, Pavle Stefanović, Ljuba Tadić, Milorad Vučelić

6th BITEF: Jovan Hristić, Dušan Makavejev, Miodrag Pavlović, Zoran Radmilović, Vladimir Stamenković, Ljuba Tadić, Milorad Vučelić

7th BITEF: Muharem Pervić, Milosav Buca Mirković, Petar Volk, Vladimir Stamenković, Feliks Pašić, Lojze Smasek, Božidar Božović, Žarko Komanin, Ognjen Lakićević, Dejan Penčić-Poljanski

8th BITEF: Predrag Bajčetić, Miroslav Belović, Ljubomir Draškić, Boro Drašković, Tatjana Lukjanova, Ljiljana Krstić, Jelisaveta Sablić, Petar Slovenski, Ružica Sokić, Stevo Žigon

9th BITEF: Mirjana Miočinović, Milosav Buca Mirković, Borka Pavićević, Branko Pleša, Slobodan Selenić, Vladimir Stamenković, Jovan Hristić

10th BITEF: Eli Finci, Muharem Pervić, Dejan Penčić-Poljanski, Slobodan Selenić, Vladimir Stamenković

11th BITEF: Jovan Hristić, Dalibor Foretić, Milosav Buca Mirković, Feliks Pašić, Veno Taufer

12th BITEF: France Jamnik, Jovan Hristić, Dalibor Foretić, Feliks Pašić, Mirjana Miočinović

13th BITEF: Petar Salem, Lojze Smasek, Milorad Vučelić, Slobodan Selenić, Dragan Klaić

14th BITEF: Branko Pleša, Boro Drašković, Olga Jevrić, Dragan Klaić, Dejan Mijač, Ksenija Šukuljević

15th BITEF: Aleksandar Saša Petrović, Filip David, Ljiljana Krstić, Vladan Radosavljević

16th BITEF: Milka Podrug-Kokotović, Miroslava Otašević, Arsenije Jovanović, Slobodan Stojanović, Goran Stefanovski

17th BITEF: Mira Banjac, Borka Pavićević, Nenad Prokić, Slobodan Selenić, László Végel

18th BITEF: Slobodan Glumac, Dubravka Knežević, Branka Krilović, Paolo Magelli, Vladimir Stamenković

19th BITEF: Velimir Lukić, Lada Martinec, Aleksandar Popović, Ivica Kunčević, Zlatko Sviben

20th BITEF: Vladimir Jevtović, Dejan Mijač, Miodrag Pavlović, Nenad Prokić, Jelisaveta Sablić

21st BITEF: Petar Banićević, Petar Brečić, Nenad Ilić, Ljubomir Simović

22nd BITEF: Predrag Ejdus, Anatolij Kudrajcev, Slobodan Mašić, Haris Pašović, Dragoslav Srejović

23rd BITEF: Slobodan Blagojević, Dubravka Knežević, Egon Savin, Ivana Vujić, Dalibor Foretić

24th BITEF: Dragan Klaić, Boro Drašković, Branislav Lečić, Jovan Ristić Rica, Dubravka Ugrešić

25th BITEF: Vida Ognjenović, Mario Maskareli, Predrag Perović, Lidija Pilipenko, Gorčin Stojanović

26th BITEF: Slobodan Novaković, Dara Džokić, Jagoš Marković

27th BITEF: Cvijeta Mesić, Goran Marković, Irfan Mensur, Aleksandar Milosavljević, Mileta Prodanović

28th BITEF: Tanja Bošković, Jerko Denegri, Mladen Popović, Ivana Stefanović, Alisa Stojanović

29th BITEF: Dejan Mijač, Nebojša Dugalić, Srđan Hofman, Vladimir Kopicl, Ognjenka Milićević

30th BITEF: Roman Grigorijevič-Viktjuk, Isidora Minić, Boro Drašković, Nenad Prokić, Hermann Theissenn

31st BITEF: Milorad Pavić, Nikolay Kolyada, Arthur D. Skelton, Biljana Srbljanović, Goran Stefanovski

32nd BITEF: Heinz Klunker, Mira Erceg, Branislava Liješević, Svetlana Vragova, Ivan Medenica

33rd BITEF: Mario Mattia Giorgetti, Natalija Vagapova, Jelena Šantić, Dijana Milošević, Svetislav Jovanov

34th BITEF: Renate Klett, Marina Davydova, Nina Kiraly, Sonja Vukićević, Anja Suša

35th BITEF: Ivica Buljan, Tomaž Toporišič, Roman Dolžanski, Milena Marković, Miško Šuvaković

36th BITEF: Milorad Mišković, Annie Dorsen, Rudy Engelander, Nikita Milivojević, Isidora Stanišić

37th BITEF: Pamela Howard, Milena Bogavac, Igor Bojović, Audronis Liuga, Elie Malka, Alisa Stojanović, Johanna Tomek

38th BITEF: Michael Coveney, Predrag Miki Manojlović, Marija Janković, Milica Konstantinović, Suzanne Osten

39th BITEF: Ian Herbert, Đurđija Cvetić, Ksenija Viktorovna Dragunska, Dušan Makavejev, Uglješa Šajtinac

40th BITEF: Dino Mustafić, Miloš Sofrenović, Daša Kovačević, Igor Đorđević, Egon Savin

41st BITEF: Tomi Janežič, Miloš Lolić, Olga Stanislavovna Mukhina, Milica Tomić, Kristian Seltun, Laszlo Upor

42nd BITEF: Hans-Thies Lehmann, Mia David, Marija Karaklajić, Constanza Macras, Katarina Pejović

43rd BITEF: Patrice Pavis, Roland Schimmelpfennig, Vladimir Aleksić, Oliver Frljić, Maja Pelević

44th BITEF: Nataša Rajković, Bojan Đorđev, Elena Kovalskaya, Damjan Kecojević, Gianina Carbunariu

45th BITEF: Arthur Sonnen, Anna Lengyel, Alja Predan, Vladica Milosavljević, Nikola Zavišić

46th BITEF: Goran Injac, Jean Pierre Thibodeau, Elizabeth Schak, Đurđa Tešić, Maja Mirković

47th BITEF: Christian Holtzhauer, Yana Ross, Igor Ružić, András Urbán, Filip Vujošević

48th BITEF: Ana Tomović, Lilach Dekel-Avner, Periša Perišić, Ulla Kasius, Witold Mrozek

49th BITEF: Mirjana Karanović, Žarko Laušević, Agnieszka Jakimiak, Stefan Blaeske

50th BITEF: Yun-Cheol Kim, Femi Osofisan, Aleksandra Jovićević, Aleksandar Denić, Tomas Irmer

51st BITEF: Marija Ševcova, Margareta Sorensen, Ivana Sajko, Igor Koruga, Draško Adžić

52nd BITEF: Judit Csaki, Bryce Leace, Bojana Mladenović, Aleksandra Janković, Radmila Vojvodić

53rd BITEF: Christine Hamon-Sirejols, Dorothy Chansky, Sanja Mitrović, Olga Dimitrijević, Ersan Mondtag

54th & 55th BITEF: Şermin Langhoff, Lucia Van Heteren, Agata Juniku, Cecilia Djurberg, Jovana Tomić

56th BITEF: Stefanie Carp, Christine Doessel, Selma Spahić, Vanja Ejdus, Dino Pešut

== List of award-winning performances ==
	Performance	Author	Theatre	Town, Country	Awards
1st Bitef 1967	The Constant Prince	Jerzy Grotowski	Teatar Laboratorium	Wrocław, Poland	Grand Prix
1st Bitef 1967	Troilus and Cressida	David Esrig	Teatrul de comedie	Bucharest, Romania	Grand Prix
1st Bitef 1967	Three sisters	Otomar Krejča	Divadlo za branou	Prague, Czechoslovakia	Grand Prix
2nd Bitef 1968	Car Cemetery	Víctor García	Compagnie Víctor García	Paris, France	Grand Prix and Audience Award
2nd Bitef 1968	The Smug Citizens	Georgij Tovstonogov	Gorky Bolshoi Drama Theater	Leningrad, The Union of Soviet Socialist Republics	Grand Prix
2nd Bitef 1968	The Daughter-in-Law	Peter Gill	The English Stage Company in The Royal Court	London, United Kingdom	Grand Prix
3rd Bitef 1969	Dionysus in '69	Richard Schechner	The Performance Group	New York, United States of America	Special Award
3rd Bitef 1969	The Frenzy of Orlando	Luca Ronconi	Teatro libero	Rome, Italy	Grand Prix and Audience Award
3rd Bitef 1969	The Cry of the People for Meat	Peter Schumann	Bread and Puppet Theater	Vermont, United States of America	Special Award
3rd Bitef 1969	Saved	William Gaskill	English Stage Company in The Royal Court	London, United Kingdom	Special Award
3rd Bitef 1969	The Maids	Víctor García	La Compania Nuria Espert	Barcelona, Spain	Special Award
4th Bitef 1970	Zodiac, Three Duets, Cell	William Louther, Paul Taylor, Robert Cohan	London Contemporary Dance Theatre	London, United Kingdom	Audience Award
4th Bitef 1970	Ivanov	Otomar Krejča	Divadlo za Branou	Prague, Czechoslovakia	Grand Prix
4th Bitef 1970	Philoktet	Hans Lietzau	Deutsches Schauspielhaus Hamburg	Hamburg, Federal Republic of Germany	Grand Prix
4th Bitef 1970	A Dream Play	Ingmar Bergman	Kungliga Dramatiska Teatern	Stockholm, Sweden	Grand Prix
5th Bitef 1971	Mutations	Joseph Chaikin	The Open Teatre	New York, United States of America	Grand Prix
5th Bitef 1971	Terminal	Joseph Chaikin,	The Open Teatre	New York, United States of America	Grand Prix
5th Bitef 1971	Real Reel	Jean-Paul Ferbus, Frederic Flamand	Théâtre Laboratoire Vicinal	Brusells, Belgium	Grand Prix
5th Bitef 1971	Performance of Hamlet in the Village Mrduša Donja Municipality Blatuša	Božidar Violić	Teatar ITD	Zagreb, Yugoslavia	Audience Award
5th Bitef 1971	1789	Ariane Mnouchkine	Théâtre du Soleil	Paris, France	Grand Prix
5th Bitef 1971	Jashumon	Shuji Terayama	Tenjo Sajiki	Tokyo, Japan	Grand Prix
6th Bitef 1972	Rain Forest, Signals, TV Rerun	Merce Cunningham	Merce Cunningham & Dance Co.	New York, United States of America	Grand Prix
6th Bitef 1972	The Monument G	Dušan Jovanović	Eksperimentalno gledališće Glej	Ljubljana, Yugoslavia	Special Award
6th Bitef 1972	Orestea	Luca Ronconi	Teatro Cooperativa Tuscolano	Rome, Italy	Grand Prix
6th Bitef 1972	Torquato Tasso	Peter Stein	Schaubühne am Halleschen Ufer	West Berlin, Federal Republic of Germany	Grand Prix
6th Bitef 1972	A Midsummer Night's Dream	Peter Brook	The Royal Shakespeare Company	Stratford, United Kingdom	Audience Award
7th Bitef 1973	Three Venetian Twins	David Esrig	Teatrul National	Bucharest, Romania	Special Award
7th Bitef 1973	Lear	Hans Lietzau	Schiller Teater	West Berlin, Federal Republic of Germany	Grand Prix and Audience Award
7th Bitef 1973	My Father’s House	Eugenio Barba	Odin Teatret	Holstebro, Denmark	Grand Prix
7th Bitef 1973	Fracasse	Marcel Maréchal	Compagnie du Cothurne	Lyon, France	Special Award
7th Bitef 1973	Stallerhof	Ulrich Helsing, Karl Kneidel	Deutsches Schauspielhaus	Hamburg, Federal Republic of Germany	Grand Prix
8th Bitef 1974	Happy Days or Tarkelin’s Death	Branko Pleša	The Yugoslav Drama Theatre	Belgrade, Yugoslavia	Grand Prix
8th Bitef 1974	Don Juan	Anatoly Efros	Moscow Drama Theater on Malaya Bronnaya	Moscow, The Union of Soviet Socialist Republics	Grand Prix and Audience Award
8th Bitef 1974	Liberation	Konrad Swinarski	Stary Theatre	Krakow, Poland	Grand Prix
8th Bitef 1974	Till Damascus	Ingmar Bergman	Kungliga Dramatiska Teatern	Stockholm, Sweden	Grand Prix
9th Bitef 1975	Le Tartuffe	Roger Planchon	Théâtre National Populaire	Villeurbanne, France	Grand Prix
9th Bitef 1975	The Trojan Women, Electra	Andrei Serban	La Mama Repertory Company	New York, United States of America	Grand Prix and Audience Award
9th Bitef 1975	I	Anne West	Théâtre Laboratoire	Brusells, Belgium	Special Award
9th Bitef 1975	Summerfolk	Peter Stein	Schaubühne Am Halleschen Ufer	West Berlin, Federal Republic of Germany	Grand Prix
10th Bitef 1976	Hamlet	Yuri Lyubimov	Taganka Theatre	Moscow, The Union of Soviet Socialist Republics	Grand Prix
10th Bitef 1976	The Ik	Peter Brook	Le Centre International de Créations Théâtrales	Paris, France	Grand Prix
10th Bitef 1976	Einstein On the Beach	Robert Wilson	Byrd Hoffman Fondation	New York, United States of America	Grand Prix
10th Bitef 1976	Opera White Horse	Peter Schumann	Bread And Puppet Theatre	Vermont, United States of America	Audience Award
11th Bitef 1977	The Dead Class	Tadeusz Kantor	Teatr Cricot 2	Krakow, Poland	Grand Prix
11th Bitef 1977	Hedda Gabler	Niels Peter Rudolph	Schiller Theater	West Berlin, Federal Republic of Germany	Grand Prix
11th Bitef 1977	Salomé	Lindsay Kemp	The Lindsay Kemp Company	London, United Kingdom	Audience Award
11th Bitef 1977	Bluebeard	Pina Bausch	Wupperthaler Bühnen	Wuppertal, Federal Republic of Germany	Grand Prix and Politika Award
12th Bitef 1978	The Tragicall Historie of Hamlet, Prince of Denmarke	Benno Besson	Volksbühne	East Berlin, German Democratic Republic	Grand Prix
12th Bitef 1978	The Father	Günter Krämer	Schiller Theater	West Berlin, Federal Republic of Germany	Grand Prix; Politika Award and Audience Award
12th Bitef 1978	Soft ships	The joint work of members	Kugla glumište	Zagreb, Yugoslavia	Special Award
12th Bitef 1978	The Miraculous mandarin	Kató Szönyi	Bábszinház	Budapest, Hungary	Grand Prix
13th Bitef 1979	Cyclop	Roberto Ciuili	Schauspielhaus	Düsseldorf, Federal Republic of Germany	Grand Prix and Politika Award
13th Bitef 1979	Cruel Garden	Lindsay Kemp	The Ballet Rambert	London, United Kingdom	Audience Award
13th Bitef 1979	Andy Warhol's Last Love	The joint work of members of the Squat Theatre	Squat Theatre	New York, United States of America	Grand Prix
13th Bitef 1979	You've got to Live with It	The joint work of members of the Werkteater	Werkteater	Amsterdam, Netherlands	Grand Prix
14th Bitef 1980	Aus dem Fremde	Ellen Hammer	Schaubühne Am Halleschen Ufer	West Berlin, Federal Republic of Germany	Grand Prix
14th Bitef 1980	Sumrak	Jerzy Jarocki	The Yugoslav Drama Theatre	Belgrade, Yugoslavia	Politika Award
14th Bitef 1980	Aboriginal Australians	Djoli Laiwanga	Aboriginal Dance of Arnhem Land	Australia	Special Award
15th Bitef 1981	Missa in A Minor	Ljubiša Ristić	Slovensko Mladinsko Gledališče	Ljubljana, Yugoslavia	Grand Prix and Politika Award
15th Bitef 1981	A Midsummer Night's Dream	Lindsay Kemp	Lindsay Kemp Company	London, United Kingdom	Special Award
15th Bitef 1981	Pieszo	Jerzy Jarocki	Teatr Dramaticzny	Warsaw, Poland	Special Award
16th Bitef 1982	Kinkan Shonen	Ushio Amagatsu	Sankai Juku	Tokyo, Japan	Special Award
16th Bitef 1982	Dantons Tod	Alexander Lang	Deutsches Theater	East Berlin, German Democratic Republic	Grand Prix
16th Bitef 1982	Marat-Sade	Janos Asc	Csiky Gergely Szinhàz	Kapošvar, Hungary	Grand Prix; Politika Award and Audience Award
17th Bitef 1983	End of Europe	Janusz Wiśniewski	Teatr Nowy	Poznan, Poland	Grand Prix
17th Bitef 1983	A Midsummer Night's Dream	Roberto Ciulli	Theater an der Ruhr	Mülheim, Federal Republic of Germany	Special Award
17th Bitef 1983	Big and Small	Helmuth Schäfer, Roberto Ciulli	Theater an der Ruhr	Mülheim, Federal Republic of Germany	Special Award
18th Bitef 1984	Le Pouvoir de Folies Théâtrales	Jan Fabre	Projekt 3	Antwerp, Belgium	Special Award and Politika Award
19th Bitef 1985	Sylvia Plath	Johann Kresnik	Theater der Stadt Heidelberg	Heidelberg, Federal Republic of Germany	Grand Prix
19th Bitef 1985	The Lower Depths	Anatoly Efros	Taganka Theatre	Moscow, The Union of Soviet Socialist Republics	Grand Prix and Politika Award
19th Bitef 1985	The Cherry Orchard	Anatoly Efros	Taganka Theatre	Moscow, The Union of Soviet Socialist Republics	Grand Prix
20th Bitef 1986	Macbeth	Makoto Sato	Youki-Za	Tokyo, Japan	Special Award
20th Bitef 1986	Miss Julie	Ingmar Bergman	Kungliga Dramatiska Teatern	Stockholm, Sweden	Grand Prix and Politika Award
20th Bitef 1986	Oxyrhynchus Evangeliet	Eugenio Barba	Odin teatret	Holstebro, Denmark	Grand Prix
21st Bitef 1987	Three Sisters	Tamás Ascher	Katona József Szinház	Budapest, Hungary	Grand Prix
21st Bitef 1987	Crime and Punishment	Andrzej Wajda	Stary Theatre	Krakow, Poland	Grand Prix and Audience Award
21st Bitef 1987	The Awakening of the Spring	Haris Pašović	The Yugoslav Drama Theatre	Belgrade, Yugoslavia	Special Award
22nd Bitef 1988	Uncle Vanya	Eimuntas Nekrošius	Valstybinis jaunimo teatras	Vilnius, The Union of Soviet Socialist Republics	Special Award and Politika Award
22nd Bitef 1988	Suz(O)Suz	Collective	La Fura Dels Baus	Barcelona, Spain	Grand Prix and Politika Award
23rd Bitef 1989	Šeherezada	Tomaž Pandur, Maja Milenković Workman	Slovensko Mladinsko Gledališče	Ljubljana, Yugoslavia	Special Award
23rd Bitef 1989	Revizor	Zsámbéki Gábor	Katona Józef Szinház	Budapest, Hungary	Grand Prix
23rd Bitef 1989	Caspar	Roberto Ciulli	Theater an der Ruhr	Mülheim, Federal Republic of Germany	Grand Prix; Politika Award and Audience Award
24th Bitef 1990	The Fall of Icarus	Frédéric Flamand	Plan K	Brusells, Belgium	Grand Prix Mira Trailović
24th Bitef 1990	Faust	Tomaž Pandur, Maja Milenković Workman	Drama SNG	Maribor, Yugoslavia	Grand Prix Mira Trailović
24th Bitef 1990	The Maids	Roman Viktyuk	Satyricon Theatre	Moscow, The Union of Soviet Socialist Republics	Audience Award and Special Award
25th Bitef 1991	Immer dasselbe Gelogen	Wim Vandekeybus	Ultima Vez	Brusells, Belgium	Grand Prix Mira Trailović
25th Bitef 1991	Theatrical Illusion	Slobodan Unkovski	The Yugoslav Drama Theatre	Belgrade, Yugoslavia	Grand Prix "Mira Trailović"; Politika Award and Audience Award
26th Bitef 1992	Richard III	Ljubiša Ristić	National Theatre, KPGT	Subotica, Yugoslavia	Grand Prix Mira Trailović
26th Bitef 1992	Ubu Roi (Ubu the King)	Haris Pašović	National Theatre, KPGT	Subotica, Yugoslavia	Audience Award
26th Bitef 1992	Woyzek	András Urban	National Theatre, KPGT	Subotica, Yugoslavia	Special Award
27th Bitef 1993	Rider	Anton Adasinsky	Teatr Derevo	Saint-Petersburg, Russian Federation	Grand Prix "Mira Trailović" and Politika Award
27th Bitef 1993	Lažni car Šćepan Mali	Dejan Mijač	The Yugoslav Drama Theatre, ATL, Budva - City Theatre	Belgrade, Budva, Yugoslavia	Special Award
28th Bitef 1994	Angels Ex Machina	Sue-Ellen Kohler, William McClure	Stalker Stilt Theatre	Sydney, Australia	Special Award
28th Bitef 1994	In Concert	Joan Grau	Companya Semola teatro	Barcelona, Spain	Grand Prix Mira Trailović
28th Bitef 1994	Titanick	José van Tuijl	Theater Titanick	Cologne, Federal Republic of Germany	Grand Prix Mira Trailović
28th Bitef 1994	Hybrid	Joan Grau	Companya Semola teatro	Barcelona, Spain	Audience Award and Politika Award
29th Bitef 1995	Claustrophobia	Lev Dodin	Maly Theatre	Saint-Petersburg, Russian Federation	Grand Prix "Mira Trailović" and Politika Award
29th Bitef 1995	Assimil	Ljubiša Ristić, Threes Shreurs	KPGT	Amsterdam, Netherlands, Belgrade, Yugoslavia	Special Award
29th Bitef 1995	L'Anatomie du Fauve	József Nagy	Centre de Productiuon Choréographique	Orleans, France	Grand Prix Mira Trailović
29th Bitef 1995	How To Live	Nigel Charnock	Volcano theatre	Cardiff, United Kingdom	Grand Prix Mira Trailović
30th Bitef 1996	Pension Schöller: Die Schlacht	Frank Castorf	Volksbühne	Berlin, Federal Republic of Germany	Grand Prix Mira Trailović
30th Bitef 1996	Villa, Villa	-	De la Guarda	Buenos Aires, Argentina	Grand Prix Mira Trailović
30th Bitef 1996	The Three Lives of Lucie Cabrol	Simon McBurney	Théâtre de Complicité	London, United Kingdom	Grand Prix "Mira Trailović"; Politika Award and Audience Award
30th Bitef 1996	Silence Silence Silence	Vito Taufer	Slovensko Mladinsko Gledališče	Ljubljana, Slovenia	Special Award
31st Bitef 1997	7 for a Secret Never to be Told	Wim Vandekeybus	Ultima Vez	Brusells, Belgium	Grand Prix Mira Trailović
31st Bitef 1997	Who The Fuck Started All This	Aleksandar Popovski	Makedonski Naroden Teatar	Skopje, Republic of Macedonia	Grand Prix Mira Trailović
31st Bitef 1997	Adventure (Casanova)	Ivan Popovski	Atelier Fomenko	Moscow, Russian Federation	Grand Prix Mira Trailović
31st Bitef 1997	A Midsummer Night's Dream	Nikita Milivojević	National Theatre, Budva -City Theatre	Belgrade, Budva, Yugoslavia	Politika Award
31st Bitef 1997	Dimonis	Joan Font	Comediants	Barcelona, Spain	Special Award
32nd Bitef 1998	Die Verwandlung	Valery Fokin	Satyricion Theatre)	Moscow, Russian Federation	Special Award
32nd Bitef 1998	Murx den Europäer! Murx ihn! Murx ihn! Murx ihn! Murx ihn ab!	Christoph Marthaler	Volksbühne am Rosa Luxemburg-Platz	Berlin, Federal Republic of Germany	Grand Prix Mira Trailović
32nd Bitef 1998	Woyzeck	József Nagy	Centre Choreographique National	Orleans, France	Audience Award
33rd Bitef 1999	Mythos	Eugenio Barba	Odin theatre	Holstebro, Denmark	Grand Prix Mira Trailović
33rd Bitef 1999	The Tempest	Genrietta Yanovskaya	Moskovskiy Teatr Yunogo Zritelya	Moscow, Russian Federation	Special Award
33rd Bitef 1999	Fragile	Borut Šeparević	Montažstroj, Intercult	Zagreb, Croatia; Stockholm, Sweden	Audience Award
34th Bitef 2000	Bodies	Sasha Waltz	Schaubühne am Lehniner Platz	Berlin, Federal Republic of Germany	Grand Prix Mira Trailović
34th Bitef 2000	Crime and Punishment	Kama Ginkas	Moskovskiy Teatr Yunogo Zritelya	Moscow, Russian Federation	Special Award
34th Bitef 2000	Three Sisters	Andrej Žoldák	Ivan Franko National Academic Drama Theater	Kyiv, Ukraine	Politika Award
34th Bitef 2000	GOPF	Gregor Metzger, Martin Zimmermann	Metzger, Zimmerman, de Perrot	Zurich, Switzerland	Audience Award
35th Bitef 2001	Rien de Rien	Sidi Larbi Cherkaoui	Les Ballets C. de la B.	Ghent, Belgium	Special Award and Politika Award
35th Bitef 2001	Messiah	Steven Berkoff	S. Berkoff Co.	London, United Kingdom	Audience Award
35th Bitef 2001	School for Fools	Andrey Moguchy	Baltiskiy dom, Formalny Theatre	Saint-Petersburg, Russian Federation	Grand Prix Mira Trailović
36th Bitef 2002	Woyzeck	Robert Wilson	Betty Nansen Teatret	Copenhagen, Denmark	Grand Prix Mira Trailović
36th Bitef 2002	Requiem	Luigi de Angelis	Fanny & Alexander, Kulturfabrik Kampnagel; Ravenna Festival, Ravenna Teatro, CRT Milano	Hamburg, Federal Republic of Germany; Ravenna; Milano, Italy	Special Award
37th Bitef 2003	Extinction	Krystian Lupa	Teatr Dramatyczny	Warsaw, Poland	Grand Prix "Mira Trailović" and Audience Award
37th Bitef 2003	Nora	Thomas Ostermeier	Schaubuehne am Lehniner Platz	Berlin, Federal Republic of Germany	Politika Award
37th Bitef 2003	W-workers Circus	Arpád Schilling	Kretakor Szinhaz	Budapest, Hungary	Special Award
38th Bitef 2004	Eden	József Nagy	Bitef Theatre, Umetnička radionica “Kanjiški krug”	Belgrade, Kanjiža, Serbia and Montenegro	Politika Award
38th Bitef 2004	Romeo and Juliet	Oskaras Koršunovas	Oskaras Koršunovas Teatar	Vilnius, Lithuania	Special Award
38th Bitef 2004	War and Peace	Pyotr Fomenko	Pyotr Fomenko	Moscow, Russian Federation	Grand Prix Mira Trailović
38th Bitef 2004	The battle of Stalingrad	Revaz Gabriadze	Marionette Theatre	Tbilisi, Georgia	Audience Award
39th Bitef 2005	(Musee des phrases)	Heiner Goebbels	Theatre Vidy - Lausanne	Lausanne, Switzerland	Grand Prix "Mira Trailović" and Politika Award
39th Bitef 2005	Long Life	Alvis Hermanis	The New Riga Theatre	Riga, Latvia	Grand Prix Mira Trailović
39th Bitef 2005	Just for show	Lloyd Newson	DV8 Physical Theatre	London, United Kingdom	Special Award and Audience Award
40th Bitef 2006	I Only Appear to be Dead	Kristen Dehlholm	Hotel Pro Forma	Copenhagen, Denmark	Special Award
40th Bitef 2006	The Segual	Arpád Schilling	Kretakor Szinhaz	Budapest, Hungary	Grand Prix Mira Trailović
40th Bitef 2006	The Language of Walls	Guy Weizman, Roni Haver	Serbian National Theatre	Novi Sad, Serbia	Audience Award
40th Bitef 2006	Ballet for life	Maurice Bejart	Bejrt Ballet Lausanne	Lausanne, Switzerland	Politika Award
41st Bitef 2007	Brussels #04	Romeo Castellucci	Socìetas Raffaello Sanzio	Cesena, Italy	Grand Prix Mira Trailović
41st Bitef 2007	Puilija, Papa Pupilio and the Pupilceks - Reconstruction	Janez Janša	Maska	Ljubljana, Slovenia	Special Award
41st Bitef 2007	Ex-Position (Process _City02)	Boris Bakal	Shadow Casters	Zagreb, Croatia	Special Award
41st Bitef 2007	Macbeth	Jurgen Gosch	Schauspielhaus Düsseldorf	Düsseldorf, Federal Republic of Germany	Politika Award
41st Bitef 2007	Drunken Night in 1918	Lenka Udovički	Kazalište Ulysses	Brijuni, Croatia	Audience Award
42nd Bitef 2008	Platz mangel	Christoph Marthaler	Rote fabrik & die Produktion GmbH	Zurich; Basel, Switzerland	Politika Award
42nd Bitef 2008	Maybe forever	Meg Stuart, Philipp Gehmacher	Damaged Goods & Mumbling Fish	Brusells, Belgium; Vienna, Austria	Special Award
42nd Bitef 2008	Babydrama	Suzanne Osten	Unga Klara	Stockholm, Sweden	Audience Award
42nd Bitef 2008	Stifter’s Things (Stifter’s dinge)	Heiner Goebbels	Theatre Vidy	Lausanne, Switzerland	Grand Prix Mira Trailović
43rd Bitef 2009	The Blue Dragon	Robert Lepage	Ex Machina	Quebec, Canada	Politika Award
43rd Bitef 2009	The Enthusiasts	Miloš Lolić	The Yugoslav Drama Theatre	Belgrade, Serbia	Grand Prix Mira Trailović
43rd Bitef 2009	Vacation from history, (process_city, part 01)	Boris Bakal, Katarina Pejović	Shadow Casters	Zagreb, Croatia	Special Award
43rd Bitef 2009	Writer	Jo Strømgren	Urlike Quade	Bergen, Norway	Audience Award
44th Bitef 2010	Isabella’s Room and The Deer House	Jan Lauwers	Needcompany	Brusells, Belgium	Politika Award
44th Bitef 2010	Frankenstein -Project	Kornél Mundruczó	Kornél Mundruczó - Yvette Bíró	Budapest, Hungary	Special Award
44th Bitef 2010	Uncle Vanya	Jurgen Gosch	Deutsches Theater	Berlin, Federal Republic of Germany	Grand Prix "Mira Trailović" and Audience Award
45th Bitef 2011	Elijah’s chair	Boris Liješević	The Yugoslav Drama Theatre	Belgrade, Serbia	Grand Prix Mira Trailović
45th Bitef 2011	Untitled	Josef Nadj	RKA “Josef Nadj”	Belgrade, Serbia	Politika Award
45th Bitef 2011	To Moscow! To Moscow!	Frank Castorf	Volksbuhne	Berlin, Federal Republic of Germany	Audience Award
45th Bitef 2011	I went to the house but did not enter	Heiner Goebbels	Theatre Vidy	Lausanne, Switzerland	Special Award
46th Bitef 2012	I hate the truth	Oliver Frljić	Teatar &TD	Zagreb, Croatia	Special Award and Audience Award
46th Bitef 2012	Blood Wedding	Miloš Lolić	Münchner Volkstheater	Munich, Federal Republic of Germany	Politika Award
46th Bitef 2012	Children of the Sun	Ivo Van Hove	Toneelgroep	Amsterdam, Netherlands	Grand Prix Mira Trailović
47th Bitef 2013	55+	Borut Šeparović	Montažstroj	Zagreb, Croatia	Special Award
47th Bitef 2013	The Storm	Jernej Lorenci	Mestno gledalište Ljubljansko	Ljubljana, Slovenia	Politika Award
47th Bitef 2013	Zoran Đinđić	Oliver Frljić	Atelje 212	Belgrade, Serbia	Grand Prix Mira Trailović
47th Bitef 2013	The Segual	Tomi Janežić	Serbian National Theatre	Novi Sad, Serbia	Audience Award
48th Bitef 2014	Where's the Revolution, Scum?	Borut Šeparović, Nataša Mihoci	Montažstroj	Zagreb, Croatia	Special Award
48th Bitef 2014	Aleksandra Zec	Oliver Frljić	HDK Teatar	Zagreb, Croatia	Grand Prix Mira Trailović
48th Bitef 2014	Neoplanta	András Urbán	Novosadsko pozorište / Újvidéki Színház	Novi Sad, Serbia	Audience award and Politika award
49th Bitef 2015	The Iliad	Jernej Lorenci	Slovenian National Theatre Drama Ljubljana, Ljubljana City Theatre and Cankar Hall	Ljubljana, Slovenia	Audience award and Politika award
49th Bitef 2015	We Are Kings, Not Humans	Мatija Ferlin	Croatian National Theatre	Zagreb, Croatia	Special Award
49th Bitef 2015	Adieu	Jonathan Capdevielle	Bureau Cassiopée	Paris, France	Grand Prix Мira Trailović
50th Bitef 2016	The Ridiculous Darkness	Dušan David Pařízek	Burgtheater	Vienna, Austria	Grand Prix "Mira Trailović" and Politika Award
50th Bitef 2016	Suite Nº 2	Joris Lacoste	L'Encyclopédie de la parole and Joris Lacoste	Paris, France	Special Award "Jovan Ćirilov" and Audience Award
50th Bitef 2016	Riding on a Cloud	Rabih Мroué	Rabih Мroué	Beirut, Lebanon	Special Award Jovan Ćirilov*
51st Bitef 2017	Mount Olympus to Glorify the Cult of Tragedy – A 24h Performance,	Jan Fabre	Troubleyn/Jan Fabre	Antwerp, Belgium	Grand Prix "Mira Trailović"; Politika Award and Audience Award
51st Bitef 2017	Hearing	Amir Reza Koohestani / امیر رضا کوهستانی:	Mehr Theatre Group / گروه تئاتر مهر	Tehran, Iran	Special Award Jovan Ćirilov
52nd Bitef 2018	Nachlass, pièces sans personnes	Rimini Protokoll (Stefan Kaegi, Dominic Huber)	Theatre Vidy	Lausanne, Switzerland	Grand Prix "Mira Trailović" and Politika Award
52nd Bitef 2018	Eternal Russia	Marina Davydova Vera Martynov	HAU Hebbel am Ufer	Berlin, Federal Republic of Germany	Special Award Jovan Ćirilov
52nd Bitef 2018	Requiem for L.	Fabrizio Cassol Alain Platel	Les ballets C de la B	Ghent, Belgium	Special Award Jovan Ćirilov
52nd Bitef 2018	Suite N°3 ‘Europe’	Collective “Encyclopédie de la parole” Joris Lacoste Pierre-Yves Macé	Échelle 1:1,	Paris, France	Audience Award
53rd Bitef 2019	Ali: Fear Eats Your Soul	Sebastijan Horvat	Slovenian National Theatre Drama	Ljubljana, Slovenia	Grand Prix "Mira Trailović"; Politika Award and Audience Award
53rd Bitef 2019	Immoral Tales – Part 1: Mother House	Phia Menard and Jean-Luc Beaujault	Company Non Nova,	Nantes, France	Special Award Jovan Ćirilov *
54th & 55th Bitef 2021	Cement Belgrade	Milan Ramšak Marković and Sebastijan Horvat	Belgrade Drama Theatre	Belgrade, Serbia	Grand Prix Mira Trailović
54th & 55th Bitef 2021	Traces	Wim Vandekeybus	Ultima Vez	Brussels, Belgium	Politika Award
54th & 55th Bitef 2021	Farm Fatale	Philippe Quesne	Vivarium studio; Münchner Kammerspiele	Paris, France; Munich, Germany	Special Award Jovan Ćirilov
54th & 55th Bitef 2021	I Put a Spell on You	Ehsan Hemat and Roeland Luyten	2nd to the right	Brussels, Belgium Tehran, Iran	Grand Prix Mira Trailović
54th & 55th Bitef 2021	The Cherry Orchard in the Cherry Orchard	Bobo Jelčić	de facto theatre company	Zagreb, Croatia	Special Award "Jovan Ćirilov" and Politika Award
54th & 55th Bitef 2021	As if the End Were Not Quite Near,	Maja Pelević and Nikola Zavišić	Bitef Theatre	Belgrade, Serbia	Audience Award
56th Bitef 2022	Solo	Nina Rajić Kranjac, Nataša Keser, Benjamin Krnetić, Marko Mandić	Mladinsko Theatre and Maska	Ljubljana, Slovenia	Grand Prix Mira Trailović
56th Bitef 2022	Any attempt will end in crushed bodies and shattered bones	Jan Martens	Jan Martens / GRIP and Dance On Ensemble	Antwerp, Belgium	Grand Prix "Mira Trailović" and Politika Award
56th Bitef 2022	Love	Alexander Zeldin	Alexander Zeldin Company; Odéon-Théâtre de l’Europe,	London, United Kingdom; Paris, France	Special Award Jovan Ćirilov
56th Bitef 2022	World without Women	Maja Pelević and Olga Dimitrijević	Bitef Theatre and Centre for Cultural Decontamination	Belgrade, Serbia	Audience Award

== See also ==
- List of theatres in Serbia
