= Svetislav Stefanović (disambiguation) =

Svetislav Stefanović (1877–1944) was a Serbian physician and writer.

Svetislav Stefanović may also refer to:

- Svetislav Stefanović Ćeća (1910–1980), Serbian decorated war hero and Yugoslav interior minister
- Svetislav Stefanović Buca (1872–1916), Serbian National Theatre actor
