= Pavle Stefanović =

Serbian writer and philosopher

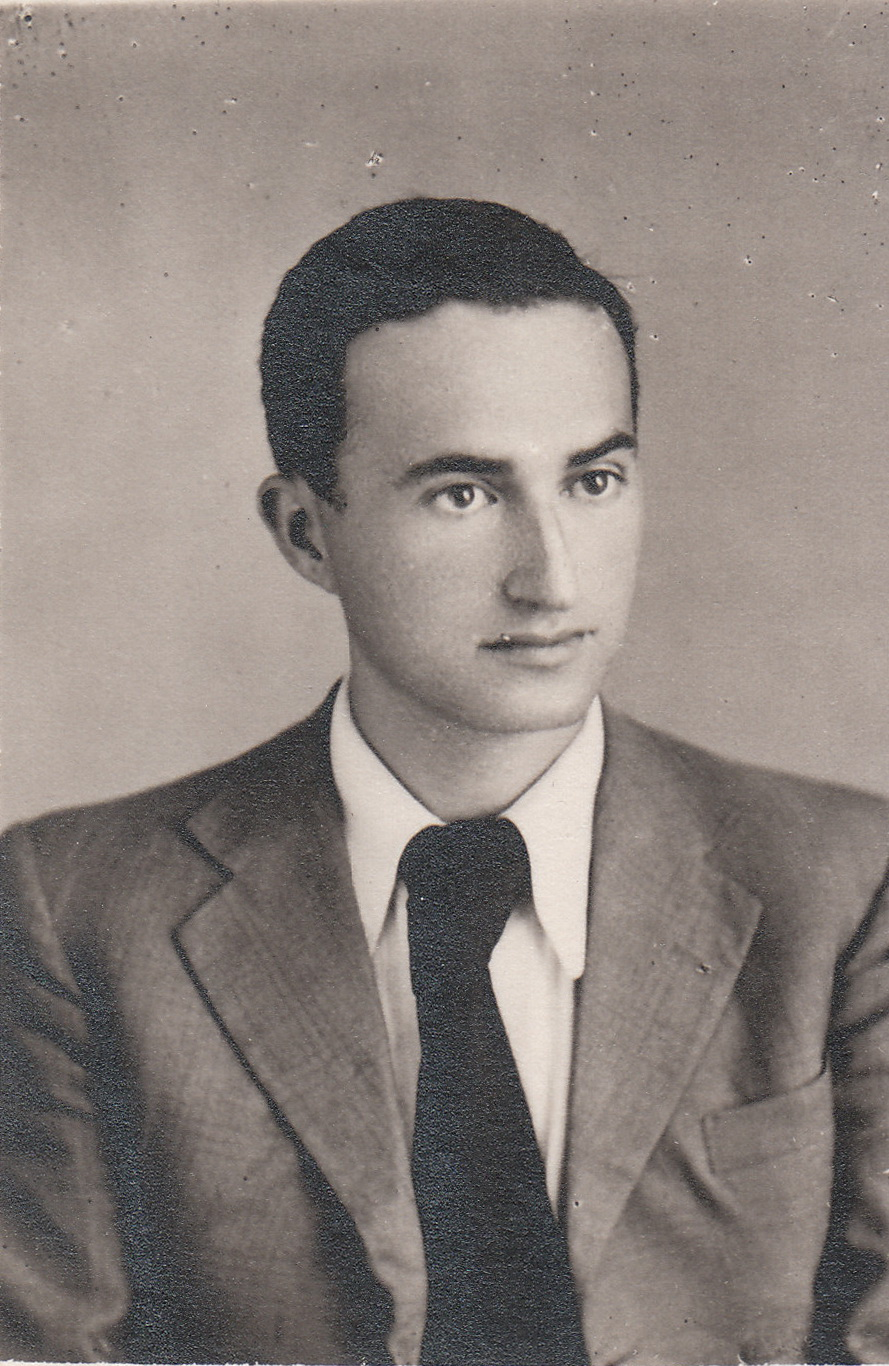
Pavle Stefanović in 1934

Pavle Stefanović (Serbian Cyrillic: Павле Стефановић; 22 March 1901 – 29 October 1985) was a Serbian philosopher, esthetician, essayist, music writer, critic and writer. He was the son of physician writer and poet Svetislav Stefanović who translated Shakespeare, and other English writers.

== Biography ==
Pavle Stefanović was born in Kruševac in 1901 in a family of intellectuals. His father Svetislav Stefanović was a doctor, poet, critic and translator Shakespeare, and his mother Milana Stefanović, née Bota, studied psychology and pedagogy at University of Zurich in Switzerland. His sister, Milica Stefanović was a professor of German, and a friend of the late Mileva Einstein.

Pavle Stefanović is best remembered as a philosopher, esthetician, essayist, music writer, critic, writer. He graduated from Faculty of Philosophy, University of Belgrade in 1926.

Pavle Stefanović worked as a librarian in University Library "Svetozar Markovic" from 1926 to 1948, then as a music commentator at Radio Belgrade from 1948 to 1954. Stefanović was comprehensively engaged in the Association of Yugoslav Librarians, a member of the Belgrade Section and a member of the Board of the Association from 1931 to 1941. In the period before the Second World War, he led the cultural arts society Kud Abrašević for which he wrote songs and prepared performances. He was a colleague of philanthropist Sava Lozanic, Kud choirmaster Dragutin Čolić, Kud conductor Vlastimir Pavlović Carevac and Bora Spužić Kvaka, among others.

Beginning in the early 1930s, he was a music critic for the newspapers "Pravda", "Štampa", "Muzički glasnik", "Vreme" and others. Pavle Stefanović continued to write hundreds of texts, reviews, critiques and essays, published in the journals: "Literature", "Delo", "Izraz" , "Pozorište", "Scene", "Views", "Literary Newspapers", "Contemporary", "Politics", NIN, and for Radio Belgrade programs and others. His cooperation with Third Program of Radio Belgrade stands out.

During the war, between April 1941 and March 1945, did not write whatsoever.

Pavle Stefanović was a man of very wide interests. His thematic scope covered all arts, so in addition to music criticism, he also dealt with the aesthetics of art and essays. He wrote about all artistic fields – music, art, theater, literature, film. Pavle Stefanović published prose, first in periodicals and then in the book of prose – "Gavrilo Kuželj"—published by Nolit. Driven by artistic curiosity, he was also an actor in the film "Spine", directed by Vlatko Gilić. He distinguished himself with exceptional erudition and teaching talent. On the public scene of Serbia and the former Yugoslavia, he gave lectures, performed on radio and television programs, interpreted works of classical and, with special affinity, works and directions of modern art.

In the closest circle of Pavle's friends were Josip Slavenski, Ljubica Marić, Olga Jevrić, Dušan Radić Enriko Josif, Mileta Sajić, Branimir Sakač, Radomir Konstantinović and others.

Stefanović followed the literary, musical, artistic and cultural life of Serbia and the former Yugoslavia, and especially the numerous texts he dedicated to the festivals that were established in all parts of the country during the 1960s of the last century. He regularly followed Belgrade Musical Festival – Bemus, Belgrade International Theatre Festival – Bitef, the Chamber Music Festival in Slatina Radenci, and the Tribune of Yugoslav Music in Opatija.

In Belgrade in 2016, a multidisciplinary scientific conference was held in honor of Stefanović, entitled "Tastes are discussed: Pavle Stefanović (1901‒1985)". The organizers were the Association of Composers of Serbia – Section of Music Writers and the Musicological Society of Serbia.

== Selected bibliography ==
=== Books ===
- Tragom tona (Svjetlost Sarajevo, 1956)
- Gavrilo Kuželj (Nolit, 1974)
- Essays (Nolit, 1982).
- Mind for tone (Nolit, 1986)
- "Putevima simfonije" (The Roads of the Symphony), Center for Public Opinion Research, Program and Auditorium of RTS 2009.

=== Articles ===
- Ljubomir Bošnjaković: History of Music , Novi život (V, 1), 1921–1922, 29.
- Tannhauser by Richard Wagner. Premiere at the National Theater, Press (I, 274), November 18, 1934, 9.
- The first music class of Kolarac People's University , Press (I, 311), December 25, 1934.
- What else can Prokofiev mean to us? , Press (II, 331), January 16, 1935, 10.
- Young Stravinsky for the third time in front of the Belgrade music audience , Štampa (II, 380), March 5, 1935, 8.
- The first performance of choral recitations in our country , Press (II, 385), March 10, 1935, 9.
- Children's Music Afternoon at Kolarac University , Press (II, 389), March 14, 1935, 8.
- Yugoslav Music Festival under the auspices of Cvijeta Zuzorić , Štampa (II, 424), 9 April 20, 1935, 6.
- Ballet guest performance of Mrs. Nina Kirsanova , Press (II, 438), May 8, 1935, 5.
- "Crnjanski's Variations", Our Reality, Journal of Literature, Science, Art and All Social and Cultural Issues (II, 9–10), 1937, 153–154.
- Spiritual Concert of the Jewish Singing Society in Belgrade , Jew (XXII, 52), 1938, 4.
- Premiere of the ballet Devil in the Village , Pravda (XXXIV, 12012), March 27, 1938, p. p. [14].
- Folk Dance (Mrs. Magazinović's Dance Troupe Shows Balkan Folklore) , Pravda (XXXIV, 12026), April 10, 1938, p. p. [7].
- Festival of the Three Philharmonics (Extraordinarily large visit of Belgraders at a concert) , Pravda (XXXIV, 12028), April 12, 1938, p. p. [8].
- "Bach's Passion of John", Pravda (XXXIV, 12037), April 21, 1938, p. p. [15].
- The Art of Choral Recitation at the Wolf's Celebration , Pravda (XXXIV, 12058), May 12, 1938, p. p. [13].
- The Great Art of Nathan Milstein , Justice (XXXIV, 12203), 11. November 2, 1938, p. p. [9].
- Hour of modern music for children in Stanković, Pravda (XXXV, 12314), February 21, 1939, p. p. [18].
- Contemporary Yugoslav Music at the Seventh Kolarac Hour , Pravda (XXXV, 12339), March 18, 1939, II edition, p. p. [5].
- The Magic Flute with Pamina by Miss Mezeta , Pravda (XXXV, 12375), April 23, 1939, II edition, p. p. [3].
- Public class of rhythmic class Mr. Luja Davičo , Pravda (XXXV, 12408), May 26, 1939, II edition, p. p. [4].
- On the occasion of tonight's reprise of Shostakovich's Lady Macbeth , Pravda (XXXV, 12438), June 25, 1939, II edition, p. p. [6].
- The first performance in Belgrade of Škerjanc's cantata Unification , Pravda (XXXV, 12601), December 3, 1939, II edition, p. p. [4].
- "Evening of Modern Yugoslav Music – Three Significant First Performances", Pravda (XXXVI, 12689), February 29, 1940, p. p. [9].
- "Institute for the Study of Russia Celebrates the Centennial of Tchaikovsky's Birth", Pravda (XXXVI, 12764), May 14, 1940, 2nd edition, p. p. [6].
- Cycle of Beethoven's Piano Sonatas (Performed by Paul Baumgartner, March 12–14) , Mladost, Journal of Literature and Culture (VI, 4), April 1950, 377–378.
- "Bach in the musical life of our time", Music (IV, 5), 1951, 36–56.
- "Evening of Young Composers", Književne novine (IV, 11), March 13, 1951, 4.
- Josip Slavenski: Balkanofonija, simfonijska svita , Radio-Belgrade (94), 1–15. January 1951
- Musical Review: On an Antinomy of Performing Perfection. New Italian Quartet , Literature (VII, 7–8), July–August 1952, 155–156.
- Musical Review: Njegos in Our Musical Consciousness , Literature (VII, 1–2), January February 1952, 176–181.
- "Speech at the opening of the exhibition of the Zagreb group" EKSAT 51 "in Belgrade", March 29, 1953, Art and Criticism (1), May 24, 1953.
- Far and Near (Sketch for Music-Sociological Study) , Književne novine (I, 9), 11.
