= DKC-HR =

National network of unions of associations, platforms and associations

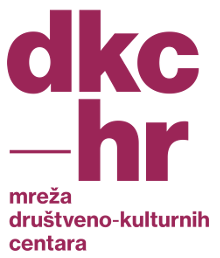
Logo

The Network of Social-Cultural Centers (abbreviated DKC-HR or Network DKC-HR) is a national network of unions of associations, platforms and associations in the Republic of Croatia that advocate the establishment of an institutional framework for social-cultural centers. Social and cultural centers are institutions jointly managed by civil society and the public sector. Such centers provide the local community with a sense of belonging and solidarity and are unconventional places for socializing, relaxing, talking, meeting, producing, presenting, educating, consulting and informing.

== History ==
The Network of Socio-Cultural Centers was founded on May 28, 2020, in Zagreb. The network is founded on the initiative of a total of nine members (union of associations, platforms and associations) who co-manage existing socio-cultural centers in the Republic of Croatia according to the principle of participatory management and develop models of civil-public partnerships in culture. The members of the DKC Network decided to establish a formal national network after many years of efforts regarding the development of social and cultural centers in a dozen cities in Croatia.

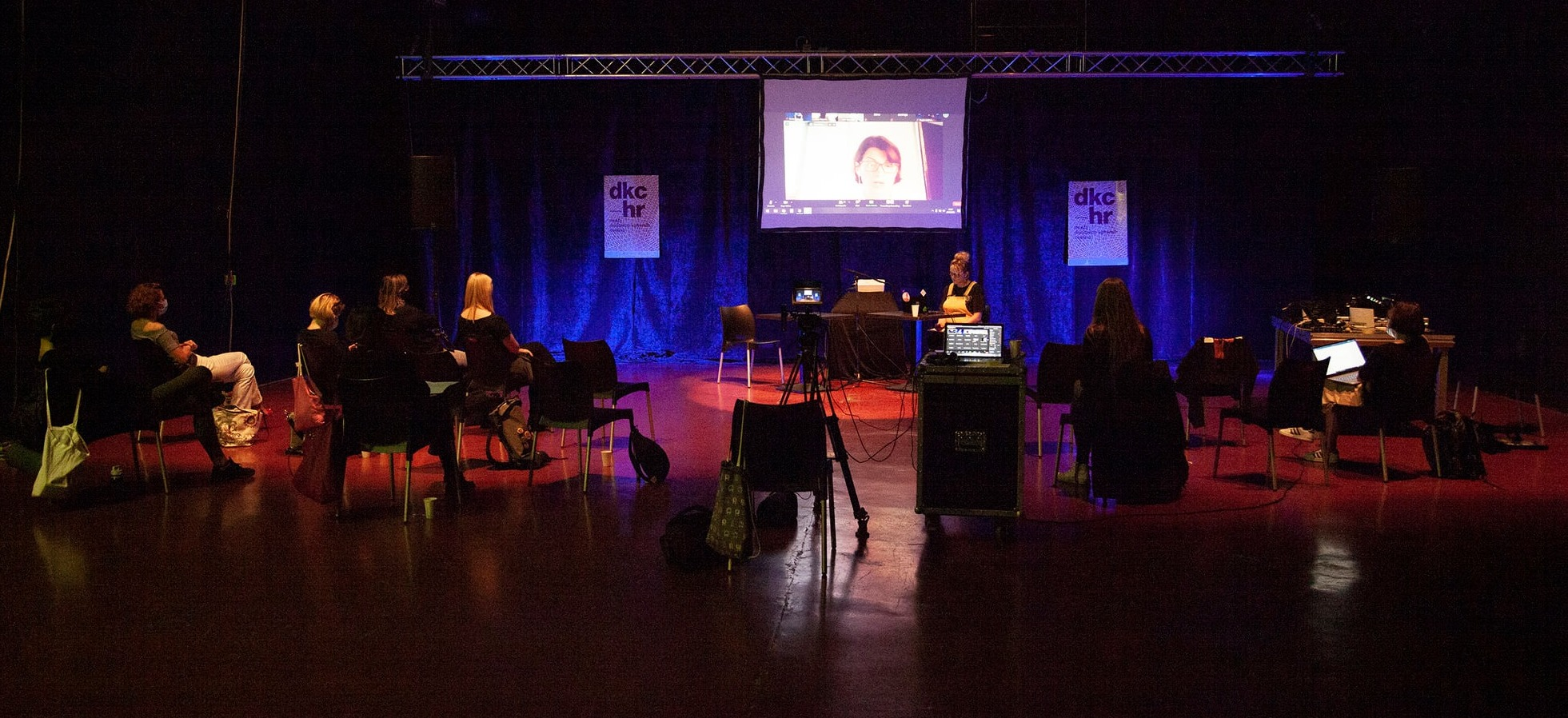
Panel discussion at the conference "DKC-HR: Network of social and cultural centers", September 23, 2020

The establishment of the DKC Network arose from the need to strengthen the role of social and cultural centers in the Republic of Croatia. One of the models for socio-cultural centers in Croatia is POGON – Zagreb Center for Independent Culture and Youth, which was founded in 2008, and the model of that public non-profit institution set an appropriate framework for the establishment of social- cultural centers and in other cities.

In 2020, the Clubture network organized a final conference of the project "DKC-HR: Network of Social and Cultural Centers" which was carried out as part of the call "Culture in the center – support for the development of public civil partnership in culture". In addition to the presentation of the results, it included panels on the practices of participatory management and civil-public partnership in socio-cultural centers in Croatia and the region.

== Organizational structure ==
The founders of the DKC Network are: Art Workshop Lazareti from Dubrovnik, Forum of independent culture associations – FUNK from Koprivnica, Platform Dom mladih from Split, Platforma Hvar from Hvar, KAoperativa Union of Associations from Karlovac, Clubture as national network of associations from Zagreb.

The DKC network has an Assembly and a board of directors. The assembly is the highest governing body of the association. The management board has 5 members. The association is headed by the president. The headquarters of the association is in Zagreb, at the address Baruna Trenka 11. The President of the DKC Network is Mirela Travar from the Association of Associations Operation City.
