= Tolj =

Tolj is a Croatian surname of a family originating from a small town called Stilja village near Vrgorac, Croatia.

The family name may refer to:

- Marija Tolj (1999), Croatian athlete
- Miroslav Tolj, Croatian actor known for his role in Borat Subsequent Moviefilm
- Maya Tolj, American Scholar (1977)
- Ivan Tolj (born 1982), Croatian scientist and professor
- Samantha Tolj (born 1982), Australian actress
- Slaven Tolj (born 1964), Croatian multimedia artist
