= Club Guy & Roni =

Dutch dance company

Club Guy & Roni is an international dance company from Groningen in the Netherlands, led by choreographers Roni Haver and Guy Weizman. The company was founded in 2002.

The performances are characterized by collaborations with artists in music, film and theatre and are generally considered to be of modern nature. Club Guy & Roni makes productions that tour through Europe. Since 2009 the company is subsidized by the NFPK.

In 2018 Club Guy & Roni started the interdisciplinary movement called NITE together with Noord Nederlands Toneel + Het Muziek + Den Haag.

== Performances ==
Club Guy & Roni have performed at various festivals, like Oerol, Noorderzon and De Parade, the American Jacob's Pillow Festival and the Grec Festival in Barcelona, Spain.

== International co-productions ==
The Club has performed in many European countries. Since 2010, Haver and Weizman are considered 'artists in residence' at the Oldenburgisches State Theater en since then they have co-produced 'Alpha Boys (2010), 'Miraculous Wednesday' (2011) and Roméo and Juliette' (2013). In September 2014 they moved along with the artistic staff of Oldenburg to take up residency at the State Theatre in Mainz.

In addition, the choreographers have also been working together with the Moscow dance company Tsekh Contemporary Dance Centre since 2011 and have produced a Russian 'L'Histoire du Soldat’. In Tuscany and Belgrado, Club Guy & Roni has also done co-productions, as well as with the Gothenburg Ballet (Sweden), Schauspiel Kölln (Germany) and Carte Blanche (Norway).

== Awards ==
- Russian Golden Mask National Theatre Award in the category Best Ballet Master/Best Choreographer for the in Russia produced version of ‘L’Histoire du Soldat’ (2013)
- The Swan for best dance production for 'Midnight Rising'. (2013)
- Igor Podsiadly: The Swan for best Dance Performance for 'Naked Lunch' (2014)
- In January 2026, the Jiří Kylián Ring was awarded to the duo Haver Weizman.

== Nominations ==
- Roni Haver: Silver Theater dance award for ‘Albert and Panja’ (2001)
- Roni Haver: The Swan for best Dance Performance for ‘Myrrh and Cinnamon’ (2005)
- VSCD Theatre Award for ‘Heelhuids en Halsoverkop’ (2009)
- The Swan in the category Best Dance Production for ‘Alpha Boys’ (2011)
- Russian Golden Mask National Theatre Award in the category Innovation/Best Production for the in Russia produced version of ‘L’Histoire du Soldat’ (2013)
- Dunja Jocic: The Swan for best Dance Performance for 'Midnight Rising' (2013)

== Works ==
- The Mother of All Lies - Stichting Grand Theatre - 2003
- The Language of Walls (on The Other Side of Day) - Stichting Grand Theatre - 2003
- Barbie Q - Stichting Grand Theatre - 2004
- Myrrh and Cinnamon - Stichting Grand Theatre - 2004
- Welcome to Soledad - Noord Nederlands Toneel - 2006
- All Is Well - Stichting Grand Theatre - 2006
- Poetic Disasters - Stichting Grand Theatre - 2008
- Desert Highway - Stichting Grand Theatre - 2009
- Heelhuids en Halsoverkop - Noord Nederlands Toneel - 2009
- Pinball And Grace - Stichting Grand Theatre - 2009
- The Language of Walls - a.k.a. Alpha Boys - Stichting Grand Theatre - 2009
- FKK - Stichting Grand Theatre - 2010
- Alice in Wonderland - Noord Nederlands Toneel - 2010
- L'histoire du soldat - Stichting Grand Theatre - 2011
- Miraculous Wednesday - Stichting Grand Theatre - 2011
- Messiaen 1.0 - Club Guy & Roni - 2012
- Midnight Rising - Club Guy & Roni - 2012
- L'Histoire du Soldat - Club Guy & Roni - 2013
- CRASH - Noord Nederlands Toneel - 2013
- Bagatellen - Club Guy & Roni - 2013
- Firebird - Club Guy & Roni - 2013
- L'histoire du soldat (Russische versie) - Club Guy & Roni - 2013
- Naked Lunch - Club Guy & Roni - 2013
- Niemandsland - De Steeg - 2014
- Gift for Ifinity - Club Guy & Roni - 2014
- Offending the Audience - Club Guy & Roni - 2014
- My Private Odyssey - Club Guy & Roni - 2014
- Mechanical Ecstasy - Club Guy & Roni - 2015
- Phobia - Club Guy & Roni - 2015
- Sneeuwwitje - Noord Nederlands Toneel - 2015
- Kaspar - Club Guy & Roni - 2016
- Happiness - Club Guy & Roni - 2016
- Music for Bars - Club Guy & Roni - 2016
- Carrousel - Noord Nederlands Toneel - 2017
- Penthesilea - Noord Nederlands Toneel - 2017
- Self-accusation - Club Guy & Roni - 2017
- Tetris mon amour - Club Guy & Roni - 2017
- Salam - Noord Nederlands Toneel - 2018
- Faust TM - Noord Nederlands Toneel - 2018
- One Million People and Me - Noord Nederlands Toneel - 2018
- Fassbinder towards- In einem Jahr mit 13 Monden - Poetic Disasters Club - 2018
- Mechanical Ecstasy - Club Guy & Roni - 2018
- Brave New World 2.0 - NITE - 2019
- Carry / Jump / Catch - Club Guy & Roni - 2019
- Love - Club Guy & Roni - 2019
- Mechanical Ecstasy - Club Guy & Roni - 2020
- Swan Lake - Club Guy & Roni - 2020
- All That Follows – NITE - 2021
- Celestial Space – NITE - 2021
- Motel - NITE - 2021
- Odyssey – NITE - 2021
- Rail Rat – NITE - 2021
- Freedom - Club Guy & Roni - 2021
- Lubeck - Club Guy & Roni - 2021
- The Previous Owner - Club Guy & Roni - 2021
- Zinderella - Maas theater en dans - 2022
- Witch Hunt - Noord Nederlands Toneel - 2022
- Vijand - Noord Nederlands Toneel - 2022
- The Underground – NITE - 2022
- Fortune - Club Guy & Roni - 2022
- Postcards from Another Place - Club Guy & Roni - 2022
- Laba - Club Guy & Roni - 2022
- Als het anders loopt - Het Houten Huis - 2022
- My First Tragedy- Iphigeneia - Noord Nederlands Toneel - 2023
- Yara's Wedding – NITE - 2023
- Like A Prayer - Club Guy & Roni - 2023
- Islands of Empathy (in A Sea of Chaos) - Club Guy & Roni - 2023
- Adi(c)sco - Club Guy & Roni - 2024
- Faith - Club Guy & Roni - 2024
- Morning Ecstasy - Club Guy & Roni - 2024
- Nachtwacht – NITE - 2025
- A Funny Little Show about Endings - Club Guy & Roni - 2025
- Bad Nature - Club Guy & Roni - 2025
- Hope – NITE - 2025

== Additional projects ==
In 2011 Club Guy & Roni initiated the 'Duizend Dansjes Festival', to raise money for the UMCG Cancer Research Fund in Groningen. Eventually, €15,140 were raised for the Fund.

Move it! is a participation project from 2011 in which Club Guy & Roni and the Noord Nederlands Orkest teach a group of youths a choreography based on orchestral work.

Every year Club Guy & Roni organizes the Club Guy & Roni Weekend Break Festival, a festival full of dance, theatre, live music, film and art. Club Guy & Roni seek contact with young, local talents for the production of this festival. The first edition was in 2013 in the Grand Theatre in Groningen.

=== The Poetic Disasters Club ===
The Poetic Disasters Club is the junior company of Club Guy & Roni (and later NITE), founded in 2013 as a talent development platform for young dancers, actors, and musicians who are about to graduate or have just graduated from their training programs. The initiative was established by choreographers Guy Weizman and Roni Haver as part of their Groningen-based dance company Club Guy & Roni.

In 2016, the Poetic Disasters Club performed Kaspar at De Parade festival, a loose adaptation of Peter Handke's experimental play directed by Hendrik Aerts and choreographed by Angela Herenda, which explored themes of communication and identity through dance-theater.
