= Svetislav Stefanović =

Serbian physician and writer (1877–1944)

- Светислав Стефановић
- Born: 1 November 1877; Novi Sad, Austria-Hungary (now Serbia)
- Died: 18 November 1944 (aged 67); Belgrade, Yugoslavia (now Serbia)
- Cause of death: Execution by firing squad
- Spouse: Milana Bota
- Children: Pavle Stefanović
- Relatives: Ivana Stefanović (granddaughter)

Svetislav Stefanović (Serbian: Светислав Стефановић; 1 November 1877 – 18 November 1944) was a Serbian physician, literary critic, and writer. Stefanović is best remembered in "the treatment of tuberculosis and comparative literature, with his dissertation on William Shakespeare's Hamlet".

== Biography ==
Svetislav Stefanović was born to a prominent Serb family on 1 November 1877 in Novi Sad, at the time part of Austria-Hungary. He completed his elementary schooling in Futog and Gymnasium in Novi Sad, where he also studied philosophy for two semesters, 1897 and 1898. Stefanović then went to Vienna and Prague, where he graduated in 1902 as a medical doctor. In Serbia, he practiced medicine in Jagodina, Obrenovac, and Belgrade before volunteering in the medical corps and participating in the Balkan Wars and the Great War. After the Great Retreat, he worked with Ludwik Hirszfeld in Salonika. After the war Stefanović played an important role in reconstructing the health care system in Serbia.

He was a physician by profession and the founder of the Department of Pathology. He was a writer and a poet, a critic, translator, essayist, and a playwright. A modernist and avant-gardist, Stefanović's essays and critiques, defended Petković-Dis's poetry, and in the interwar period, he defended modernist poetry. He was a friend of most of the contemporary poets of his time, Laza Kostić, Petković-Dis, Todor Manojlović, Jovan Dučić, Miloš Crnjanski, Milan Rakić, Stanislav Vinaver.

Stefanović was on the list of death row inmates under number 66 in the "Statement of the Military Court of the First Corps of the NOVJ on convicted war criminals in Belgrade", published on the first and second pages of "Politika" on 27 November 1944. The ordinal number of the name in the announcement reads the ideologue of fascism, the translator of Mussolini's "State", the German-Nedić commissioner of the Serbian Literary Cooperative, Jonić's advisor on the issues of prosecuting the writers' cooperative. A member of the German Commission for slandering the Soviet authorities in connection with the German crimes in Vinnytsia".

Svetislav Stefanović was shot in Belgrade before a firing squad on charges of being an enemy of the people and a war criminal on 18 November 1944 by the Yugoslav Partisans who usurped the reins of the royal Yugoslav government then in exile in London. The procedure for political rehabilitation was initiated in 2008 based on a request sent by Tamara Grujić to the District Court in Belgrade. Stefanovć's writings is now beginning to be recognized for its sociological and philosophical value.

Svetislav Stefanović was married to Milana Bota. His son was writer Pavle Stefanović (1902–1985).

== Poetry ==
- The Song of the Dead
- The Great Joy
- The Impotence of Death
- Destruction
- The Triumph of Venus
- Darkness
- The Dream of Duke Mandušić
- Spring
- Studije o narodnoj poeziji (Studies in National Poetry)

Literary critics "from Skerlić's circle" denied him poetic talent. Gojko Tešić writes that his "critical engagement in defending the concept of modern Serbian poetry" is much more important than Stefanović's poetry. He defended Vladislav Petković Dis poetry in the program article "Honor and Freedom to Creators!" essays in "Bosanska vila" (1912–1913), "Više slobode stiha", "Stih ili pesma?" are significant, and in the interwar period he defended modernist poetry, especially in the essay "Alarm of Criticism and the Youngest Modern" ("Thought", 1921) and in a controversy with Marko Car ("Thought and Politics").

Stefanović was known as a critic of his contemporaries. He thought that too much energy was spent on the war with the old art, instead of releasing the new one. He criticized the artificial construction and lack of intuition and spontaneity in avant-garde poetry. He believed in rebellion, a renewal mission, but also in the return of barbarism and primitivism to literature, believing that they represented a refreshment for the arts. However, in the 1930s, Svetislav Stefanović abandoned the conception he advocated, renounced modernism, became conservative, and switched to the literary right.

== Translations ==
Stefanović also translated literary works from German, Italian, French, Hungarian, Hebrew and English. He translated several Walt Whitman poems. and Edgar Allan Poe Also, Stefanović translated William Shakespeare's Othello, Hamlet, and Twelfth Night works by Dante Gabriel Rossetti, W. B. Yeats, Oscar Wilde, and others.

== Literature ==
- Gojko Tešić: "Anthology of Serbian Avant-garde Poetry 1902–1934", Svetovi, Novi Sad, 1994.
- Gojko Tešić: "Serbian avant-garde in a polemical context", Novi Sad, Svetovi, 1991.
- Stanislav Vinaver: Sun and shadows. Songs of Mr. Svetislava Stefanovića , Štampa, XI / 180, 2. VII 1912.
- Milivoj Nenin: "Svetislav Stefanović – forerunner
