= Shadow Casters =

Intermedia arts collective from Zagreb

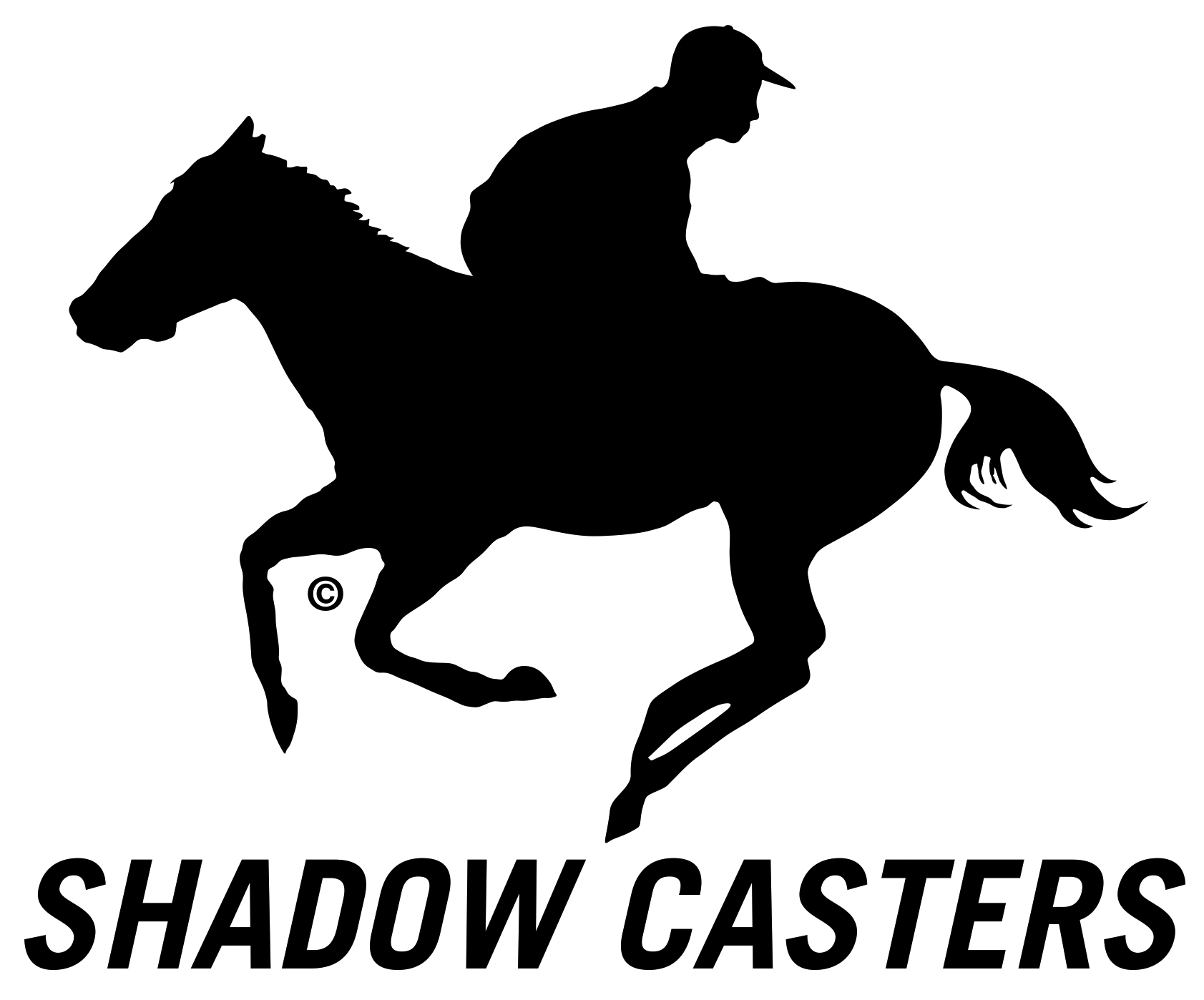
Shadow Casters's logo (EN)

Shadow Casters (Croatian: Bacači sjenki) is a non-profit organization from Zagreb (Croatia) working as an international artistic and production platform for interdisciplinary cooperations in intermedia arts in urban context. It was founded in 2002 by artists Boris Bakal and Željko Serdarević, with Katarina Pejović, Stanko Juzbašić, Vanja Žanko, Srećko Horvat, Sandra Uskoković, Leo Vukelić and other collaborators. Since 2006 they are a Clubture Network member.

Shadow Casters initially started as a project of Orchestra Stolpnik in Bologna in 2001. As an organization it is focused on intercultural dialogue, creating projects and platforms for cultural exchanges between Croatian and international artists and art professionals, and questions concepts of individual and collective identity. Its projects encourage discussion about the nature and contradictions of the ongoing globalization processes and deals with social, political and cultural topics that point to important problems in society.

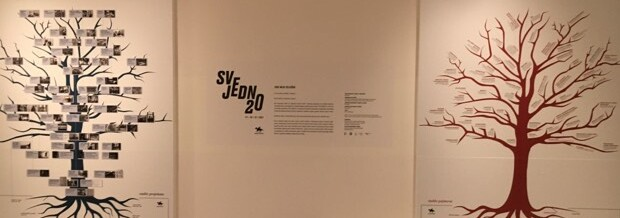
Shadow Casters: All in all 20 (anniversary expo installation)

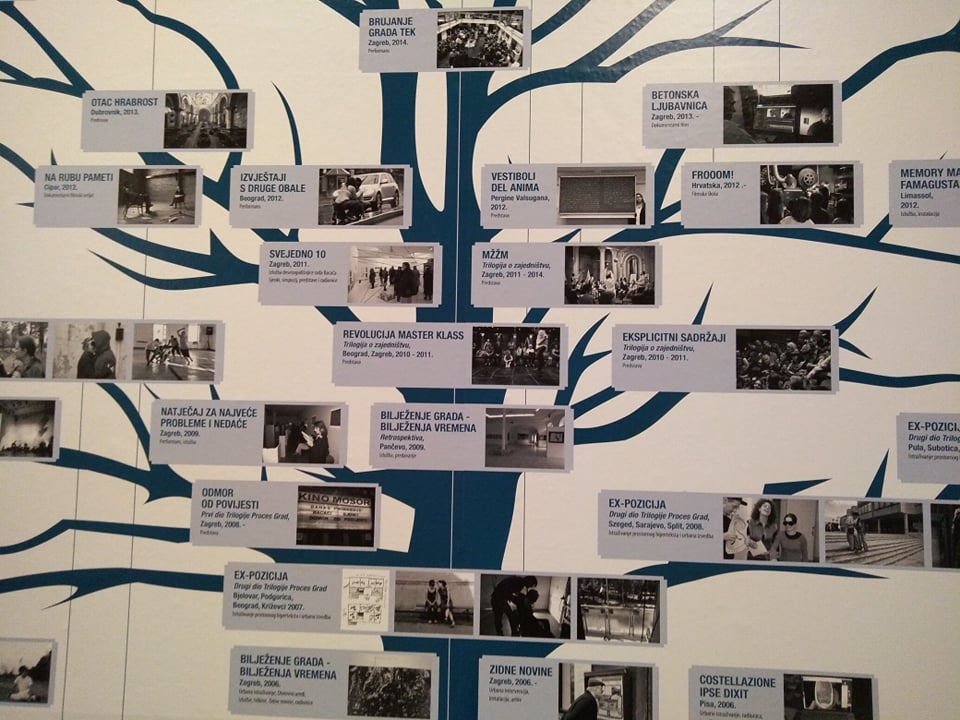
Shadow Casters: All in all 20 (installation detail, projects tree)

== Key works, topics and poetics ==
Shadow Casters realized a number of domestic and international projects creating performative, educational, multimedia or socially engaged (most often) time-based works and questioning relations between man and space: as a study of cities, as poetic-detective urban journeys Shadow Casters; as an interweaving of the material space of the performance and the real time of the actor with the virtual space and the delayed time of the film theater in the trilogy based on Kafka named Process_City (Process_in_Progress, Ex-position, Vacation From History); as an entry into the microcosm of a skyscraper and a multidimensional discovery of its past, present and future Čovjek je Prostor: Vitić_pleše, a multimedia archive of urban events that become the tool for studying the hypertextuality of space Re-collecting City/Re-collecting Time; theater trilogy On togetherness (Explicit Contents, ®evolution: Master Class, Male/Female-Female/Male), multimedia installation History of Vacation, etc.

Retrospective exhibition All in All 20 (Croatian: Sve-jedno 20) in Zagreb, presented key projects and concepts from past 20 years of work in playful and interactive way.

== Productions ==
In first 20 years over 150 artists from more than 50 countries participated in projects realized and presented at festivals and events in Zagreb, Dubrovnik, Bologna, Graz, Ljubljana, Pisa, Belgrade, Marseille, Leiden, Genoa, Podgorica and New York, in cooperation with partners (Urban Festival, Days of Croatian Film, Eurokaz Festival, MI2 Institute, Art workshop Lazareti and Karantena Festival, Croatia; Exodus Festival and Modern Gallery, Slovenia; CinemaTeatro LUX, Fabbrica Europa, Stagione di Caccia festival and Orchestra Stolpnik, Italy; CENPI and Centar Rex, SCG; Stadt Park Galerie, Graz, Austria; LFK&La FRICHE, France; Leiden University, The Netherlands; Media Center The Kitchen, Dancing in The Streets, Columbia University, USA).

Shadow Casters were supported by the Zagreb Office for Culture, Education and Sports of the City of Zagreb, the Ministry of Culture of the Republic of Croatia, the Ministry of Science, Education and Sports of the Republic of Croatia, sponsors (like Zagrebačka banka, Erste Bank, Ergonet, etc.) and foundations (Zaklada Kultura nova, National Foundation for the Development of Civil Society, Trust for Mutual Understanding, ArtsLink, European Cultural Foundation ECF) state agencies and offices (Office of the Government of the Republic of Croatia and Gender Equality, and Agency for Electronic Media) and many others.
