= Art Workshop Lazareti =

Cultural centre in Zagreb, Croatia

The Art Workshop Lazareti (Croatian: Art radionica Lazareti; ARL) in Dubrovnik, Croatia, is an independent cultural center for contemporary art and performing arts venue that hosts artists, theorists, writers, activists and promotes an active and investigative approach to contemporary art and culture, society, politics and its inter-relations. Its club also hosted a wide range of programs from mainstream to alternative music programs.

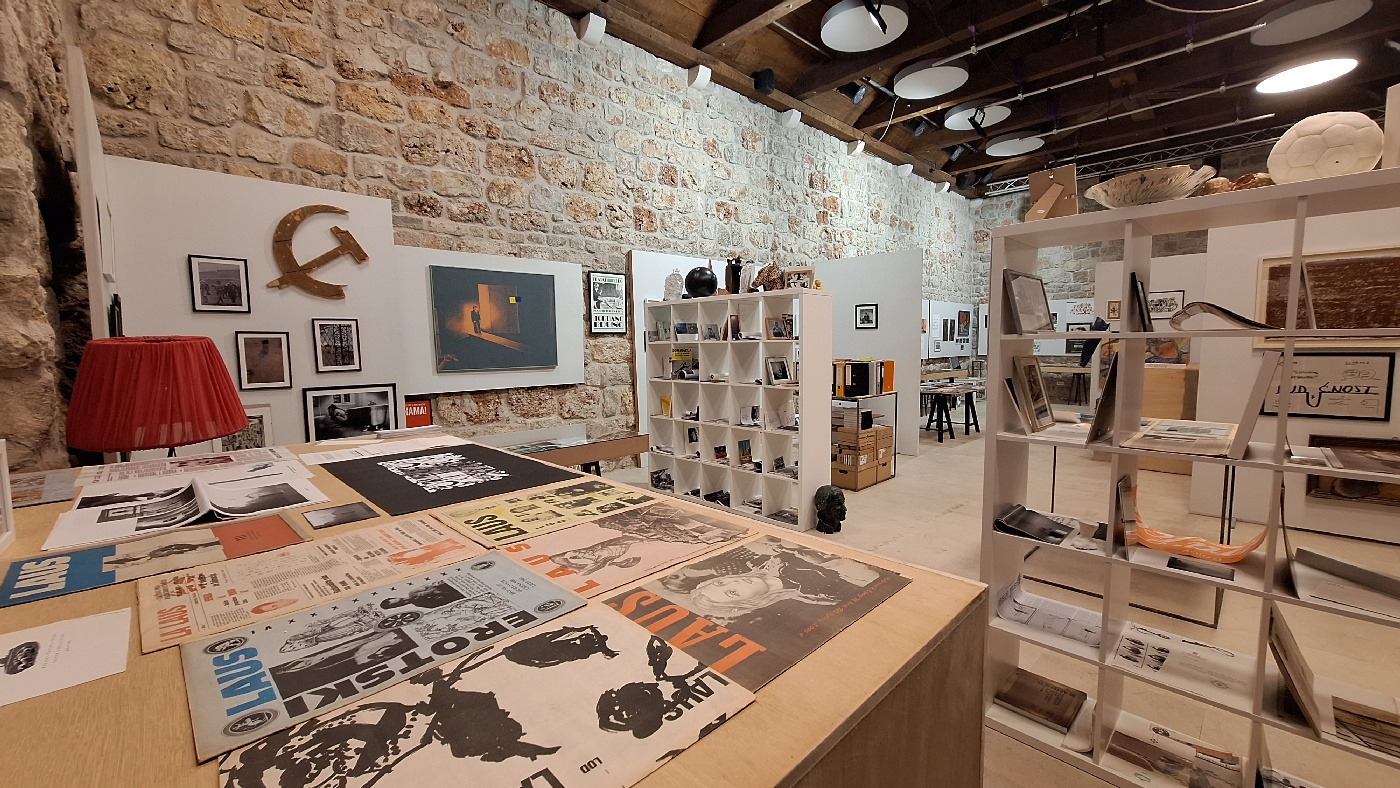
Exhibition opening 35 years of Lazareti Art Workshop

The Art Workshop Lazareti was established in 1988 and it is located in the old Dubrovnik harbour quarantine called Lazareti, built in 1642, immediately overlooking the Dubrovnik city beach and old harbour. The workshop has revitalized the historic building, which in 2002 had been included in the 2002 World Monuments Watch by the World Monuments Fund, and was subsequently restored.

Art Workshop Lazareti was founded and managed by Slaven Tolj, prominent artist and later director of Museum of Modern and Contemporary Art in Rijeka. ARL is a founding member of DKC-HR and Clubture networks since 2002, with Srđana Cvijetić from ARL serving as the president of the network since 2022.

A film was made in 2004 based on an international art project called "the Island", organised by ARL and the Institute for Contemporary Art in Zagreb, to illustrate the work of the ARL.
