= Clubture =

Croatian network of cultural organizations

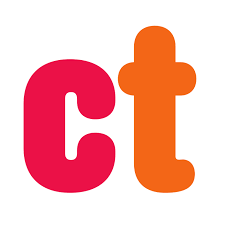
Logo of Clubture Network

Clubture (or Clubture Network, officially in English: Union of non-profit organizations Clubture; in Croatian: Savez udruga Klubtura or short Klubtura) is a non-profit, inclusive, participatory network that works on gathering actors and strengthening collaboration between non-profit organizations in Croatia, founded in May 2002 in Zagreb. The network works towards achieving its goals through the exchange of cultural and artistic activities and programs across different parts of the country. It was formally registered on June 16, 2002.

The network gathers over 50 active members, including Art Workshop Lazareti, Shadow Casters, Kontejner, Multimedia Institute, QueerANarchive, Queer Sport Split, Skribonauti, Udruga za promicanje kultura Kulturtreger, Udruženje za razvoj kulture "URK", etc. Clubture Network participates in national, regional, and international projects, initiatives, and networks. It started running regional programs in 2004 with the aim of connecting independent cultural organizations in countries of the former SFR Yugoslavia.

== History ==
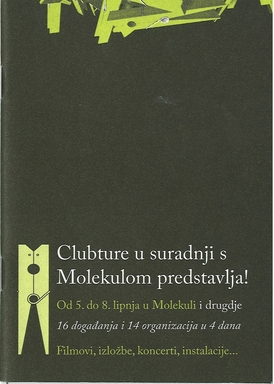
1st Clubture Forum poster, Rijeka, 2008

The network was founded in 2002 in Zagreb, initiated by Multimedia Institute and Zagreb clubs such as Močvara, Attack, and KSET. The name Clubture arises from the initial idea of club program exchange, but since the beginning, other organizations focusing on culture and youth have joined.

Founding organizations included: Art Workshop Lazareti from Dubrovnik, GRADDONJI from Osijek, Metamedia and Monteparadiso from Pula, Pokret urbanog življenja from Slavonski Brod, cultural-artistic association Romb from Split, Spirit from Rijeka, WHW - What, How & for Whom, URK - Udruženje za razvoj kulture and Udruženje Zdravo društvo, Autonomous cultural center ATTACK!, BLOK - Lokalna baza za osvježavanje kulture, Udruga studenata arhitekture EASA-Hrvatska, Ekseperimentalna slobodna scena - EKS Scena and Multimedia Institute from Zagreb.

Since 2007 Clubture Network is a member of Culture Action Europe. Clubture network is also a founding member of DKC-HR network of socio-cultural centers organized as public-civil partnerships across Croatia.

== Programs and projects ==
Since 2002, Clubture Network has continually implemented the program Clubture-HR: Program exchange and collaboration which through independent cultural organizations, artist organizations and informal initiatives implements partner projects realizing different contemporary cultural events throughout Croatia. Until 2022, the program enabled more than 260 projects with over 1500 cultural and artistic events in more than 100 cities and towns in Croatia. One of the program's specificities is collective decision-making on which programs will be realized in a program cycle, decided by all the project proponents and members of the Clubture Network. Some projects initiated by the Clubture Network have grown into independent organization programs. The portal kulturpunkt.hr, focusing on contemporary independent culture, that Clubture initiated in 2005, today is a major project of the organization Kurziv - Platform for Matters of Culture, Media and Society.

=== Annual Programs ===
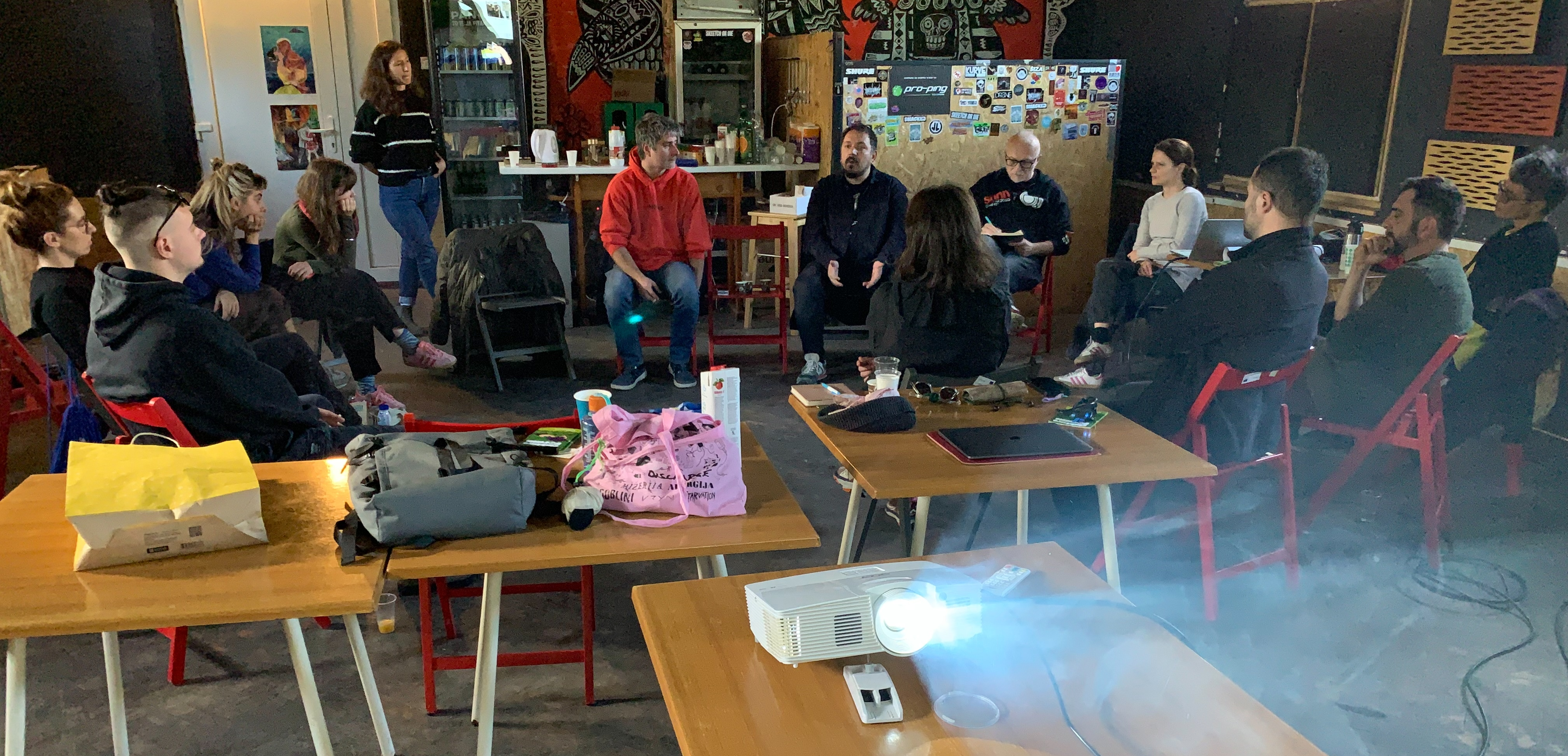
Clubture Forum 2025 in Koprivnica

The program Clubture Forum was founded in 2008 and is an annual gathering of Clubture Network member organizations and other interested organizations working in the field of independent culture. The Forum is a multi-day event consisting of numerous workshops, public forum, open conversations, etc. focusing on topics such as: working conditions of independent cultural organizations, problems of space resources, independent culture inside cultural policy, etc. The artistic part of the Forum program aims to present recent artistic productions of the city hosting the Forum. The first Clubture Forum was held in Rijeka in the period 5–8 June 2008, and the 14th Clubture Forum in Osijek in the period 24–26 September 2021.

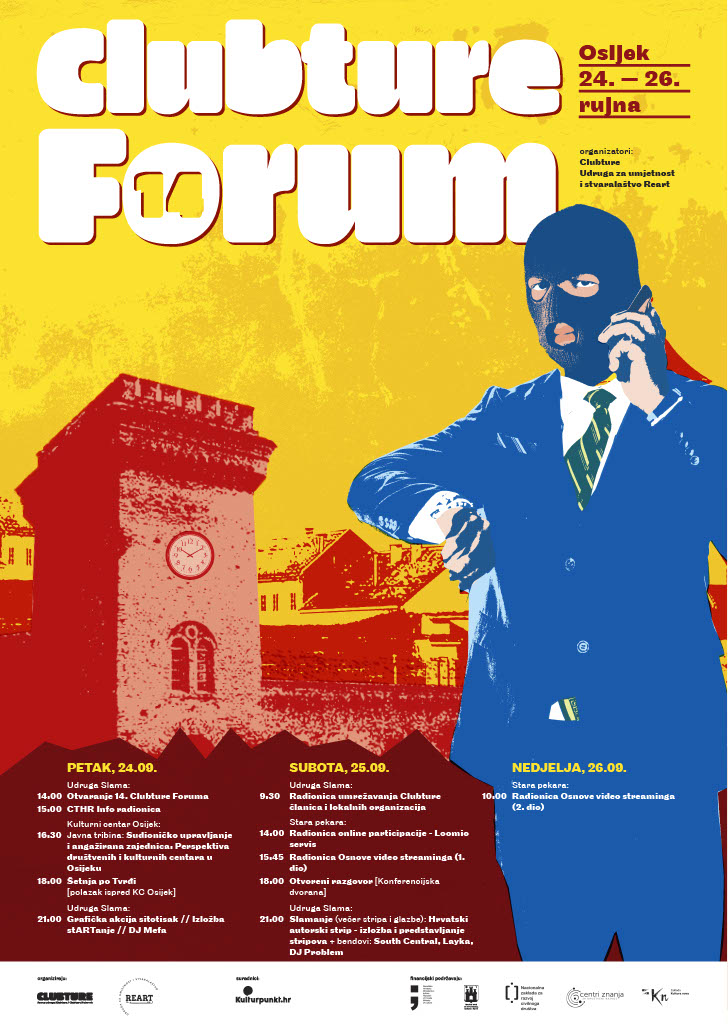
14th Clubture Forum poster, Osijek, 2021

=== Regional Programs ===
The program "Regional Initiative of the Clubture Network" aims to geographically expand program exchange and collaboration to the organizations in the region started in 2004, and since 2012 has been part of the independent organization Kooperativa platform. Regional programs include more than a hundred civil society organizations from Bosnia and Herzegovina, Croatia, North Macedonia, Slovenia, and Serbia.

== Publications ==
Clubture Network sometimes publishes different publications - research reports, books, anthologies and magazines - in which it reports about the independent cultural sector, follows independent cultural production, reflects on its work, etc. Publications (all accessible on the web):

- Mreža Clubture - 20 godina razmjene i suradnje, Publisher: Savez udruga Klubtura, 2021. g., ISBN 978-953-95994-5-2, Available on web
- Uvođenje reda u udruge - Poticajno okruženje ili nadzor civilnog društva, Publisher: Savez udruga Klubtura, 2016. g., ISBN 978-953-95994-4-5, Available on web
- Mreža Clubture - Mapiranje organizacija nezavisne kulture, Publisher: Savez udruga Klubtura, 2014. g., ISBN 978-953-95994-3-8, Available on web
- Exit Europe - Nove geografije kulture, Publisher: Savez udruga Klubtura, 2011. g., ISBN 978-953-95994-2-1 / ISBN 978-86-84977-07-8, Available on web
- Dizajn i nezavisna kultura, Publishers: Savez udruga Klubtura /Clubture, UPI-2M PLUS d.o.o., KURZIV — Platforma za pitanja kulture, medija i društva, ISBN 978-953-95994-1-4, 978-953-7703-07-3, Zagreb, September 2010.
- Kulturne politike odozdo - Nezavisna kultura i nove suradničke prakse u Hrvatskoj, Publisher: Savez udruga Klubtura, 2008. g., Available on web
- Clubture - Kultura kao proces razmjene 2002. - 2007., Publisher: Savez udruga Klubtura, 2007. g., ISBN 978-953-95994-0-7, Available on web
- Istraživanje nezavisnog kulturnog sektora: mreža Klubtura / Clubture Istraživački izvještaj, Publisher: Savez udruga Klubtura, 2006. g., Available on web

From April 2004 to November 2007 Clubture published 04, megazin za hakiranje stvarnosti - printed media reporting on contemporary independent cultural production in Croatia, following wider social and civil questions aiming to offset mainstream media. All issues of 04 are available on web.
