= Slaven Tolj =

Croatian artist

- Born: 14 April 1964 (age 61); Dubrovnik, SR Croatia, Yugoslavia

Slaven Tolj (born 14 April 1964) is a Croatian conceptual, performance, and media artist, curator, and cultural worker from Dubrovnik, Croatia. He achieved international recognition for his installations, body art, and performances presenting distinct political and social-cultural criticism.

The beginning of Slaven Tolj’s work, as an artist, was determined by his experiences of the Yugoslav War, the Siege of Dubrovnik by the Yugoslavian army in the years 1991-1992, as well as the disintegration of former Yugoslavia. In the course of the late 1990s Slaven Tolj gradually extended the scope of his art, incorporating themes and issues related to political transformation and the emergence of multiculturalism and globalization.

Slaven Tolj has also been involved in organisational and curatorial activities. He is one of the founders of Art Workshop Lazareti in Dubrovnik – a key institution for the contemporary art scene in Dubrovnik and Croatia. He was a director of the Museum of Modern and Contemporary Art in Rijeka from 2012 until 2020, as well as the artistic director of Rijeka 2020 European Capitol of Culture.

In 2005 he was the commissioner of the Croatian pavilion at the Venice Biennale.

== Sources ==
- About Slaven Tolj by Michael Kolecek
- the-artists.org Slaven Tolj
- Art Workshop Lazareti
