= Sava Lozanić =

Serbian industrialist

Sava Lozanić (Serbian Cyrillic: Сава Лозанић; 1882 – 1952) was a Serbian industrialist and philanthropist.

His foundry "Merkur" in Belgrade made many church bells in the Kingdom of Yugoslavia, including the one in the old church in Jasenovac (demolished by the Ustashas in 1941), Dečani, Mileševo, etc.

== Biography ==
Lozanić was born in the settlement of Melenci in Banat, as the only child of father Drago and mother Marija. He was left an orphan as a child. He ended up in Belgrade in his youth, where he worked as a foreman in factories.

In 1906, he married Jelena Rajković, a girl from a well-to-do family, with whom he would have four daughters: Cveta, Radmila (later the wife of the painter Kosta Hakman), Ružica, and Milica. During the First World War, the whole family participated in the defense of the country.

Lozanić was nicknamed Majka Srbija ("Mother Serbia") because, in addition to helping his workers, he materially helped poor and sick citizens. He acted as a patron of the Home for the Blind in Zemun, choir singers of KUD "Abrasević", football players of BSK, artists, guild colleagues-craftsmen, and others.

The "Mercury" foundry was destroyed on April 6, 1941, in the German bombing of Belgrade. After the Second World War, Lozanic's property was nationalized by the new government. Attempts were also made to accuse Lozanić of war profiteering under occupation, but the workers of "Merkur" defended their former boss from this accusation, so Lozanić was spared the punishment of shooting or imprisonment. He died in Celje.

In 2017, the Radio Television of Serbia made the documentary Zvona Sava Lozanića (2017), directed by Dragan M. Ćirjanić, which premiered on Christmas, January 7, 2018.
