= National Theatre in Subotica =

Theater in Subotica, Serbia

Coordinates: 46°06′00″N 19°39′59″E

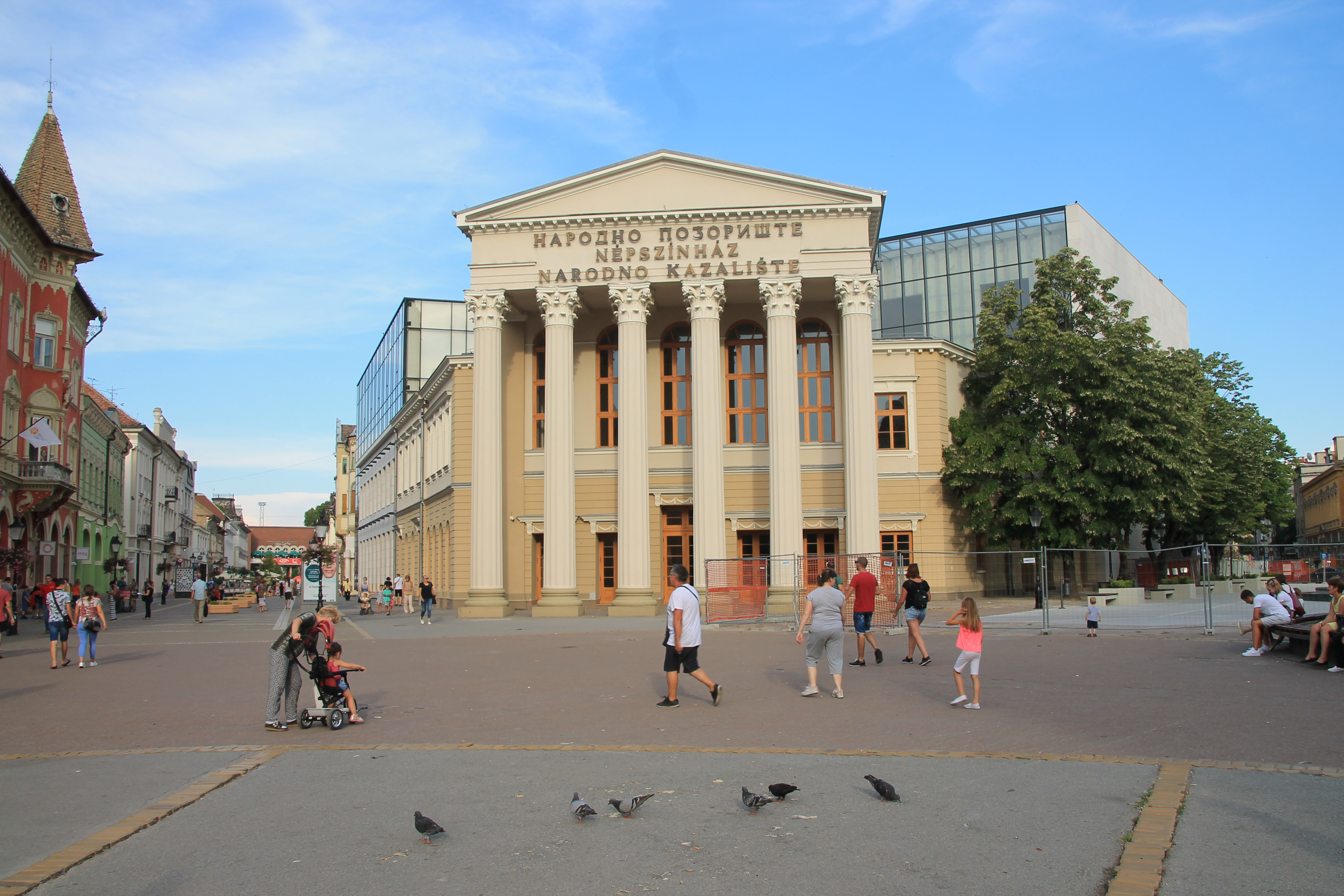
- National Theatre in Subotica, after its reconstruction
- Interactive map of National Theatre in Subotica
- Address: Subotica; Serbia
- Capacity: 500 (Main scene); 266 (Jadran scene); 60 (Studio scene)

Construction
- Opened: 1854
- Rebuilt: 1904, 1924-1927, 1975, 2007-2025
- Architect: János Skultéty (1854 building)

Website
- www.suteatar.org

The National Theatre (Serbian: Народно позориште у Суботици / Narodno Pozorište u Subotici; Croatian: Narodno kazalište u Subotici; Hungarian: Népszínház) is a theater in Subotica, Serbia.

== Reconstruction ==
The original building of the theater, which was built in 1854 as the first monumental public building in Subotica, was razed with the purpose of reconstruction by City authorities in 2007, although it was declared a historic monument under state protection in 1983, and in 1991 it was added to the National Register as a monument of an extraordinary cultural value. An international campaign was organized both in Serbia and in Hungary to save the original building. ICOMOS and INTBAU also protested against the decision, but with no avail. According to some opinions, the old town center of Subotica was severely damaged visually by this action. Some scanty remains of the destroyed building will be allegedly incorporated into the new theater.
