= Montažstroj =

Croatian art collective

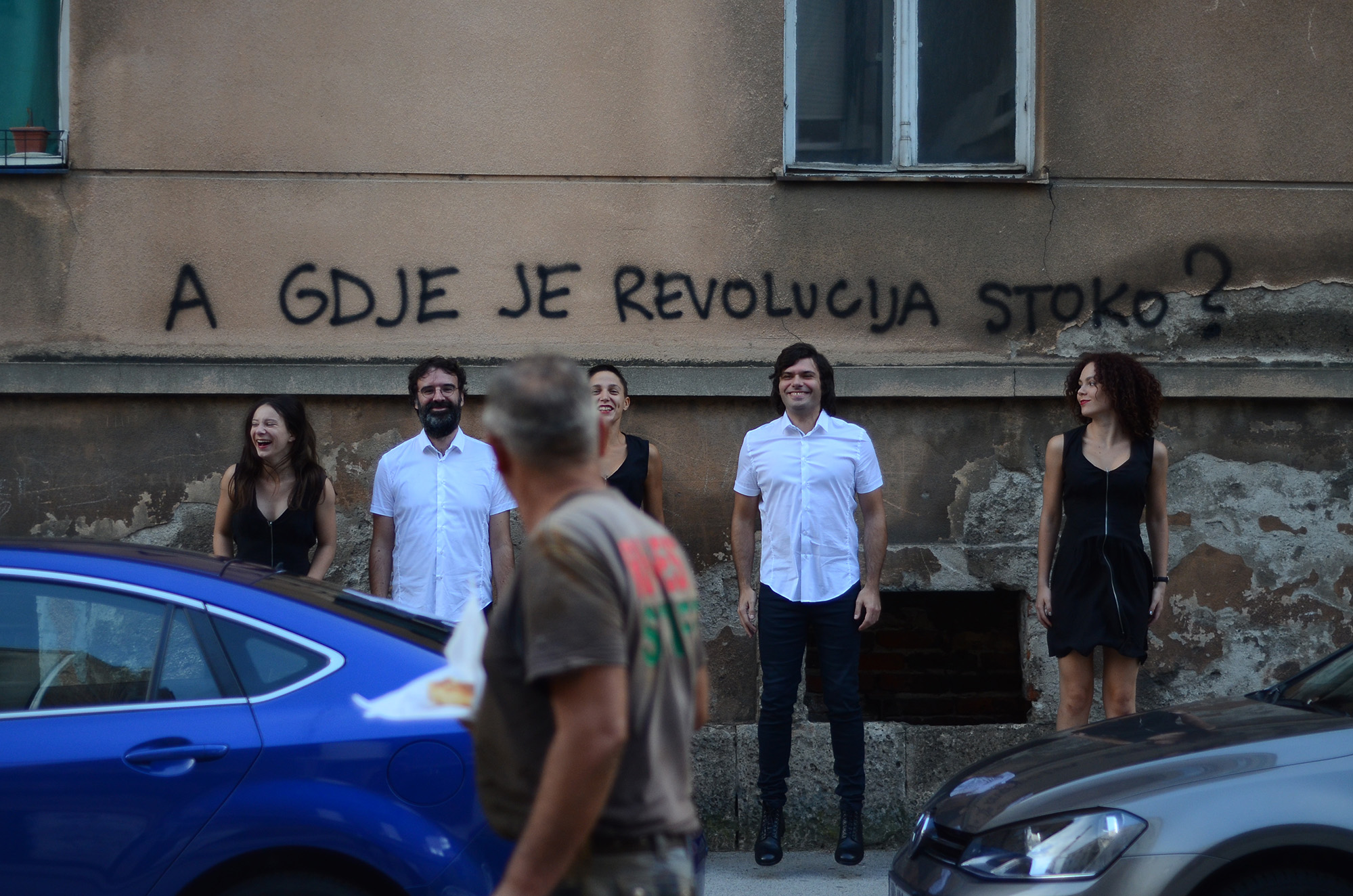
Montažstroj (2014)

Montažstroj (stylized as MONTAŽSTROJ) is a Croatian art collective that produces works across theatre, dance, music, visual, and audiovisual arts. It was founded by artistic director Borut Šeparović in 1989.
