= Phia Ménard =

French juggler, performance artist and director

- Born: 11 February 1971 (age 54); Nantes, France
- Occupation(s): Juggler, performance artist, director

Phia Ménard (born 11 February 1971) is a French juggler, performance artist, and director.

== Biography ==
Phia Ménard came out as a transgender woman in 2008.

Upset by the show Extraballe performed by Jérôme Thomas (1990), she followed her teaching in 1994, then joined her company for the show Hic Hoc (1995), which she performed. In parallel, she follows in 1997 the teachings of dancer and choreographer Hervé Diasnas, founder of the Presence Mobility Danse. Ménard left the Jérôme Thomas company in 2003. She says of Thomas and Diasnas that "they taught her to walk."

In 1998, she founded her own company, Non Nova, with the ambition according to her to abandon the question of virtuosity to work the defect, far from the circus and the juggling, getting closer to the dance, the theater and the performance. Her transition influenced her artistic career. She began the project "I.C.E." (Injonglabilité complementary of the elements), about the study of the imaginary and transformation and the erosion through natural materials. The first show that comes out of this project on 1 May 2018 is P.P.P. (Position parallel to the floor), whose dominant material is I.C.E.

== Works ==
- 1998 : Le Grain
- 2001 : Ascenseur, fantasmagorie pour élever les gens et les fardeaux
- 2002 : Le Grand Bazar
- 2003 : Zapptime, rêve éveillé d’un zappeur
- 2004 : Jongleur pas confondre (conférence-spectacle)
- 2007 : Doggy Bag
- 2008 : P.P.P.
- 2010 : Black Monodie
- 2011 : Vortex
- 2011 : L’après-midi d’un foehn
- 2015 : Belle d’Hier
- 2017 : Les os noirs
- 2018 : Saison sèche
- 2021 : La Trilogie des Contes Immoraux (pour Europe)
- 2022 : Les Enfants terribles by Philip Glass and Jean Cocteau at the Opéra de Rennes
