= Victor Garcia (director) =

Argentine theatre director (1934–1982)

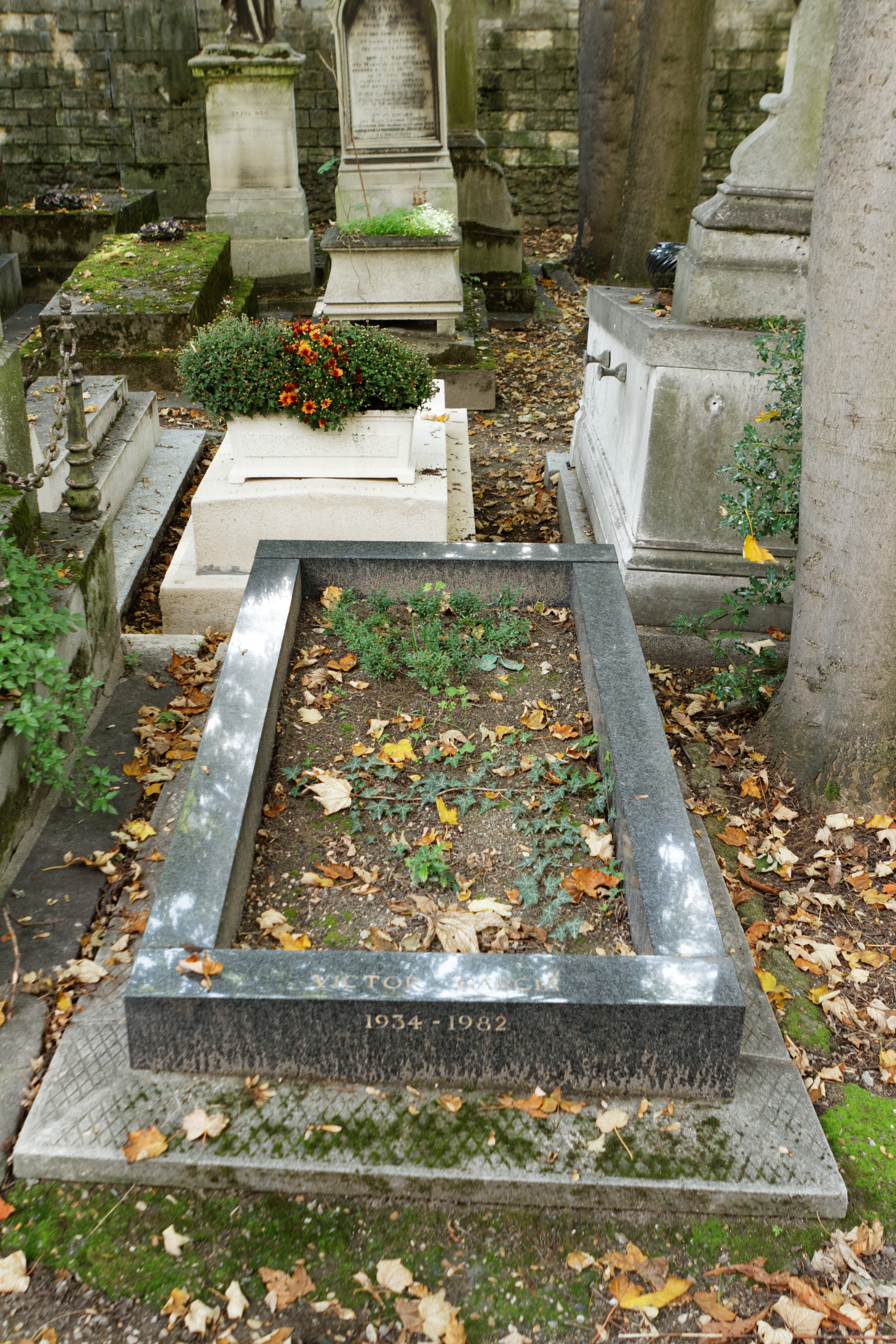
Père-Lachaise Cemetery

Victor Garcia (Pedro Victor Garcia Patta)(Tucumán, Argentina; December 16, 1934 – Paris; August 28, 1982), was an Argentine award-winning theatre director.

He directed a production of Jean Genet's The Balcony at the Ruth Escobar Theatre in São Paulo in 1969, which Genet saw in July 1970. The production was staged under the new regime of Brazil's military dictator General Garrastazu Médici; the actress who played Chantal, Nilda Maria, was arrested for anti-government activities and her children were sent to Public Welfare, prompting Genet to petition the wife of the city's governor for their release. In Garcia's production, the audience observed the action from vertiginous balconies overlooking a pierced 65-foot (20 m) plastic and steel tunnel; the actors performed on platforms within the tunnel, or clinging to its sides, or on the metal ladders that led from one platform to another, creating the impression of animals driven insane within the cages of a zoo. The aim, Garcia explained, was to make the public feel as though it was suspended in a void, with "nothing in front of it nor behind it, only precipices." It won 13 critics' awards in the country and ran for 20 months.

He won the 1973 Drama Desk Award for Outstanding Director and the Award for Outstanding Set Design for his production of Federico García Lorca's Yermawith Nuria Espert and Julieta Serrano.

== Sources ==
- Dichy, Albert. 1993. "Chronology." In White (1993, xiii-xxxv).
- Savona, Jeannette L. 1983. Jean Genet. Grove Press Modern Dramatists ser. New York: Grove P. ISBN 0-394-62045-3.
- White, Edmund. 1993. Genet. Corrected edition. London: Picador, 1994. ISBN 0-330-30622-7
- O TEATRO DE VICTOR GARCIA, JEFFERSON DEL RIOS, Edições Sesc São Paulo. 2012, 288 p. ISBN 978-85-7995-036-0
- Los muros y las puertas en el teatro de Víctor García, Juan Carlos Malcún, Instituto Nacional del Teatro, Buenos Aires, 2011
- Enrique Raab, Periodismo todoterreno: Selección, comentarios y prólogo de María Moreno,
- David Whitton (2005). "Victor Garcia". French Literature Companion. Oxford University Press.
- David Whitton (2005). "Victor Garcia". French Literature Companion. Oxford University Press.
