= Roman Viktyuk =

Soviet theatre director and actor (1936–2020)

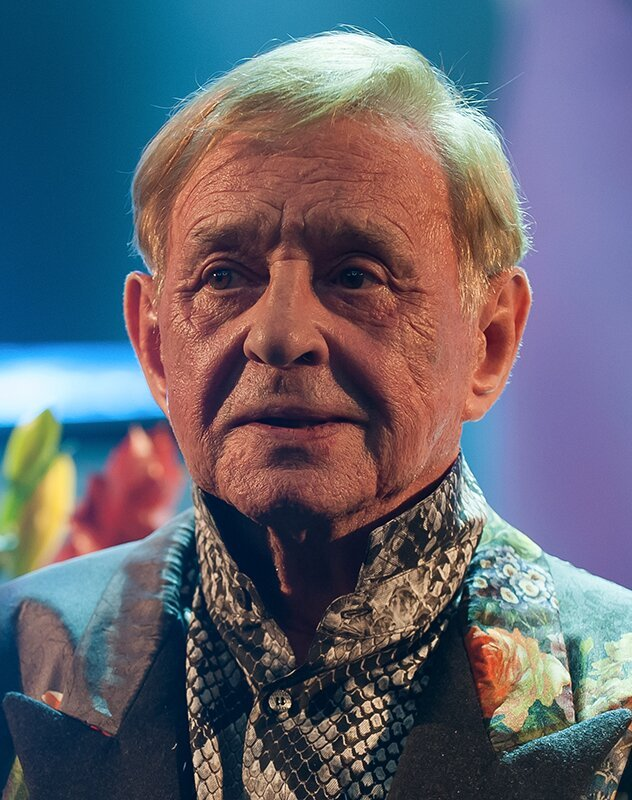
- Born: 28 October 1936; Lwów, Second Polish Republic (present day Lviv, Ukraine)
- Died: 17 November 2020 (aged 84); Moscow, Russia
- Resting place: Lychakiv Cemetery, Lviv
- Occupations: theater director, theater teacher
- Years active: 1956–2020

Roman Hryhorovych Viktyuk (Ukrainian: Роман Григорович Віктюк; Russian: Роман Григорьевич Виктюк, romanized: Roman Grigoryevich Viktyuk; 28 October 1936 – 17 November 2020) was a Soviet and Russian Ukrainian-born theatre director, actor and screenwriter.

== Biography ==
Viktyuk was born in Lwów, Poland, now Lviv, Ukraine. In 1956 he graduated from the Russian Academy of Theatre Arts in Moscow. Among his teachers were Yuri Zavadsky and Anatoly Efros.

He worked in theaters in Lviv, Kalinin, Tallinn, Vilnius, Minsk, Kyiv, Odessa and Moscow. In the mid-1970s he began to stage performances in Moscow. In the mid-1980s on the stage of the Moscow City Council Theatre he put on the play by Leonid Zorin, Royal Hunt. He gained great fame thanks to The Maids by Jean Genet, staged at the Satyricon in 1988. Since 1991, as artistic director and director, he established a private theater (Roman Viktyuk Theater), which in 1996 became state theater. He was the director of a number of dramas on Central Television (Players, 1978, The History of the Chevalier des Grieux and Manon Lescaut, 1980 and Girl, Where Do You Live?, 1982). He was also Professor of the Russian Academy of Theatre Arts (GITIS).

== Death ==
In late October 2020, Russian media reported that Viktyuk had been taken to an intensive care unit in Moscow after being infected with COVID-19 during the COVID-19 pandemic in Russia. He died there of an associated thromboembolism on 17 November 2020.

== Honours and awards ==
- Kyiv Pectoral Award in Best Performance Drama Theatre (1991)
- Honored Artist of Russia (2003)
- People's Artist of Ukraine (2006)
- People's Artist of Russia (2009)
