= Tomaž Pandur =

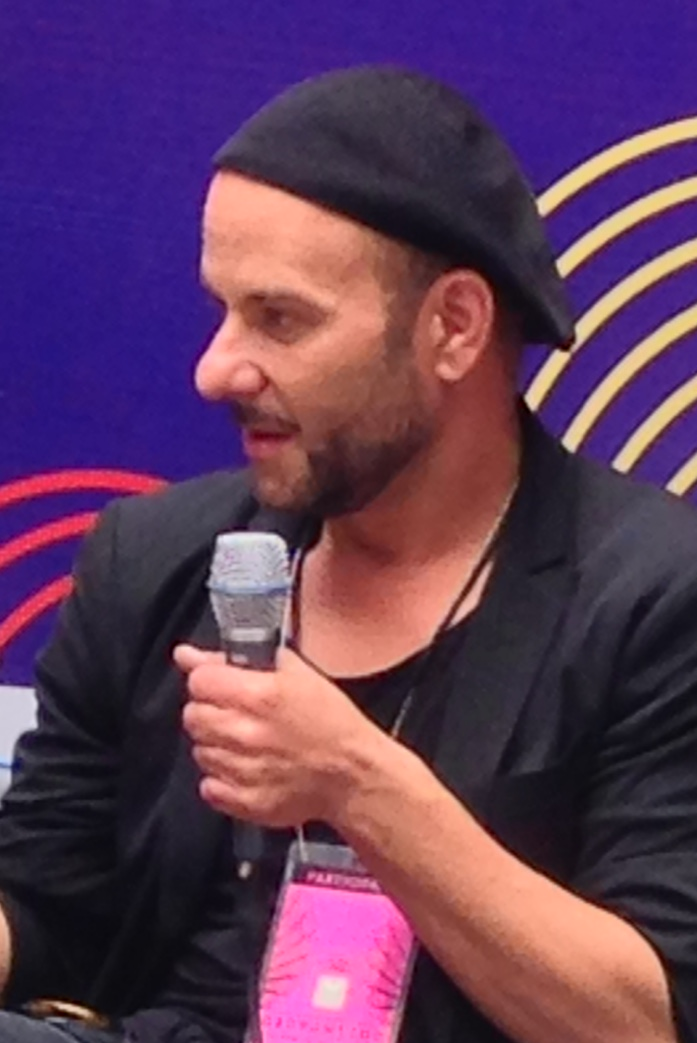
- Pandur in Mexico during 2015
- Born: 19 February 1963; Maribor, former Yugoslavia, now Slovenia
- Died: 12 April 2016 (aged 53); Skopje, Republic of North Macedonia
- Occupation: Theatre director

Tomaž Pandur (19 February 1963 – 12 April 2016) was a Slovenian theatre director.

== Career as a director ==
=== In Slovenia ===
As a student of Maribor Grammar School No. 1 he established his own theatre group "Tespisov voz – Novo slovensko gledališče". He graduated on AGRTF in 1988. His Scheherazade (1988) was a sensation. In 1989 he became art director of the Drama section of the Maribor Slovene National Theatre. During this time his productions of Hamlet, Faust, Carmen, and Divine Comedy has put it on the top of contemporary Slovenian director in theatre.

== Personal life ==
Because of the rumours regarding his financial matters, he left Slovenia and moved to New York City, US, where he was living until 1990. In the last years of his life he lived and worked in Madrid, Spain.
