= Guy Weizman =

Choreographer

Guy Weizman (1973) is a choreographer, director, and the general and artistic director of NITE (formerly NNT). Together with Roni Haver, Weizman founded the dance company Club Guy & Roni. As of May 1, 2023, all theatre productions of the Noord Nederlands Toneel are presented under the name NITE - National Interdisciplinary Theater Ensemble.

Guy Weizman is a core member of the Social Creative Council and a member of the Academy of Arts.

== Career ==
He then danced with various companies in Berlin, Barcelona, and with Galili Dance in Groningen. In 2002, together with Roni Haver (1972), he founded the international dance company Club Guy & Roni in Groningen. Their approach emphasizes collaboration with artists from other disciplines, such as actors, writers, musicians, and filmmakers.

On January 1, 2017, Weizman became not only the artistic director of Club Guy & Roni but also the artistic and general director of the Noord Nederlands Toneel. In early 2023, the Noord Nederlands Toneel changed its name to NITE: National Interdisciplinary Theater Ensemble.

In March 2023, he was appointed as a member of the Academy of Arts.

== Prizes and nominations ==
Carrousel, Weizman's debut production as artistic director of the Noord Nederlands Toneel, was nominated for the Mime Prize in 2017.

In 2018, Weizman won the Best Director Award at the Theater Gala for his direction of the production Salam, performed by NITE and including members of Club Guy & Roni.

In 2023, Yara's Wedding and The Underground were selected by the jury of the Dutch Theatre Festival as two of the best productions of the Dutch theatre season.

== Choreographer and director ==
- 2025 Nachtwacht, coproduction NITE, Club Guy & Roni, HIIIT, Asko|Schönberg, and NKK NXT
- 2024 Faith, coproduction Club Guy & Roni, HIIIT, and Cie 2K_Far
- 2023 Yara's Wedding, coproduction NITE, Club Guy & Roni, Slagwerk Den Haag, Asko|Schönberg, and Schauspiel Hannover
- 2022 The Underground, coproduction NITE, Club Guy & Roni, Slagwerk Den Haag, and Asko|Schönberg
- 2022 Fortune, corpoduction Navdhara India Dance Theatre, and Slagwerk Den Haag
- 2021 Freedom, coproduction Slagwerk Den Haag
- 2020 Swan Lake the Game, coproduction Slagwerk Den Haag and Tomoko Mukaiyama Foundation, music by Kordz
- 2020 Swan Lake, coproduction Slagwerk Den Haag and Tomoko Mukaiyama Foundation, music by Kordz
- 2020 Before/After, coproduction Noord Nederlands Toneel, Slagwerk Den Haag and Asko|Schönberg, music by Luke Deane
- 2019 LOVE, coproduction GöteborgsOperans Danskompani, Slagwerk Den Haag and Asko|Schönberg
- 2019 Brave New World 2.0, coproduction Noord Nederlands Toneel, Slagwerk Den Haag and Asko|Schönberg
- 2018 Tetris Mon Amour, coproduction with Slagwerk Den Haag, music bij Thijs de vlieger (NOISIA)
- 2018 Salam, coproduction Noord Nederlands Toneel, Club Guy & Roni, Asko|Schönberg
- 2017 Carrousel, coproduction Noord Nederlands Toneel, Club Guy & Roni, Asko|Schönbergs K[h]AOS
- 2016 Happiness, coproduction with Slagwerk Den Haag
- 2015 Phobia, coproduction with EN-KNAP (SI) and Slagwerk Den Haag
- 2015 Sparks, Festival Classique, was broadcast live on Dutch national television. In cooperation with The Hague Philharmonic (Residentie Orkest)
- 2015 Mechanical Ecstasy, with musicians of Slagwerk Den Haag, music composition by Jan-Bas Bollen and Thijs de Vlieger (NOISIA).
- 2014 My Private Odyssey, coproduction with tanzmainz / Staatstheater Mainz (DE) and musicians Tomoko Mukaiyama, Monica Germino and Anne La Berge. Music composition David Dramm and Tomoko Mukaiyama.
- 2014 Gift for Infinity (RUG), performance 400 year anniversary of the Groningen University with Noord Nederlands Orkest, WERC video collective and media artist Jan Klug.
- 2013 Naked Lunch, coproduction with the musicians of Slagwerk Den Haag and vocalists of Silbersee. Music composition Yannis Kyriakides. Text by Oscar van Woensel.
- 2013 CRASH, coproduction with NNT
- 2013 L’Histoire du Soldat, with musicians of Lunapark
- 2012 Midnight Rising, with the Israeli singer-songwriter Ehud Banai
- 2011 Miraculous Wednesday, coproduction with State Theater Oldenburg (DE)
- 2010 Alpha Boys
- 2010 Four Walls
- 2010 FKK
- 2009 Heelhuids & Halsoverkop, coproduction with NNT
- 2009 Desert Highway
- 2009 Pinball and Grace
- 2008 Poetic Disasters
- 2007 Myrrh and Cinnamon
- 2005 Language of Walls

== Guest choreographer / director ==
- 2015 Noord Nederlands Toneel (NL) - De Twaalf Gezworenen
- 2014 Staatstheater Oldenburg (DE) - Finale Grande
- 2014 Theatre Ballet Moscow (RU) - OpArt
- 2013 Staatstheater Oldenburg (DE) - Romeo et Juliette
- 2013 The Göteborg Opera (SE) – Mama I'm Coming Home
- 2011 Tsekh Contemporary Dance Centre, Moscow (RU) - L'Histoire du Soldat
- 2010 Staatstheater Oldenburg (DE) - Air Ways
- 2009 Carte Blanche, Bergen (NO) – When Clarity Visits
- 2009 Schauspiel Kölln (DE) - 60 Years
- 2007 Scapino Ballet (NL) – Bowler's Heaven
- 2002 Ballet du Nord (FR) – Silence pas de Silence
- 1999 Galili Dance (NL) – In Remains

== Media ==
In 2021, the documentary Guy Weizman - Voorheen/Nadien, about Weizman’s creative struggles during the making of the performance Before/After, was broadcast by NTR on NPO 2 as part of the series Het Uur van de Wolf.

The documentary premiered at the international film festival Cinedans in Amsterdam and was directed by Willem Baptist.
