= Ivana Stefanović =

Serbian composer (born 1948)

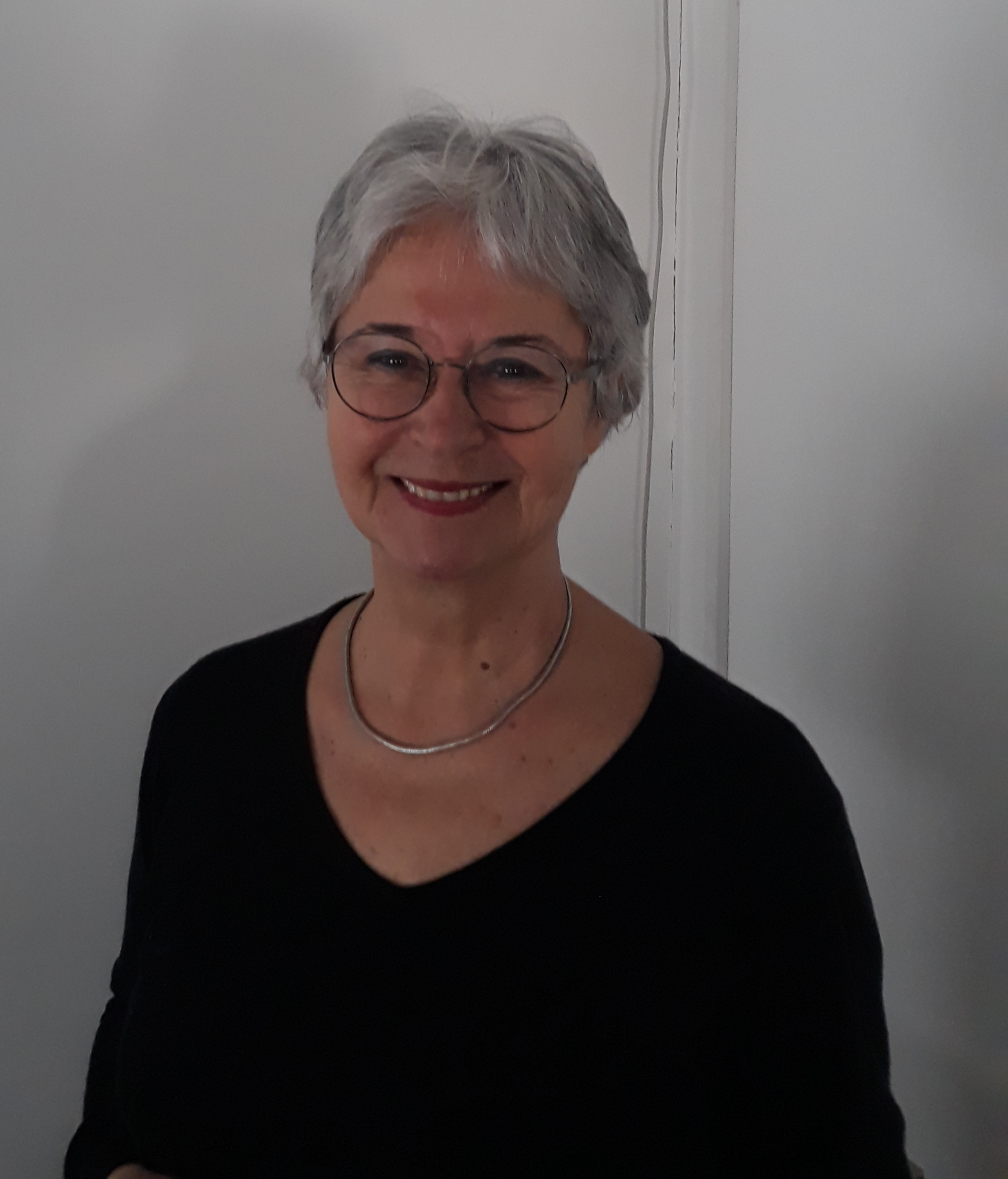
Ivana Stefanović

Ivana Stefanović (born 14 September 1948) is a Serbian composer.

== Biography ==
Ivana Stefanović was born in Belgrade. She studied violin and composition, graduating from the Faculty of Music Arts (FMA) in Belgrade. She continued her studies at the Institute for Research and Coordination Acoustics/Music IRCAM in Paris. Her compositions were first performed in 1966 and have been presented internationally.

In 1968 Stefanović took a position with Radio Belgrade writing music and program leads. In 1970 she began working for Television Belgrade, preparing and maintaining cultural programs. In 1975 she was employed as a music editor, in 1985 became the first editor of the Workshops Sound Drama program, and in 1989 chief editor of Radio Belgrade. In 2000 she began teaching at the Center for Women's Studies. From 2001–2006 she was the artistic director of the Bemus Music Festival. From 2007–2008 she served as State Secretary of Culture of Serbia.

Stefanović has lived in Damascus, Ankara and currently resides in Bucharest, Romania. She has written a book titled Put za Damask (Road to Damascus), and has published professional articles on music and culture in newspapers and magazines.

== Works ==
Ivana Stefanović composes for radio and for theater, and has completed music for over forty plays. Selected works include:

- 2010 Poet in a glass box - Fairy Tale for soprano and chamber ensemble
- 2009 Short debt for percussion ensemble, 4 performers
- 2008 It for female voice, flute, piano, cello Text: Ljubomir Simović
- 2005 Unusual scene with Homer's grave in Smyrna - new contributions for the Hans Christian Andersen for solo flute, piano, harpsichord, accordion, percussion, strings and narrator, Text H.K. Andersen
- 2003 Ordinary conversations for oboe and violin
- 2003 Over water for soprano, flute and piano
- 2003 Verses Hellenic meličara: Sappho, Alcaeus and Alkman
- 2002 If the Lord does not for mixed choir. Version for female choir a cappella Text from the Orthodox prayer book
- 1998 The first eastern dream landscape of the strip Produced by ORF (Austrian Radio)
- 1997 Tree of Life for string orchestra
- 1997 Antioch songs for mixed choir and caprella speechless
- 1996 Music for June for flute and piano (or harp)
- 1996 Instrumental Song for high female voice and piano.
- 1995 Tibul against the war for mixed choir and timpani Text: Tibul
- 1994 And in the distance a garden full of flowers for solo violin, Dedication to Matthew Marinkovic
- 1994 Circle music for tape, choreodrama
- 1993 Strindberg play
- 1993 String Quartet No. 3
- 1993 Signs along the road for flute and piano, harp, harpsichord
- 1993 Lacrimosa radio drama, produced by ORF (Austrian Radio)
- 1993 Piano pieces {Play, Toccata, only for the left, Dungeon, Watches, Time, January, Satirical}
- 1993 Music for March for piano or harpsichord
- 1992 Isidora ballet, tape-music, libretto and choreography: Jelena Santic
- 1992 Metropolis of Silence/Stari Ras Poem for radio
- 1992 Four night results for solo viola and 13 strings
- 1990 Psalm for mixed choir and solo soprano Text from the Orthodox liturgy
- 1989 And the help niodkudu the old instruments, percussion and strings
- 1989 Lingua/Phonia/Patria for radio, Radio co-production and studio Hörspiel WDR Cologne
- 1988 Lullabies for mezzo-soprano, harpsichord and string orchestra
- 1986 Dedication for piano, dedicated to her father
- 1986 November, November ... Quasi una fantasia for solo cello
- 1984 Dream Interpretation for flute, tape, a female voice the voice and stage movement Text Rosa Luxemburg (Luxemburg) and Vesna Krmpotić.
- 1981 Mimicry for flute choir (14 performers)
- 1980 Torsion joints for solo violin.
- 1980 Paysage for harpsichord and tape
- 1979 What to do with a bird at a Glance for percussion ensemble (4 artists) and tape
- 1979 Fragment of a possible order for six keyboard instruments (two pianos, organ, celeste, klavsen, accordion)
- 1978 Hommage à Villon the old instruments (7 artists) and two voices (soprano and mezzo-soprano or tenor) Text: François Vijon (François Villon)
- 1978 Incantations for soprano and chamber orchestra (14 artists), Text: The Egyptian Book of the Dead
- 1977 Button stray children's opera Soloists, children's choir, chamber ensemble Author: Predrag Čudić
- 1977 Dushan's Code For old instruments (5 artist)
- 1976 For Irena for solo flute, is dedicated to Irena Grafenauer
- 1976 Harmony, string quartet no. 2
- 1976 Harmony Version for string orchestra
- 1976 Part singing for two flutes and electric piano. Duration 5 '
- 1974 Epistle to the birds Experimental Radio Production, Co-authors Marjan Radojičić and Predrag Knezevic
- 1974 Kust for Bassoon and Piano
- 1974 My world for soprano and piano. Text: Desanka Maksimović
- 1974 Cabana cantata for soprano, alto, children's and mixed choir, and symphony orchestra, texts of North American Indians
- 1974 Sickness or death that occurs for soprano, contralto, recital, trumpet, timpani, harp, organ and piano. Text: Henry Miso (Anry Micheaux)
- 1969 String Quartet no. 1
- 1969 Length 20
- 1968 Passcaglia and Fugue for solo violin
