= Hrvatsko slovo =

Croatian magazine (e. 1995)

Hrvatsko slovo (lit. "Croatian letter") was a weekly culture magazine from Zagreb. It was founded in 1995 by prominent Croatian writers Mile Pešorda, Dubravko Horvatić, Nedjeljko Fabrio, Stjepan Šešelj and Mile Maslać.

At the founding meeting in Zagreb, held on March 28, 1995, the concept of the new weekly magazine, presented by Dubravko Horvatić, was accepted, as well as Milo Pešorda's proposal that the magazine bears the name Hrvatsko slovo. The first issue was published in Zagreb on April 28, 1995, by its founders, writer Dubravko Horvatić, editor-in-chief, Stjepan Šešelj, director, Mile Pešorda, deputy editor-in-chief and editor for literature, and DHK president Nedjeljko Fabrio. One of the co-creators was the Croatian poet Mile Maslać, later deputy editor-in-chief of the newspaper. The magazine published works of Hrvoje Hitrec, Zoran Tadić, Sven Lasta, Mirko Marjanović, Ljubica Štefan and many others.

Hrvatsko slovo has been discontinued on 11 February 2022, citing lack of financial support requested from the Ministry of Culture and Media.

== Notable contributors ==
Many prominent Croatians have contributed to the magazine.

Notable contributors from various fields, such writers, artists, scientists, as well as experts in various fields, include Vlado Andrilović, Ivan Aralica, Ivan Babić, Stjepan Šulek (editor-in-chief), Franjo Brkić, Emil Čić, Tomislav Dretar, Malkica Dugeč, Nela Eržišnik, Dubravko Horvatić, Marijan Krmpotić, Krešimir Mišak, Javor Novak, Mladen Pavković, Mile Pešorda, Zlatko Tomičić, Marijan Horvat-Mileković, Tomislav Sunić, Tin Kolumbić, Nevenka Nekic, Zvonimir Magdić, Ivan Sionić, Ivan Biondić, Branimir Souček, Zoran Vukman, Branka Hlevnjak, Igor Mrduljaš, Nenad Piskač, Esad Jogić, Lidija Bajuk, Željko Sabol, Ivan Boždar (alias Satir or wild man), Damir Pesord, Benjamin Tolić, Davor Dijanović, Ivica Luetić, Sanja Nikčević, Ati Salvaro and others.

== Publishing ==
Hrvatsko slovo has published in its own "Library of Hrvasko Slovo" works of these Croatian and other distinguished writers: Veljko Barbieri, Mirko Marjanović, Đurđica Ivanišević, Hrvoje Hitrec, Stjepan Šešelj, Igor Mrduljaš, Ljubica Štefan, Sven Lasta, Maja Freundlich, Dubravko Horvatić, Benjamin Tolić, Milan Vuković, Zoran Tadić, Mladen Rojnica, Mate Kovačević, Pero Pavlović and others.

== Awards created ==
The magazine established two prizes: Dubravko Horvatić Prize (for prose and poetry) and Ljubica Štefan Prize (for historical and scientific contributions).
