= Antun Branko Šimić Award =

- Native name: Nagrada Antun Branko Šimić
- Awarded for: Contributions to Croatian poetry
- Sponsored by: Croatian Writers' Society of Herzeg-Bosnia
- Location: Bosnia and Herzegovina
- First award: 1998 (Reinstated)

The Antun Branko Šimić Award (Croatian: Nagrada Antun Branko Šimić) is an award for contributions to Croatian poetry by Croats from Bosnia and Herzegovina or members of the Croatian Writers' Society of Herzeg-Bosnia. It is named after the Herzegovinian Croat poet Antun Branko Šimić. It was briefly awarded in Yugoslavia under the name Braća Šimić Award and was later reinstated under its current name in 1998.

== Awardees ==
- 1998: Gojko Sušac for Jutarnja novost
- 1999: Zdravko Kordić for Zipka i smrt
- 2000: Željko Ivanković for (D)ogledi III. and Dubravko Horvatić for Svjetionik
- 2001: Ante Matić for Nebeska galija and Pero Pavlović for Nebeske latice
- 2002: Andrija Vučemil for Glas (na)glas za glas and Nenad Valentin Borozan for lišce.teret od zrcala
- 2003: Ružica Soldo for Sanjar
- 2004: Zdravko Luburić for Molitva tmine
- 2005: Mile Maslać for Vrijeme pripravnosti
- 2006: Borislav Arapović for Prolomom
- 2007: Malkica Dugeč for U riječ unjedrena
- 2008: Rajko Glibo for Očitovanja and Antun Lučić for Veze ljudi, životinja i stvari
- 2009: Mile Pešorda for Baščanska ploča, poema
- 2010: Šimun Musa for Studije i ogledi
- 2011: Ante Stamać for Sabrane pjesme
- 2012: S. Marija od Presvetoga Srca (Anka Petričević) for Pjesme srca
- 2013: Julienne Eden Bušić for Živa glava
- 2014: Ivan Aralica for Japundže
- 2015: Ante Zirdum for Učiteljica modnog krojenja u Sarajevu 2014.
- 2016: Drago Čondrič for Sedam velikih biblijskih poema
- 2017: Ljubo Krmek for Iz humske zemlje-knjiga druga
- 2018: Marina Kljajo-Radić for Pjesništvo Lucijana Kordića
- 2019: Joso Živković for Tragom pokorenih želja
- 2020: Tomislav Marijan Bilosnić for Havana blues
- 2021:
- 2022: Stijepo Mijović Kočan for Bože moj
