= Savo Zlatić =

Croatian politician (1912–2007)

Savo Vjerko Zlatić (12 July 1912 – 8 December 2007) was a Croatian physician, politician and chess composer.

Early in life, as a medical student, Zlatić became a high-ranking member of the then-illegal Communist Party. In World War II, he became the first Partisan physician in Croatia and one of the founders of Petrova Gora hospital. He was expelled from the Communist Party in 1949 and subsequently served two years in Goli Otok prison for siding with Stalin's position in the Tito–Stalin Split. After his release from prison, Zlatić focused on scientific work; he is considered one of the founders of clinical pharmacology in Croatia. Zlatić also had a long competitive career as a chess composer and was awarded the title of World Federation for Chess Composition Honorary Master in 1999.

== Early life ==
Zlatić was born in 1912 in Lanišće, a village in Istria, Croatia, into a Catholic family. His parents were teachers. After the Italian occupation of Istria in 1918, the family lived as refugees in Trieste and Slovenia, finally settling in Zagreb in 1921.

In 1932, as a medical student, Zlatić joined the movement against the 6 January Dictatorship of King Alexander and took part in demonstrations against the regime. In 1933, with his former schoolmates, he founded an illegal communist group. After joining the Communist Party in 1934, Zlatić advanced through the party ranks and became one of the leaders of the League of Communist Youth of Yugoslavia in 1935.

For his illegal political activities, in April 1935 Zlatić was arrested and tortured by the police. He was tried before the Court for the Protection of the State and sent to Sremska Mitrovica prison. After his release in 1938, he made contact with Josip Broz Tito, head of the Communist Party of Yugoslavia. In the following years, Zlatić spent most of his time establishing Communist Party cells in Zagreb, in accordance with Tito's instructions. In December 1939 he was arrested again and imprisoned in Lepoglava. Shortly after his release in 1940, Zlatić passed his final exams and received a medical degree.

== World War II ==
In August 1941, after the establishment of the Axis-aligned Independent State of Croatia, by Party decision Zlatić was sent to the Kordun region to help provide medical care to Partisan troops. The medical field work proved to be very risky, as it involved hours of traveling on foot to reach the wounded, crossing guarded roads and railway tracks in the process. This led to a decision to build an improvised hospital in the Partisan-controlled area of Petrova Gora mountain. The hospital, co-founded by Zlatić, became operative in October 1941. After it was discovered and destroyed by enemy forces, it was rebuilt in a different location on Petrova Gora. The new hospital remained undetected for the duration of the war, treating more than 5,000 patients. Apart from general medical work in the hospital, Zlatić also performed minor surgery.

Zlatić's Kordun assignment ended in late 1943, when he became a member of the Politburo of the Communist Party of Croatia. He performed political duties until the end of the war.

== Goli Otok imprisonment and later life ==
In 1946 Zlatić became a Yugoslav envoy to Albania. After the Tito–Stalin split in 1948, in which Albania sided with the Soviet Union and against Yugoslavia, Zlatić was summoned back to the country and named Minister of Industry. On several occasions he openly argued in favor of accepting Stalin's demands. For this, Zlatić was removed from his post. In 1949 he was expelled from the Communist Party, arrested, and sentenced to two years' imprisonment in Goli Otok prison camp.

In 1951 Zlatić was released, having signed a public statement in which he denounced his views. He became an advisor in the Ministry of Health and, later, the head of the Ministry's newly established Medical Equipment and Drugs Department. He was instrumental in advancing the country's production, testing and procurement of modern medical equipment, drugs and vaccines. Still, despite offers, he declined to be readmitted to the Communist Party.

Zlatić's most important contributions were in the field of clinical pharmacology. He was an editor-in-chief of Pharmaca, a Yugoslav pharmaceutical journal established in 1965, and one of the creators of the Yugoslav Classification of Drugs, a work that predated the World Health Organization's Anatomical Therapeutic Chemical Classification System.

Like many other former political prisoners, Zlatić was monitored by UDBA, the Yugoslav secret police, using a wide network of informers which included his friends and coworkers. Reports about Zlatić noted he still harbored sympathies for the Soviet Union, but had no interest in politics, having focused on his scientific work. He remained under close surveillance until 1964, and appeared as an UDBA's person of interest as late as 1986.

== Chess composition ==
Although Zlatić was a successful amateur chess player in his youth, he took up chess composition only in 1950, in Petrinjska Street prison in Zagreb, using chess pieces made of bread. After his release from prison, Nenad Petrović, Croatian Grandmaster for Chess Composition, encouraged him to continue his work on chess problems. In the inaugural national chess composition championships, Zlatić took gold in all four categories (two-movers, three-movers, helpmates and studies), and became an international competitor in the Yugoslav and, later, Croatian national chess composition team. The World Federation for Chess Composition awarded him the titles of International Judge (1958) and Honorary Master for Chess Composition (1999).

== Sources ==
- Previšić, Martin (2014). Povijest informbiroovskog logora na Golom otoku 1949. –1956 [History of the Goli Otok Cominformist Prison Camp 1949. – 1956.] (PDF) (in Croatian). Faculty of Humanities and Social Sciences, University of Zagreb.
- Stipančević, Mario (April 2004). "Razgovor s dr. Savom Zlatićem" [Interview with Savo Zlatić, M.D.] (PDF). Arhivski Vjesnik (in Croatian). 47 (1). Zagreb: Croatian State Archives: 119–132.
