= Ženi Lebl =

Yugoslav-Israeli historian of the Holocaust in the Balkans

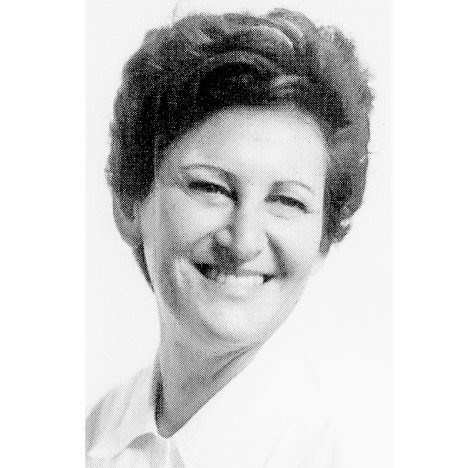
- Born: 20 June 1927; Aleksinac, Kingdom of Serbs, Croats and Slovenes
- Died: 21 October 2009 (aged 82); Tel Aviv, Israel
- Other names: Jennie Lebl; Jennie Lebel; Jovanka Lebl; Jovanka Lazić
- Education: University of Belgrade
- Occupations: Journalist, author, historian
- Known for: Chronicler of the Holocaust in the Balkans
- Notable work: Tide and Wreck (1986); Ljubičica bela (The White Violet; 1990); Until "the Final Solution" (2001)

Ženi Lebl (Serbian: Жени Лебл; Hebrew: ג'ני לבל; 20 June 1927 – 21 October 2009) was a Yugoslav-Serbian-Israeli writer, journalist and historian. A Holocaust survivor, she became involved in the Partisan underground during the Nazi occupation of Yugoslavia. After her arrest in 1943, she was imprisoned and sent to forced labour before being held at the Gestapo headquarters in Berlin, where she was sentenced to death. She was liberated during the Battle of Berlin before the sentence was carried out.

After the Second World War, Lebl worked as a journalist for Politika newspaper in Belgrade. In 1949, she was arrested by the Yugoslav secret police for failing to report a joke about Josip Broz Tito. She spent more than two years in political prisons and corrective labour camps, including Goli Otok, where she was subjected to forced labour, abuse and sexual violence. After her release, she emigrated to Israel in 1954.

From the late 1970s, Lebl published works on Jewish history in the Balkans, the Holocaust, and her experiences during the Nazi occupation and her postwar imprisonment in Yugoslavia. Her books included The White Violet (1990), an account of her imprisonment that became a bestseller in Israel, and Until the Final Solution: The Jews in Belgrade 1521–1942 (2001), a history of Belgrade's Jewish community drawing on two decades of research. Her work was praised by historians of the Holocaust, and Lebl continued to write and research Jewish history until her death in Tel Aviv in 2009; the Federation of Jewish Communities of Serbia later named its annual literary award in her honour.

== Biography ==
=== Early years ===
Ženi Lebl was born on 20 June 1927 in Aleksinac, Kingdom of Serbs, Croats and Slovenes, into a secular Jewish Ashkenazi family originally from Zemun. She was the second child of mining engineer Leon Lebl (1888–1965) and his wife, Ana, née Robiček. Both Leon and his father had taken part in the Great Serbian Retreat during World War I. Ana was active in a charitable organisation that supported Serbian Orthodox churches and helped fund a memorial church at Deligrad. Lebl had an older brother, Aleksandar "Saša" (1922–2020). In 1933, the family moved back to Belgrade.

After completing primary school, Lebl attended the First Girls' Gymnasium (Prva ženska realna gimnazija) in Belgrade. (Note: Now known as the Fifth Belgrade Gymnasium.) In 1940, she joined the then-underground League of Communist Youth of Yugoslavia (SKOJ) through the patronage of an older girl, becoming its youngest member at just under fourteen years of age.

=== World War II ===
Following Nazi Germany's invasion of Yugoslavia and occupation of Serbia in 1941, Jewish men in Belgrade were arrested and held as hostages. Lebl's father, a reserve lieutenant colonel in the Royal Yugoslav Army, was arrested and sent to an officers' POW camp in Germany. German forces began executing Jewish and Serb hostages in response to an uprising in Serbia; by the end of the year most of Serbia's Jewish men had been killed. Lebl's brother Sasha left Belgrade on 25 October 1941, after their mother obtained forged documents identifying him as Italian-born, which allowed him to leave for Split in the Italian occupation zone. (Note: Lebl's brother later joined the Yugoslav Partisans and the Rab battalion following Italy's capitulation.) On 8 December 1941, the surviving Jewish women and children were ordered to report to the police for internment at Sajmište concentration camp. After witnessing a Nazi officer shoot and kill the family's dog, Lebl became convinced that she was in danger. The night before she was due to report to Sajmište, she fled Belgrade, boarding the first train she found. The train was carrying Serbs from Sombor fleeing the Hungarian-occupied territories.

She travelled to Niš, near the Bulgarian border, where she came under the care of her former schoolteacher from Aleksinac, Jelena Glavaski. With Glavaski's help, she obtained false papers and adopted a new identity: Jovanka Lazić, a Serb and refugee from Sombor, hiding her Jewish heritage. The two became involved in producing Partisan literature, and ran an illegal printing press in the attic of a house. In spring 1942, Lebl's mother, grandmother and other relatives, who were detained at Sajmište concentration camp, were killed in a gas van by German soldiers. (Note: By May 1942, about 93 per cent of all Jews of Serbia had been killed by the Nazis.)

By late 1942, Bulgarian military intelligence had infiltrated the Communist Party of Yugoslavia's network in Niš. On 22 February 1943, following a betrayal by an underground party member, Lebl and Glavaski were captured by the Bulgarian police. Glavaski was executed by firing squad, (Note: Glavaski was posthumously recognised as Righteous Among the Nations.) while Lebl, being a minor, was interrogated and imprisoned at the Bulgarian Army Command in Yugoslavia, where she endured torture and sexual violence before being transferred to German custody. Still under her assumed name Jovanka Lazić, she was deported in freight cars to Maribor and then, via Wiener Neustadt, Austria, to Berlin for forced labour. She was later transferred to a Gestapo prison in Berlin, where, on 20 April 1945, she was sentenced to death on the personal orders of Heinrich Himmler, alongside fourteen other female prisoners. The sentence was never carried out, as she was liberated during the Battle of Berlin.

=== Journalism career and imprisonment ===
In late May 1945, Lebl returned to Belgrade, her father returned from German captivity in July her brother was demobilised in late 1945. She completed secondary school and studied law at Belgrade University and journalism at the Higher School of Journalism and Diplomacy (Visoka novinarsko-diplomatska škola). After entering a writing competition organised by Politika, she began working for the newspaper, having been personally selected by Milovan Djilas. At the newspaper, she continued to use the nom de guerre Jovanka Lebl.

A colleague told her a joke about Yugoslavia winning an international flower exhibition thanks to a 100-kilogram white violet, referring to the song about Marshal Tito, Druže Tito, ljubičice bela, tebe voli omladina cela ('Comrade Tito, white violet, the entire youth loves you'). Lebl repeated the joke in the newsroom. On 28 April 1949, she was arrested by the secret police (UDB) and charged with "slander against the people and the state" under Clause 6 of Yugoslavia's Transgression Law. Lebl later learned that the colleague who had told her the joke, a party informant and agent provocateur, had reported her for failing to report him to the UDB.

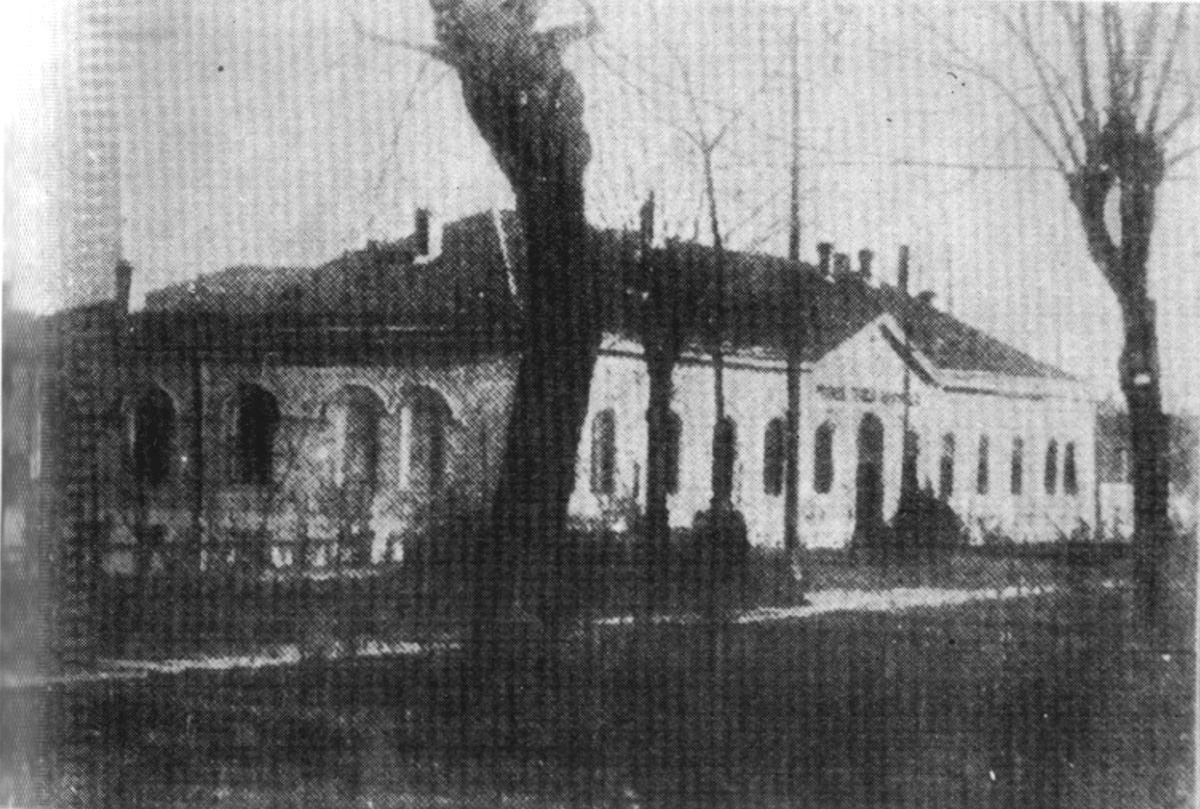
Glavnjača, the main prison for political prisoners in Belgrade, one of the facilities where Lebl was held.

From April 1949 to October 1951, Lebl was held in a series of political prisons and so-called re-education camp, including Belgrade's Glavnjača, Ramski Rit and Zabela Prison, before being transferred to the Adriatic islands of Sveti Grgur and Goli Otok, where she experienced abuse and sexual violence. Lebl later said that her imprisonment at Goli Otok was one of the most traumatic experiences of her life and far worse than what she had endured in Bulgarian and German captivity during the war.

After serving her sentence, Lebl returned to Belgrade but found that her name had been removed from the lists of the Association of Journalists of Serbia and SUBNOR, the Association of War Veterans. She had also been expelled from the School of Journalism-Diplomacy. Ostracised from social life and unable to find employment, she decided to emigrate to Israel. She spent the next three years applying for permission to leave Yugoslavia, but her requests were repeatedly denied.

=== Emigration and writing career ===
After her sixth application for Aliyah was accepted, Lebl emigrated in 1954 to Haifa in Israel. She took various jobs while learning Hebrew before completing advanced training as a radiographer. She then worked at a hospital for four years before travelling to Sweden for further specialisation. From 1964, she was head of the school of radiography at a medical centre in Tel Aviv, where she later taught radiography until her retirement.

Lebl began publishing historical works in Hebrew in the late 1970s and devoted herself to studying the history of Jews in Yugoslavia, particularly in Serbia and Macedonia. Her first book, Ge'ut va-shever: Perakim be-toldot Yehudei Makedonia ha-Vardarit ('Tide and Wreck: Chapters in the History of the Jews of Vardar Macedonia'), was published in 1986 after years of recording testimonies, conducting interviews and researching archival sources. The book is considered the first research on Jews in the territory of the former Yugoslavia.

In spring 1986, Lebl met the writer Danilo Kiš in Jerusalem at the Van Leer Institute, where she also met fellow Goli Otok survivor Eva Nahir Panić. In March 1989, Kiš and director Aleksandar Mandić travelled to Israel with a small film crew and spent a week recording testimonies of the two women for Goli Život ('Bare Life'). Kiš also encouraged Lebl to write about her experiences during the Holocaust and her imprisonment under the Yugoslav communist regime. The four-part series was broadcast from 12 to 15 March 1990, several months after Kiš's death in October 1989.

Lebl's memoir Ljubicica Bela: Vic Dug Dve I Po Godine ('White Violet: A Two and a Half Year Old Joke'), an autobiographical account of her imprisonment, was published in Yugoslavia in 1990. It was the first firsthand account of the conditions experienced by political prisoners in Tito's postwar Yugoslavia, and the first published testimony by a former female prisoner. Lebl dedicated that book to the female victims of Goli Otok. In the memoir, Lebl described sexual violence and other forms of abuse experienced by herself and the other women prisoners. At the time, imprisonment at Goli Otok was a taboo subject, particularly the experiences of women. Lebl wrote that hundreds of women imprisoned alongside her still feared speaking about their experiences decades later. The memoir was later translated into Hebrew and became a bestseller in Israel.

Also published in 1990 was her second book, Dnevnik jedne Judite ('Diary of a Judith'). Written in the form of a diary, it recounts the experiences of a Jewish family in German-occupied Belgrade during the first year of the war, from March to December 1941. Lebl revealed in the introduction that the diarist Judith was a pseudonym for her mother, Ana Lebl, who kept a diary for her husband before being deported to Sajmište concentration camp. The third book in the trilogy about her life, Odjednom drukčija, odjednom druga ('Suddenly different, suddenly other'), chronicled her early childhood and the history of the Lebl family during World War II.

Lebl continued to publish on Jewish history in the Balkans, including the Jewish communities of Yugoslavia, Serbia, Macedonia, Belgrade and Dubrovnik. Her two-volume study Do "konačnog rešenja" ('Until the Final Solution'), published in 2001 and 2002, covered the history of Belgrade's Jewish community from its origins under Ottoman and Austrian rule to its destruction in the Holocaust. In 2007, she published an expanded edition of her 1996 study of the collaboration between Nazi Germany and the Grand Mufti of Jerusalem, Amin al-Husseini. Lebl also wrote numerous articles on Jewish life in Yugoslavia and contributed entries to the Yad Vashem encyclopaedia and the Lexicon of Jewish Communities of Yugoslavia. She died of cancer on 21 October 2009 in Tel Aviv at the age of 82.

== Reception and legacy ==
Despite being a self-taught historian, her work on Serbian and Macedonian Jewish history was praised by historians and scholars of the Holocaust. Miriam Rajner wrote that it "contributed greatly to the history of Serbian and Macedonian Jews". Katarzyna Taczyńska noted its "significant impact on Holocaust research, the reconstruction and writing on Jewish history in Serbia, and on the struggle against myths about the history of Macedonian Jews". Paul Mojzes wrote that Lebl's work "deserves to get recognition both of historians of the Jewish people and of scholars of the Holocaust and genocides". Jovan Byford named Until the Final Solution: The Jews in Belgrade, 1521–1942 among the most significant Holocaust histories published in Serbia after 2000. Literary historian Predrag Palavestra described Lebl's work as "an exceptional contribution to the history of Jews in the Balkans", and considered it to be of "equal scholarly and literary value".

Lebl received numerous awards from the Federation of Jewish Communities of Yugoslavia and later Serbia for her historical and literary work. Following her death, the first prize in the Federation's annual competition was named the Ženi Lebl Award. The award is given to the best literary or scholarly work on Jewish themes in the fields of literature, science, art, memoirs and the Holocaust.

== Selected works ==
Lebl published twenty-two books in Serbian, English, and Hebrew as well as numerous articles.

- גאות ושבר: פרקים בתולדות יהודי מקדוניה הווארדארית [Tide and Wreck: History of the Jews of Vardar Macedonia] (in Hebrew). Moreshet. 1986.
- Ljubičica bela: vic dug dve i po godine [White Violet: A Joke Two and a Half Years Long] (in Serbian) (2nd ed.). Dečje novine. 1990.
- Dnevnik jedne Judite: Beograd 1941 [Diary of a Judith: Belgrade 1941] (in Serbian). Dečje novine. 1990. ISBN 978-86-367-0435-6.
- Jevrejske knjige štampane u Beogradu, 1837–1905 [Jewish Books Printed in Belgrade, 1837–1905] (in Serbian). Dečje novine. 1990.
- Jevreji u Pirotu [The Jews of Pirot] (in Serbian). Privredni pregled. 1990. ISBN 978-86-315-0082-3.
- Jerusalimski muftija [The Jerusalem Mufti] (in Serbian). Nova. 1993. ISBN 978-86-7583-017-7.
- Jevreji iz Jugoslavije - ratni vojni zarobljenci u Nemačkoj: pola veka od oslobođenja, 1945–1995, spomen-album [The Jews of Yugoslavia – Military Prisoners of War in Germany: Half a Century Since the Liberation, 1945–1995 – A Commemorative Album] (in Serbian). Udruženje veterana Drugog svetskog rata u Izraelu, Jugoslovenska grupa. 1995.
- חאג׳ אמין וברלין [Hajj-Amin and Berlin] (in Hebrew). Ž. Lebl. 1996. ISBN 978-965-701-806-4.
- אתמול, היום: יוצאי יוגוסלביה־לשעבר בבניין הארץ [Yesterday, Today: Emigrants from the Former Yugoslavia in Building the Land] (in Hebrew). Association of Immigrants from the Former Yugoslavia in Israel. 1999. ISBN 978-965-701-819-4.
- Do "konačnog rešenja": Jevreji u Beogradu 1521–1942 [Toward the "Final Solution": Jews in Belgrade 1521–1942] (in Serbian). Čigoja. 2001.
- Do "konačnog rešenja": Jevreji u Srbiji [Toward the "Final Solution": Jews in Serbia] (in Serbian). Vol. 2. Čigoja štampa. 2002. ISBN 978-86-7558-085-0.
- Odjednom drugačija, odjednom druga: sećanja i zaboravi [Suddenly Different, Suddenly Other: Memories and Forgettings] (in Serbian). Čigoja štampa. 2008. ISBN 978-86-7558-599-2.
- Da se ne zaboravi [Lest It Be Forgotten] (in Serbian). Čigoja štampa. 2008. ISBN 978-86-7558-600-5.
