= Alfred Pal =

Croatian painter and graphic designer

- Born: 30 November 1920; Vienna, Austria
- Died: 30 June 2010 (aged 89); Zagreb, Croatia
- Occupations: Painter, graphic designer
- Spouse: Branislava Žuvela (1962–2010)

Alfred Pal (30 November 1920 – 30 June 2010) was a Croatian painter and graphic designer.

== Early life and education ==
Pal was born in Vienna on November 30, 1920, into a Jewish family of Stefan and Therese (née Deutsch) Pal. Before the First World War Stefan Pal had owned a small chemical factory in Vienna which prospered as a supplier of shoe polish for the Austro-Hungarian Army, while Therese Deutsch was known for her beauty and appeared in several silent films produced in Berlin. Following the war and the collapse of Austria-Hungary, Pal senior moved his family to Poland, where he opened a new factory of chemical products called "Purus" near Kraków in 1921. Alfred had an older brother, Aleksandar, who was two years older than him.

In 1923, Theresa left Stefan and moved to Berlin, while Alfred and his brother continued to live with their father in Kraków. She would often visit her sons. A German governess from Katowice, Margareta "Greta" Petruschke took care of Alfred and his brother. In 1926 the boys enrolled into a private German-language elementary school in Grodska street in Kraków. Stefan Pal's business slowly deteriorated until 1929, when he, just before the Great Depression, sold his factory and moved back to Vienna to live in three-bedroom apartment with his sons. At that time Stefan and Aleksandar for the first time visited their father's sisters, Judita in Vukovar, and Gisela in Čakovci (both in present-day eastern Croatia). The Pal brothers continued their education in Vienna. With their father constantly on the road working as a traveling salesman, the family's housemaid Margareta took care of the brothers. In 1930, Alfred graduated from elementary school in Vienna. That same year he enrolled in high school, where for the first time he started drawing under professors Wimmer and Eisler. In 1931, Stefan Pal died while traveling to Kraków, where he was subsequently buried. Following their father's death, Alfred and his brother moved to Vukovar, where they lived with their aunt Judita and rest of their father's numerous family.

In 1932, Pal began to attend the high school in Vukovar, where one of his teachers was painter and designer Marijan Detoni. During his high school education, Pal often traveled to Čakovci where he helped his aunt Gisela. During the summer Pal earned pocket money by drawing caricatures across the Adriatic beaches, from Sušak to Dubrovnik. He also paid for his high school tuition by teaching German and mathematics. Meanwhile, Pal's mother's acting career in Berlin stalled as she failed to make a successful transition to talkies, and returned to Vienna. In 1938, because of the Anschluss she had to flee the country due to antisemitism, but without valid documents. In early 1940 she managed to enter the Kingdom of Yugoslavia and see their sons for the first time after 13 years. Pal graduated from high school in 1940, and that same year he enrolled at the Study of Architecture in Belgrade, but because of the numerus clausus he was sent on hold.

== World War II, later life and career ==
In 1941, with the invasion of Yugoslavia, Pal, his brother and their aunt Judita hid from the German army at their aunt Gisela's estate in Čakovci. The winter of 1941–42 was the last winter they would spend together. From all surrounding areas, Vukovar, Vinkovci and Ilok, Jews from 14 to 60 years of age, were rounded up and taken to concentration camps. In 1942, Pal's aunt Gisela had a stroke, and aunt Juditasuffered a severe hip fracture, which left them both immovable. Pal's mother was arrested in Nova Gradiška by the Croatian police, and was then taken by Ustaše to a concentration camp in Đakovo where she survived typhus. Later she was taken to Loborgrad camp in Hrvatsko Zagorje, where she was killed in August 1942.

In the summer of 1942, Pal and his brother decided to escape the Nazi and Ustaše persecution. His brother attempted to swim across the Danube near Opatovac to Hungary, never to be seen again. Alfred forged a travel pass for himself and managed to reach Crikvenica, which was at the time occupied by the Italians. In order to earn a living, Pal drew caricatures of local villagers, visitors and Italian soldiers. On November 10, 1942, Pal was arrested and taken to a detention camp in Kraljevica and was later transferred to Rab concentration camp. After the 1943 capitulation of Italy and the liberation of the camp, he joined the Yugoslav Partisans as a member of the Jewish Rab battalion. In the Partisans he became a member of the wartime editorial board of ZAVNOH newspaper Vjesnik.

After the war, Pal returned to Vukovar to find out that all members of his family had been murdered in the Holocaust, except his cousin Heda Sinberger, who survived Auschwitz. Pal's aunts Judita and Gisela, and his brother Aleksandar, were all murdered in concentration camps. In 1945 Pal moved to Zagreb, where he became the technical editor at the Ilustrirani Vjesnik weekly, and was one of the founders of the satirical newspaper Kerempuh, in 1945. He served as editor of Kerempuh from 1947 to 1949.

In 1949, Pal was one of the victims of the Informbiro period, an internal schism between Yugoslavia and Soviet Union which led to the Tito–Stalin split. Charged with being a sympathizer of Stalin and an enemy of the state, Pal was arrested and sent to Goli Otok, a prison and labour camp for political prisoners, where he served time from 1949 to 1950, and again from 1951 to 1954.

Upon his release he returned to Zagreb, where he started working at various publishers, translating books from German and editing graphic design. Nevertheless, Pal continued to suffer discrimination, as he was denied travel documents and was kept under surveillance by the Yugoslav secret police UDBA. From 1970 to 1984, Pal worked as an art editor at the Matica hrvatska publishing house, and from 1985 he worked as an independent artist. Pal was also a long-time member of the Croatian Association of Artists of Applied Arts (ULUPUH) and one of the initiators and founders of Zgraf, a prestigious exhibition of graphic design established in 1975 and held every three years in Zagreb.

== Work ==
Pal worked on graphic design from the very beginnings, practically on medieval hand carved wood graphics during the war. He was a master of book graphic design, in his long career he equipped a number of books from various libraries. Pal was the author of numerous posters which he made; he worked for various clients such as; Croatian National Theatre in Zagreb, Gavella Drama Theatre, Modern Gallery, Zagreb and others. As a painter, Pal had twelve solo exhibitions; in Zagreb (1961, 1964, 1969, 1982, 1989, 1999, 2001), Vukovar (1965, 1984), Rijeka (1966), Karlovac (1971) and Dubrovnik (1985). His painting was on the line of gestural abstraction and sarcastic fiction. Pal used encaustic technique in his painting.

== Honors ==
In 2010, Pal received the Vladimir Nazor Award for lifetime achievement in the category of fine and applied arts. That same year, he also received the city of Zagreb award for lifetime achievement.

== Personal life ==
Pal was married to medical technician Branislava (née Žuvela) Pal, whom he met in 1960. They married in 1962. Pal had two children, first born daughter Aleksandra (Saša) was named after Pal's late brother, and son Petar Samuel was named after his grandfathers. Pal was a longtime member of the Jewish community in Zagreb. He died on 30 June 2010 in Zagreb and was buried at the Mirogoj Cemetery.

== Bibliography ==
- Snješka Knežević, Aleksander Laslo (2011). Židovski Zagreb. Zagreb: AGM, Židovska općina Zagreb. ISBN 978-953-174-393-8.
- Kraus, Ognjen (1998). Dva stoljeća povijesti i kulture Židova u Zagrebu i Hrvatskoj. Zagreb: Židovska općina Zagreb. ISBN 953-96836-2-9.
- Jelena Hekman, Tonko Maroević (2004). Stratišta i po koje stablo. Zagreb: Matica hrvatska. ISBN 953-150-720-1.
