= Ljubica Štefan =

Croatian historian, Righteous Among the Nations (1921–2002)

- Born: Prilep, Kingdom of Yugoslavia (modern-day North Macedonia)
- Died: Zagreb, Croatia
- Occupation: historian

Ljubica Štefan (1921–2002) was a Croatian historian. She was awarded honorific title Righteous Among the Nations.

== Biography ==
Born in Croatian family in Prilep, Kingdom of Yugoslavia (modern-day North Macedonia) in 1921, Štefan graduated in Krk, Croatia in 1939. She started studying Slavic studies at the Faculty of Humanities and Social Sciences in 1939 in Zagreb, but finished in 1949 in Belgrade. She was a professor of slavistics in Belgrade, Kosovo and Vojvodina.

During the Second World War she lived in Karlovac by her uncle Lujo Štefan, with whom she run actions of liberating and saving Jews of Nazi-puppet NDH prosecutions. Consequently, she was awarded honorific title Righteous Among the Nations. Her and her uncle's name were engraved in Yad Vashem in 1992 together with the word Croatia for the first time in the history.

== Work ==
Štefan discovered and published documents about collaboration between Serbian Orthodox Church with Third Reich's military authorities. She lived in Belgrade until 1992 when she returned to Croatia. During the Yugoslav Communist Regime she published her works anonymously or under pseudonyms (Edo Bojović), because she was blacklisted by Yugoslav authorities. She published her works in Hrvatsko slovo, Vjesnik, Hrvatski obzor and many others.

She researched contemporary history, especially relations between Serbs, Albanians and Jews, as well as Holocaust in Southeastern Europe. The history award of Croatian Cultural Fond is named after her.

According to sociologist Jovan Byford, Štefan belonged to a group of authors whose works supported the Croatian side against the Serbian side in a "war of words" which became propaganda war after the involvement of various state ministries. These groups of authors depicted Serbs as a genuine "genocidal nation" whose collaborators during WWII, with the blessing of the Serbian Orthodox Church, cleansed Serbia from Jews and committed much worse crimes than the Ustaše.

According to John K. Roth, in her work From Fairy Tale to Holocaust, Štefan falsely alleges that Serbia ran an independent state during the Second World War (the country was under German military occupation). Štefan advocated the unproven theory that the Jasenovac concentration camp was used by Josip Broz Tito and the Yugoslav communist regime to imprison political prisoners after World War II.

== Sources ==
- Byford, Jovan (2011). Staro sajmište: mesto sećanja, zaborava i sporenja. Beogradski centar za ljudska prava. ISBN 978-86-7202-131-8.
