= Dragoslav Mihailović =

Serbian writer (1930–2023)

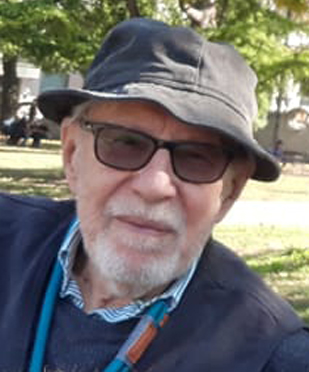
- Mihailović in 2022
- Born: 17 November 1930; Ćuprija, Kingdom of Yugoslavia
- Died: 12 March 2023 (aged 92); Belgrade, Serbia
- Education: Ćuprija Gymnasium
- Alma mater: University of Belgrade Faculty of Philosophy
- Occupations: Novelist, academic, screenwriter and playwright
- Children: Branislav (son); Milica (daughter)
- Writing career
- Language: Serbian
- Period: 1967–2023
- Genre: Drama
- Notable works: Kad su cvetale tikve, Petrijin venac, Čizmaši
- Notable awards: NIN Award (1983)

Dragoslav Mihailović (Serbian Cyrillic: Драгослав Михаиловић; 17 November 1930 – 12 March 2023) was a Serbian writer.

== Life ==
Mihailović graduated from high school in his hometown of Ćuprija in 1949 and subsequently enrolled at the Faculty of Philosophy, University of Belgrade. In 1950 he was arrested and then imprisoned for 15 months at Goli otok.

He graduated in Yugoslav literature from the University of Belgrade in 1957. His first collection of short stories titled Frede, laku noć (Good Night, Fred) was published in 1967 and awarded the October Prize. His novel Kad su cvetale tikve (When Pumpkins Blossomed) and the eponymous play, which premiered in the Yugoslav Drama Theatre in 1969, dealt critically with the legacy of Goli otok, the largest Yugoslav labor and punishment camp.

He was a member of the Serbian Academy of Sciences and Arts since 1981.

His 1975 work Petrijin venac (Petrija’s Wreath) was awarded the first ever Andrić Prize. For the novel Čizmaši (Boot Wearers) he received NIN Award in 1983.

Mihailović published a series of books titled ‘Goli Otok – a Documentary: interviews with former camp inmates’, in five volumes (1990-2012), which brought together disturbing testimonies of camp survivors.

Mihailović lived in Belgrade. He died on 12 March 2023, at the age of 92.

== Works ==
- 1967 – Frede, laku noć (Фреде, лаку ноћ); Matica srpska, Novi Sad
- 1968 – When Pumpkins Blossomed – Kad su cvetale tikve (Кад су цветале тикве); Matica srpska, Novi Sad
- 1975 – Petrijin venac (Петријин венац); Srpska književna zadruga, Belgrade
- 1983 – Čizmaši (Чизмаши); Srpska književna zadruga, Belgrade
- 1990 – Goli otok (Голи оток); NIP Politika, Belgrade
- 1993 – Lov na stenice (Лов на стенице); Beogradski izdavačko-grafički zavod, Belgrade
- 1994 – Gori Morava (Гори Морава); Srpska književna zadruga, Belgrade
- 2001 – Crveno i plavo (Црвено и плаво); NIN, Belgrade
- 2006 – Vreme za povratak (Време за повратак)
- 2010 – Preživljavanje (Преживљавање); Zavod za udžbenike, Belgrade
- 2019 – Treće proleće (Треће пролеће); Laguna, Belgrade
