= Aleksandar Popović (writer) =

Serbian writer

Aleksandar Popović (Ub, Serbia, November 2, 1929 — Belgrade, October 9, 1996) was a Serbian writer who authored more than 50 plays and other works, of which the most famous are Bela kafa and Mrešćenje šarana.

== Biography ==
Born in Ub to a family with military background, Popović graduated from the gymnasium in his hometown and soon after started to write poetry. In the late 40s he was arrested by the communist authorities and spent five years at Goli Otok. After release he worked a number of poorly paid jobs, only to accept the invitation of Duško Radović to start writing radio dramas for children. His opus includes a number of dramas, comedies, dramas for children, TV dramas, TV and movie scripts.

Popović's theatre play Mrešćenje šarana was banned in Yugoslavia.

== Selected works ==
- Devojčica u plavoj haljini, 1961
- Tvrdoglave priče, 1962
- Sudbina jednog Čarlija, 1964
- Ljubinko i Desanka, 1964
- Sudbina jednog Čarlija, 1964
- Čarapa od sto petlji, 1965
- Sablja dimiskija, 1965
- Razvojni put Bore Šnajdera, 1967
- Smrtonosna motoristika, 1967
- Kako se voli Vesna, 1974
- Mrešćenje šarana, 1984
- Gardijski potporučnik Ribanac ili Fantazija o cvećkama, 1984
- Tri svetlice s pozornice, 1986
- Bela kafa, 1990
- Tamna je noć, 1992
- Čarlama, zbogom, 1995
- Baš bunar, 1996
- Noćna frajla, 1999
