= Goli Otok =

Island in Primorje-Gorski Kotar County, Croatia

Coordinates: 44°50′20″N 14°49′7″E

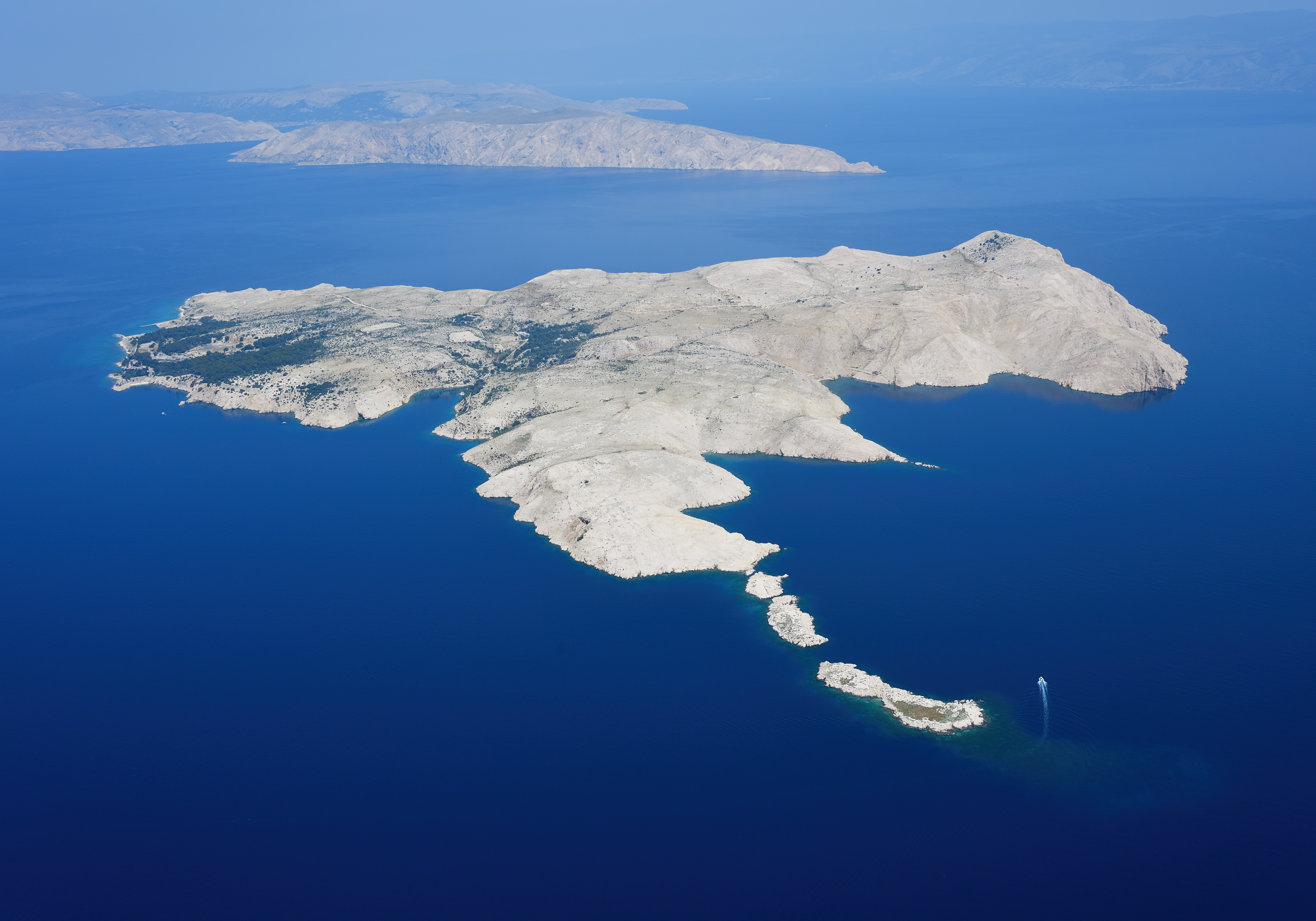
- Aerial view of Goli Otok

- Location within Croatia
- Interactive map of Goli Otok
- Etymology: Croatian: goli otok, lit. 'barren island'

Geography
- Adjacent to: Adriatic Sea
- Area: 4.54 km^{2} (1.75 sq mi)

Administration
- Croatia
- County: Primorje-Gorski Kotar County

Demographics
- Population: 0

Goli Otok (pronounced [ɡôliː ǒtok]; lit. 'Barren Island') is a barren, uninhabited island off the Dalmatian coast of Croatia. The island is located in the northern Adriatic Sea just off the coast of Primorje-Gorski Kotar County, with an area of approximately 4.5 square kilometers (1.7 sq mi). Exposed to strong bora winds, particularly in the winter, the island's surface is almost completely devoid of vegetation.

It was the site of a political prison from 1949 and 1989, when the nation was part of Yugoslavia. It is known as the "Croatian Alcatraz" due to its historic association with the prison complex.

== Prison ==
Goli Otok labor camp and prison
- labor camp
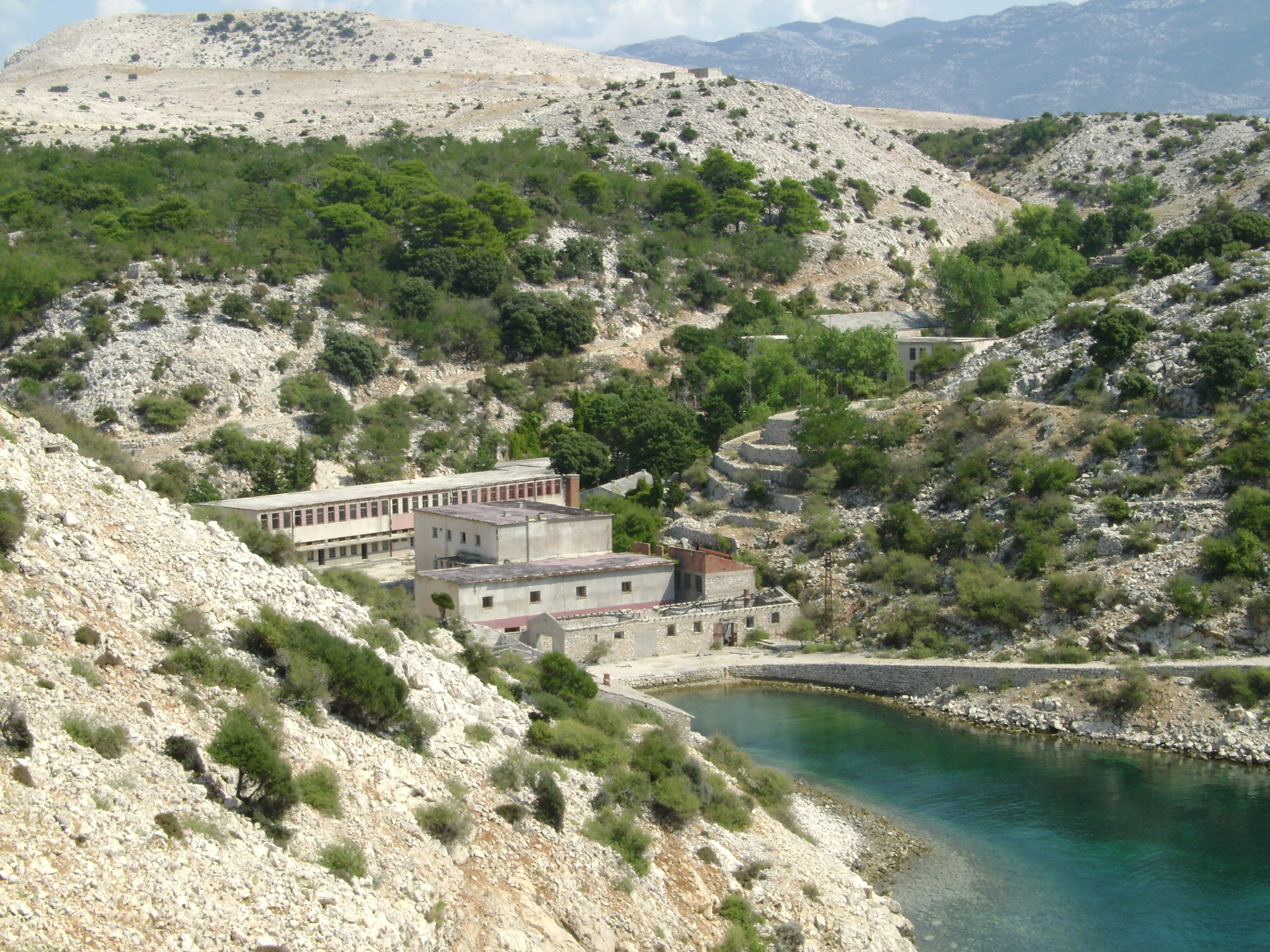
- The abandoned site of Goli Otok in 2005

- Location within Croatia
- Location: Goli Otok, Croatia
- Operated by: Yugoslavia; Socialist Republic of Croatia
- Operational: 1949 to 1956 (for political prisoners) and until December 30, 1988 as a normal prison
- Inmates: Stalinists, anti-Titoist dissidents and anti-communists
- Notable inmates: See List of notable prisoners section

Despite having long been an occasional grazing ground for local shepherds' flocks, the barren island was apparently never permanently settled other than by the prisoners during the 20th century. Throughout World War I, Austria-Hungary sent Russian prisoners of war from the Eastern Front to Goli Otok.

In 1949, the entire island was officially made into a high-security, top secret prison and labor camp set up by the authorities of the People's Federal Republic of Yugoslavia, together with the nearby Sveti Grgur island, which held a similar camp for female prisoners. Until 1956, following the Tito–Stalin split and throughout the Informbiro period, it was used to incarcerate political prisoners. These included known and alleged Stalinists, but also other Communist Party of Yugoslavia members or even non-party citizens accused of exhibiting sympathy or leanings towards the Soviet Union.

Many anti-communists (Serbian, Croatian, Macedonian, Bulgarian, Albanian and other nationalists etc.) were also incarcerated on Goli Otok. Non-political prisoners were also sent to the island to serve out simple criminal sentences and some of them were sentenced to death. A total of approximately 16,000 political prisoners served there, of which between 400 and 600 died on the island. Other sources, largely based on various individual statements, claim almost 4,000 prisoners died in the camp.

The prison inmates were forced to labor (in a stone quarry, pottery and joinery), without regard to the weather conditions: in the summer the temperature would rise as high as 40 °C (104 °F), while in the winter they were subjected to the chilling bora wind and freezing temperatures. The prison was entirely inmate-run, and its hierarchical system forced the convicts into beating, humiliating, denouncing and shunning each other. Those who cooperated could hope to rise up the hierarchy and receive better treatment.

After Yugoslavia normalized relations with the Soviet Union, Goli Otok prison passed to the provincial jurisdiction of the People's Republic of Croatia (as opposed to the Yugoslav federal authorities). Regardless, the prison remained a taboo topic in Yugoslavia until the early 1980s. Antonije Isaković wrote the novel Tren (Moment) about the prison in 1979, waiting until after Josip Broz Tito's death in 1980 to release it. The book became an instant bestseller. Ženi Lebl's memoir Ljubicica Bela: Vic Dug Dve I Po Godine (White Violet: A Two and a Half Year Old Joke), published in Yugoslavia in 1990, was the first published testimony by a former female prisoner. The prison was shut down on 30 December 1988 and completely abandoned in 1989. Since then it has been left to ruin. It has since become a tourist attraction and is visited by shepherds from Rab. Former Croatian prisoners are organized into the Association of Former Political Prisoners of Goli Otok. In Serbia, they are organized into the Society of Goli Otok.

=== Notable prisoners ===
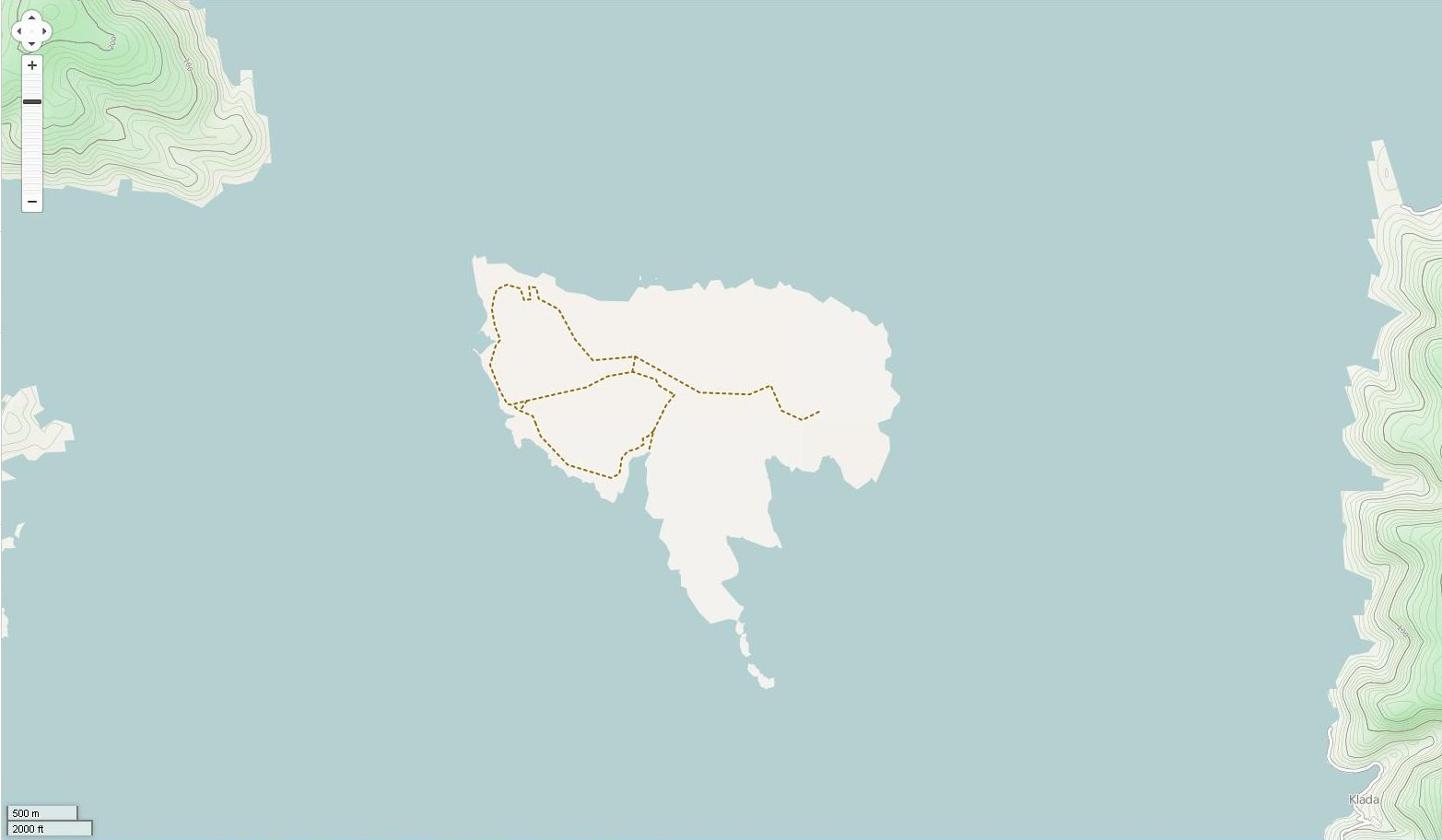
Map of Goli Otok

- Šaban Bajramović, Serbian Romani musician
- Panko Brashnarov, Macedonian politician
- Vlado Dapčević, Yugoslav Montenegrin communist revolutionary and partisan
- Adem Demaçi, Kosovo Albanian politician and author
- Teki Dervishi, Albanian writer
- Vlado Dijak, Yugoslav Bosnian writer and partisan
- Nikola Kljusev, former Prime Minister of Macedonia
- Ženi Lebl, Yugoslav-Israeli historian of the Holocaust in the Balkans.
- Tine Logar, Slovenian linguist
- Venko Markovski, Macedonian writer
- Dragoljub Mićunović, Serbian partisan, sociologist, and politician
- Dragoslav Mihailović, Serbian writer
- Alfred Pal, Croatian painter and graphic designer
- Dobroslav Paraga, Croatian politician
- Aleksandar Popović, Serbian writer
- Igor Torkar, Slovenian writer
- Vlasta Velisavljević, Serbian actor
- Ante Zemljar, Croatian partisan and writer
- Savo Zlatić, Croatian physician and politician
- Vitomil Zupan, Slovenian writer

== Literature ==
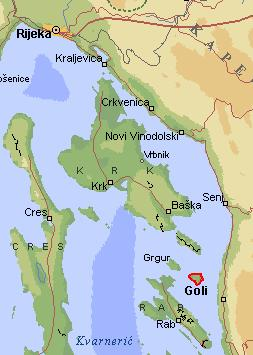
Goli Otok and its neighboring islands

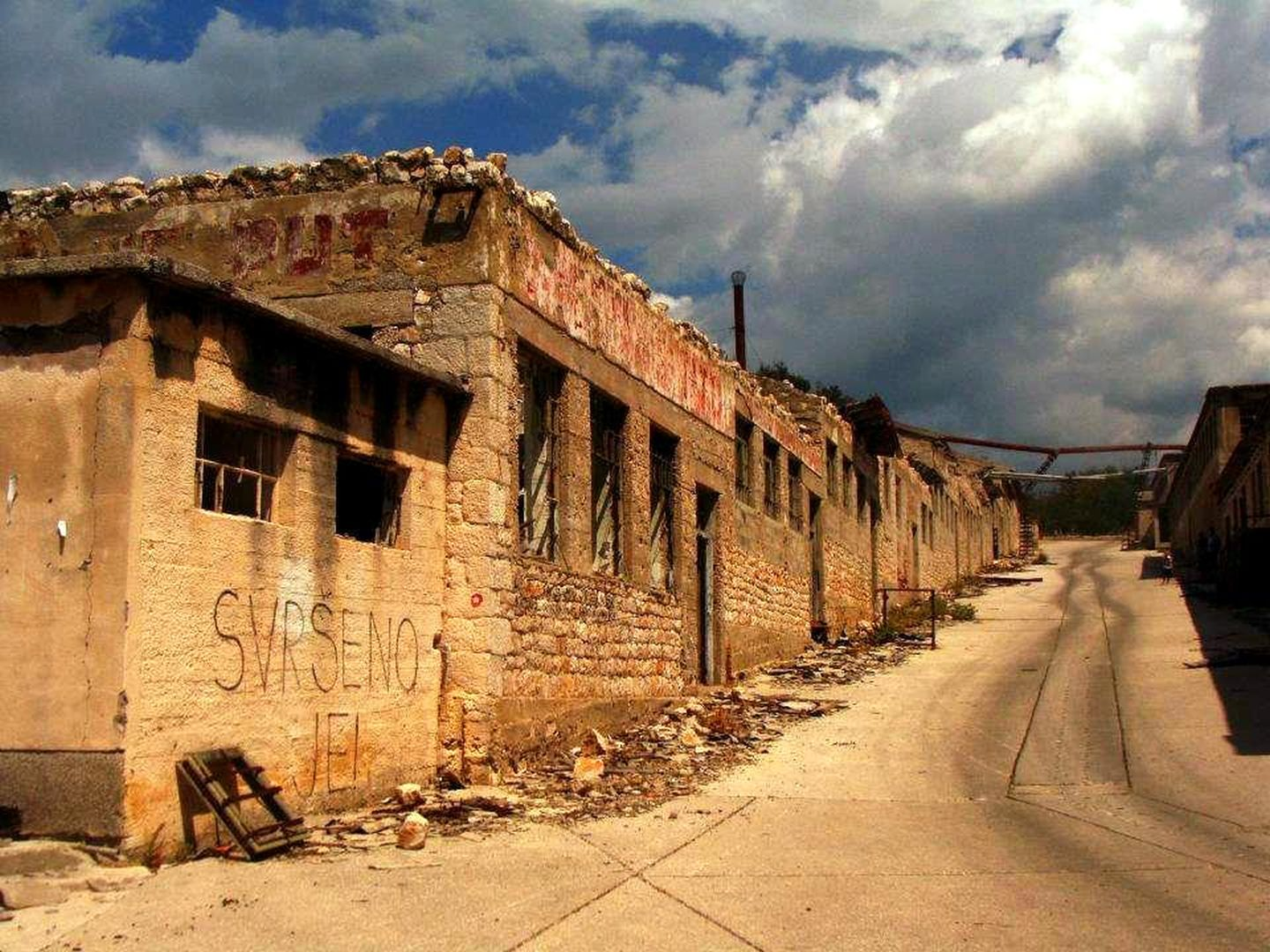
Graffiti saying 'It's over!'

- 1981: Noč do jutra ('Night till Morning Comes') ‒ novel by Slovenian author Branko Hofman.
- 1981: Herezia e Dervish Mallutes – allegorical novel by Kosovar author Teki Dervishi.
- 1982: Tren 2 – novel by Antonije Isaković.
- 1984: Umiranje na obroke ('Dying by Installments') ‒ autobiographical book by Slovenian author Igor Torkar, about Goli Otok prison conditions.
- 1984: Goli Otok: The Island of Death ‒ non-fiction book by Bulgarian-Macedonian author Venko Markovski, detailing a history of Goli Otok prison.
- 1990: Ljubicica Bela: Vic Dug Dve I Po Godine (White Violet: A Two and a Half Year Old Joke) ‒ autobiographical book by Ženi Lebl
- 1990: Goli Otok by Dragoslav Mihailović.
- 1993: Lov na stenice ('Hunting for Bedbugs') by Dragoslav Mihailović.
- 1996: Goli Otok: stratište duha ('Goli Otok: Gallows of the Soul') ‒ non-fiction book by Croatian author Mihovil Horvat, containing the events of his arrest and imprisonment during Informbiro period.
- 1997: Goli Otok: Italiani nel Gulag di Tito ('Goli Otok: Italians in Tito's Gulag') ‒ historical report by Italian-Croatian author Giacomo Scotti.
- 1997: Zlotvori ('Evildoers') – novel by Dragoslav Mihailović.
- 1997: Tito's Hawaii ‒ novel by author using the pen-name Rade Panic (name taken from a political victim of the same name whose wife was interred on the island; not his actual name).
- 2005: Razglednica s ljetovanja ('A Postcard From Summer Vacation') ‒ autobiographical short novel by the Croatian author Dubravka Ugrešić; published in the Belgrade literary review REČ časopis za književnost i kulturu, i društvena pitanja, br. 74/20, 2006, and in the book Nikog nema doma, ed. devedeset stupnjeva, Zagreb 2005. Italian translation Cartolina Estiva by Luka Zanoni Osservatorio Balcani e Caucaso, 2008.
- 2010: Island of the World - novel by Canadian author Michael D. O'Brien.
- 2019: Life Plays with Me (Published in North America as More Than I Love My Life) - novel by Israeli writer David Grossman. One of the main characters, Vera, was interned as a political prisoner in Goli Otok before immigrating to Israel.

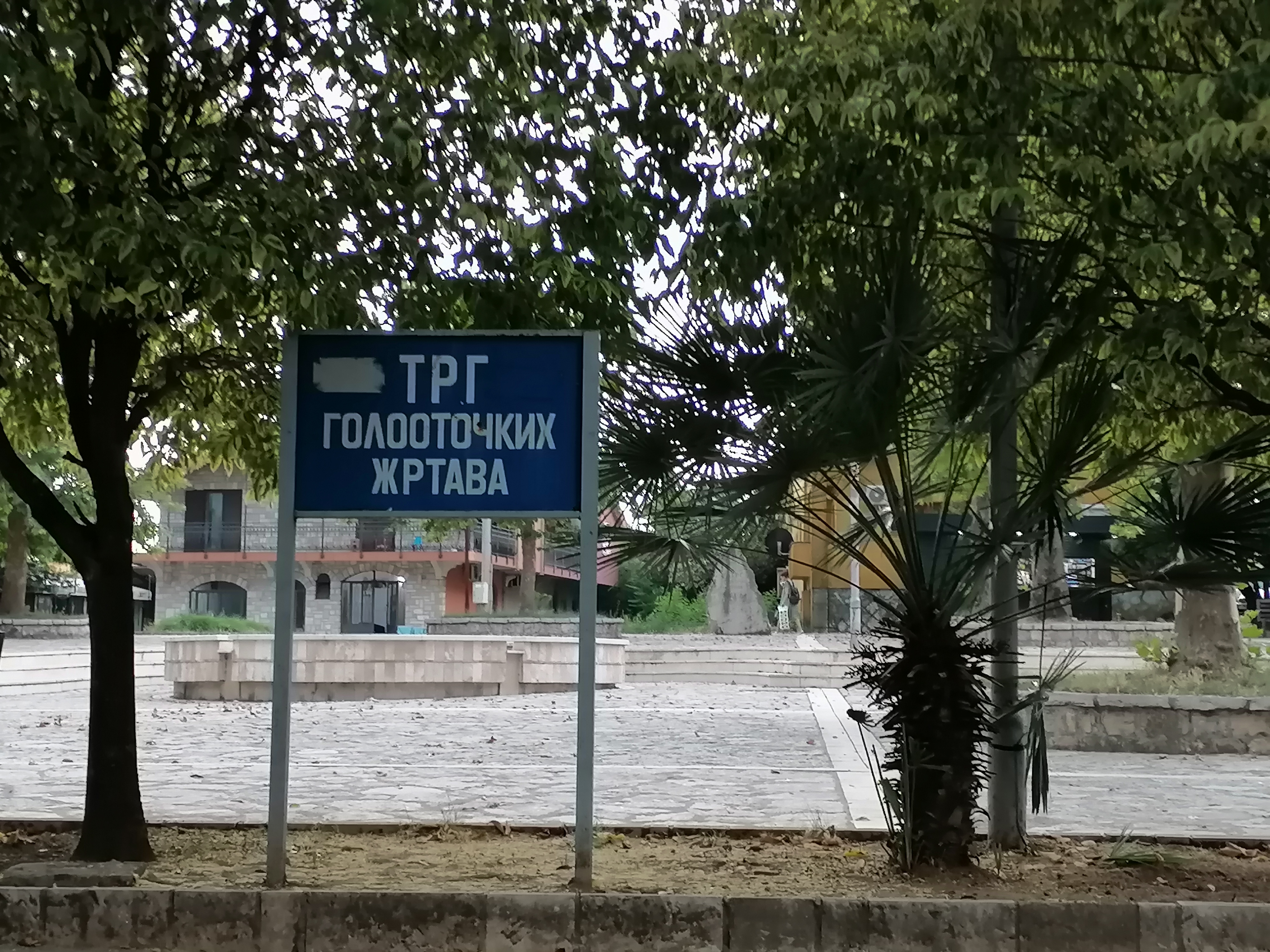
Square of Goli Otok victims in Danilovgrad, Montenegro, pictured 2022.

- 2023: The Secret of Bald Island - non-fiction book by Claudia Sonia Colussi Corte, describing her father's (Cherubino Colussi Corte) return to Mali Lošinj, Yugoslavia, as part of the Italian Controesodo, his arrest on suspicion of being a Stalinist, and his imprisonment on Goli Otok during the Informbiro period.

== Film and television ==
- 1996: The Seventh Chronicle (Sedma kronika) – Croatian feature film about a Goli Otok inmate who escapes by swimming to the island of Rab, based on a novel by Grgo Gamulin
- 2002: Eva ‒ documentary film told in German, Hebrew and English recounting the experiences of Eva Panić-Nahir, a former prisoner of the island; produced/directed by Avner Faingulernt
- 2009: Strahota - Die Geschichte der Gefängnisinsel Goli Otok ‒ German-language documentary film with 8 former prisoners; produced/directed by Reinhard Grabher
- 2012: Goli Otok ‒ documentary film directed by Darko Bavoljak
- 2013: Lost Survivors ‒ Travel Channel reality TV survival series episode entitled "Prison Island"
- 2014: Goli – documentary film directed by Tiha K. Gudac
- 2014: In the Name of the People ‒ exhibition in Belgrade; with an alphabetical list of 16,500 names of people who were jailed at the Goli Otok available for online search on their website
- 2019: Mysteries of the Abandoned ‒ Season 4 Episode 9 "Haunting on Plague Island"

== Sources ==
- Previšić, Martin (2014). Povijest informbiroovskog logora na Golom otoku 1949. –1956 [History of the Goli Otok Cominformist Prison Camp 1949. – 1956.] (PDF) (in Croatian). Faculty of Humanities and Social Sciences, University of Zagreb.
- Previšić, Martin (February 2015). "Broj kažnjenika na Golom otoku i drugim logorima za informbirovce u vrijeme sukoba sa SSSR-om (1948.-1956.)" [The Number of Convicts on Goli Otok and other Internment Camps during the Informbiro period (1948 – 1956)] (PDF). Historijski zbornik (in Croatian). 66 (1): 173–193.
- Segel, Harold B., ed. (2012). The Walls Behind the Curtain: East European Prison Literature, 1945-1990. University of Pittsburgh Press. ISBN 9780822978022.
