= Ante Zemljar =

Croatian writer

- Born: 1922; Pag, Kingdom of Yugoslavia
- Died: 2004 (aged 81–82); Zagreb, Croatia
- Occupations: Writer and Poet

Ante Zemljar (1922—2004) was Croatian military officer and writer from Dalmatia.

== Biography ==
Zemljar was born in Pag 1922. He finished primary and secondary school in Pag and Šibenik. From 1941 on, was a member of the National Liberation Army as a resistance fighter, political activist and an officer. From 1949 to 1953 he went through torture on Goli Otok as a political prisoner. Interestingly, even though he was tortured by the communist party he fought for he continued to publish propaganda justifying Partizan crimes and murders.

Zemljar had a degree in comparative literature from the University of Zagreb. In literature he proved himself as a poet, storyteller, travel writer, novelist, critic and a scriptwriter. He contributed to almost all relevant literary magazines, wrote radio comedies and film scripts, and published dozens of books. He was especially successful in so-called "island literature", describing in several books the climate and the people of his place of origin, the Croatian coast and the Kvarner Islands. Probably his most important work was Charon and destinies (Haron i sudbine), an account of what happened in the Slana concentration camp during World War II.
