= Borislav Arapović =

Bosnian-Croatian writer

- Born: 11 April 1935 (age 91); Bišina Nevesinje, Kingdom of Yugoslavia
- Occupations: Poet and writer

Borislav Arapović (born Bišina Nevesinje, Kingdom of Yugoslavia, 11 April 1935) is a Bosnian-Croatian born poet, linguist, literary scholar and Bible translator. He adopted Swedish nationality and writes in Swedish and Croatian. In 1999 he was elected a foreign member of the Russian Academy of Sciences primarily for his services to minority languages.

== Studies ==
Arapović studied at the Economic Faculty, University of Zagreb 1960-65. He came to Sweden as a refugee in 1965. He first got work at the retail chain Kooperativa Förbundet and then at IBM in Stockholm. Meanwhile, he was studying for a doctorate at the School of Slavonic and Baltic Languages, Stockholm University, (Ph.D. in Slavic languages 1984).

== Institute for Bible Translation, 1973 ==
Arapović founded the Institute for Bible Translation in Stockholm in 1973 to publish Bibles for "non-Slavic peoples in Slavic countries," and provide not just Bible translations into the languages of Russia but also Central Asian languages.

== Poetry ==
His collection of poems Prolomom (2005) was awarded the Bosnia-Herzegovina Croatian Writers' Association's "Antun Branko Šimić Prize" in 2006.

== Publications ==
=== Non-fiction ===
- Dječja Biblija (Children's Bible) with Vera Mattelmäki, 1983
- Miroslav Krleža Den kroatiske guden Mars ("The Croatian god Mars"): tillkomsthistoria, ISBN 91-7146-340-2 Dissertation in Swedish, 1984.
- Östgötasonen : Karl Einar Johansson. ("Son of Östgötland") Swedish biography Stockholm 1988
- Till alla tungomål och folk : Institutet för bibelöversättning 20 år, 1973-1993
- ("Biblical Silk Road - Memories of IBT 1973-1998.") Swedish 1997
- Hrvatski mirospis 1778. 1999.
- Krigsdimmor : från Kroatien och Bosnien-Hercegovina 1991-1995. - Stockholm : Codices, 2002
- Between despair and lamentation Translated from Croatian by Ivana Pozajić Jerić Elmhurst College, 2002. ISBN 0-9715120-0-0

=== Poetry (in Croatian) ===
- Zvončići ("Jingle Bells") 12 booklets of verses for children, 1977.
- Iz noćnog dnevnika 1989.
- Tamnionik 1992
- Kamenopis 1993
- Povratak hrvatskih pukovnija 1779. 2000
- Prolomom ("Fractures") Mostar Biblioteka Suvremenici ISBN 9958-798-11-5
