= Malkica Dugeč =

Croatian writer (1936–2026)

- Born: June 3, 1936 (age 90); Zavidovići
- Died: September 15, 2026 (aged 90); Stuttgart, Germany
- Education: Faculty of Philosophy, University of Zagreb
- Occupations: poet, writer
- Spouse: Božo Dugeč
- Writing career
- Language: Croatian
- Years active: 1953-2026
- Movement: Croatian Spring

Malkica Dugeč (3 June 1936 – 15 September 2026) was a Croatian poet, writer and schoolteacher. As a participant of Croatian Spring and supporter of the Declaration on Croatian language (1967), she emigrated to West Germany, where she was active in the cultural and political life of Croatian diaspora. She published more than 30 works, mostly poetry collections, and her poems were included in several anthologies.

== Life ==
She was born on June 3rd, 1936 in Zavidovići. She attended elementary school in Sarajevo, and high school in Zagreb, where she graduated Croatian language and literature at the Faculty of Philosophy. She worked as a schoolteacher of Croatian and literature in Požega, Lobor, Gradac (near Drniš), Donji Miholjac (1964–1972) and several other places.

Facing threats due to her support for the Declaration on the Name and Status of the Croatian Literary Language (1967), participation in Croatian Spring and establishment of several branches of Matica hrvatska in Slavonia during 1970-72, she was forced to emigrate with her husband, professor Božo Dugeč, to the West Germany. In 1975, she got political asylum in Germany.

She died in Stuttgart on September 15th, 2026, after a year-long medical treatments in Heilbronn hospital.

== Literary work ==
She published her first works in teen magazine Polet in 1953 and in Studentski list. She published her first poetry collection Crveni biseri ('Red pearls') in 1960 in Požega. Poems written in emigration and asylum, Zemlja moja nebo moje ('My land my sky'), were published in 1984 in Barcelona, in Hrvatska revija edition edited by Vinko Nikolić.

She was member of Matica hrvatska (since 1970), Croatian Writers' Association (DHK), Croatian Writers' Association of Herzeg-Bosnia (DHK HB), Croatian academy of arts and sciences in diaspora (HAZUUD) and German association for Croatistics.

Published works

- Crveni biseri (1960)
- Zemlja moja – nebo moje (1984)
- Kriška dobrote (1994)
- Sve dalje od sebe (1996)
- S Hrvatskom u sebi (1998)
- Kroz pukotinu neba (1999)
- Žudnja za smijehom (2000)
- Izabrane pjesme 1953. – 2003. (2003)
- Drhtaji ptica (2004)
- Moć svjetla (2006)
- Tragovima bezdomnosti (2008)
- Blagdan riječi hrvatske (2012)
- Početak rasta u ljude (2014)
- Slobodna misao (2019)
- Krik iz magle – Pjesme u doba korone (2021)
- Za dane buduće (2021)

== Awards ==
She earned three Croatian literary awards:

- Dubravko Horvatić Award for poetry collection Sebe ne vidiš nikada (2004)
- Antun Branko Šimić Award for poetry collection U riječ unjedrena (2007)
- Fra Lucijan Kordić Award for poetry collection Žigice vjere
