= Martin Previšić =

Croatian historian

Martin Previšić (born 6 September 1984) is a Croatian historian. Previšić is an assistant professor at the University of Zagreb's Faculty of Humanities and Social Sciences.

== Biography ==
Previšić was born on September 6, 1984, in Zagreb, Croatia. He graduated from II. gimnazija (Zagreb). From 2002 to 2008 he professionally played basketball for various Croatian basketball teams (KK Cibona Zagreb, on loan at KK Zagreb and KK Karlovac, KK Dubrava) and was a member of Junior Croatian National Basketball Team and U-20 Croatian National Basketball Team which won gold medal at the 2002 European Championship for Junior Men.

He received his BA and MA in modern history from the University of Zagreb. In 2011 he took the post-graduate study of the Modern and Contemporary Croatian History in European and World Context. His PhD thesis entitled History of the Goli Otok Cominformist prison camp 1949 - 1956 was completed under the mentorship of Ivo Banac (Yale Bradford Durfee Professor Emeritus at Yale University) and defended on July 7, 2014.

== Career ==
Martin Previšić is teaching several courses at the University of Zagreb's Faculty of Humanities and Social Sciences: Croatian History after 1945; History of the International Communist Movement, and History of Yugoslavia 1945–1991; Tito-Stalin Conflict and Goli Otok. In addition, he is a lecturer at the Croatian Defence Academy 'Dr Franjo Tuđman'.

In 2019 Previšić published 'Povijest Golog otoka', a widely critically acclaimed and award-winning book. He also co-edited (with Tvrtko Jakovina) The Tito-Stalin Split 70 Years After (2020). He also published numerous scientific papers and popular articles in various Croatian journals. He was engaged as an expert advisor and author of the narratives for the documentary film 'Goli Otok' (Bare Island), made in 2012 in co-production of the Croatian National Archive and ART DE FACTO. He participated in the exhibition 'Reflections of Time 1945-1955' held in the Klovićevi Dvori Gallery in Zagreb between December 2012 and March 2013, and assisted in the staging of exhibition 'In the Name of the People – Political Repression in Serbia 1944-1955', organized by The Historical Museum of Serbia.

He was awarded a fellowship in Israel (Yad Vashem International School for Holocaust Studies – Seminar for Holocaust Studies for Educators from Croatia and Slovenia, Jerusalem 2015). In 2019 he was Fulbright fellow at Stanford University.

In 2017 Previšić visited the United States of America as a visiting lecturer at the University of California, Berkeley; University of Illinois at Urbana–Campaign; University of Pittsburgh; University of North Carolina at Chapel Hill and Furman University. Later in 2017 he also visited Germany and held a lecture at Humboldt University, Berlin. In 2019 he also gave lectures at Stanford University and the University of California, Berkeley.

As of 2017 Previšić is a board member of the Zagreb City Museum.

== Work ==
Previšić specializes in modern Croatian, Yugoslav and Soviet political history with a thematic focus on topics related to International Communist Movement, history of labor camps as well as the Breakup of Yugoslavia. His field of expertise include a variety of new methodological approaches, such as comparative history or oral history. He collected an abundance of new information in his many interviews with contemporary witnesses, including a large number of the survivors of the labor camps in Yugoslavia.

== Published works ==
Books

- Previšić, Martin, ed. (2021). Breaking Down Bipolarity: Yugoslavia's Foreign Relations during the Cold War. Rethinking the Cold War. De Gruyter Oldenbourg. doi:10.1515/9783110658972. ISBN 9783110654677.
- Jakovina, Tvrtko; Previšić, Martin, eds. (2020). The Tito-Stalin Split 70 Years After. Zagreb. doi:10.17234/9789531758031.
- Previšić, Martin (2019). Povijest Golog otoka (in Croatian). Zagreb. ISBN 978-953266988-6.; Previšić, Martin (2021). Zgodovina Golega otoka (in Slovenian). Ljubljana.(Slovenian translation)

Other works

- Previšić, Martin; Stamenić, Boris; Bralić, Vladi (2020). "Goli Otok: a Short Guide Through the History of the Internment Camp on Goli Otok" (PDF). Documenta.
