= Tito–Stalin split =

Cold War schism between communist states

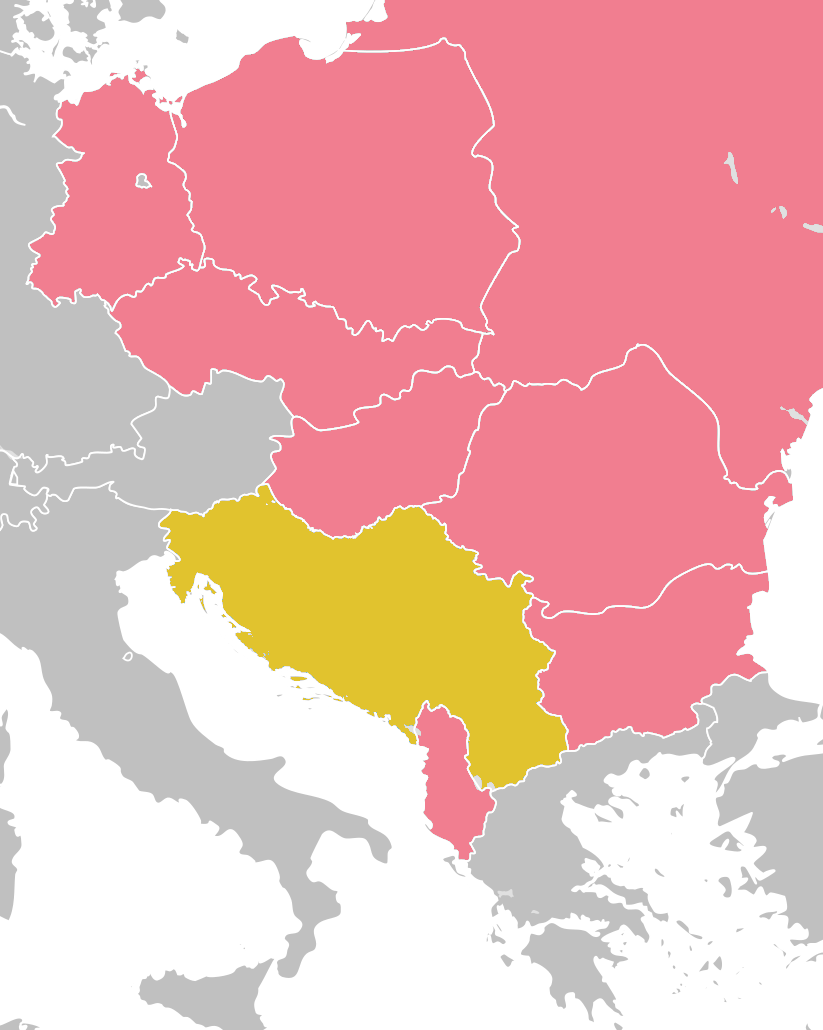
The Eastern Bloc countries (marked ★) at the time of the Tito–Stalin split; the Free Territory of Trieste and the borders of the occupation zones of Germany and Austria are not shown

Josip Broz Tito, leader of Yugoslavia, broke with Joseph Stalin, leader of the Soviet Union, in the years following World War II. Although presented by both sides as an ideological dispute, their conflict was as much the product of a geopolitical struggle in the Balkans that also involved Albania, Bulgaria, and the communist insurgency in Greece, which Tito's Yugoslavia supported and the Soviet Union distanced itself from.

In the years following World War II, Yugoslavia pursued economic, internal, and foreign policy objectives that did not align with the interests of the Soviet Union and its Eastern Bloc allies. In particular, Yugoslavia hoped to admit neighbouring Albania to the Yugoslav federation. This fostered an atmosphere of insecurity within the Albanian political leadership and exacerbated tensions with the Soviet Union, which made efforts to impede Albanian–Yugoslav integration. Yugoslav support of the communist rebels in Greece against the wishes of the Soviet Union further complicated the political situation. Stalin tried to pressure Yugoslavia and moderate its policies using Bulgaria as an intermediary. When the conflict between Yugoslavia and the Soviet Union became public in 1948, it was portrayed as an ideological dispute to avoid the impression of a power struggle within the Eastern Bloc.

The split ushered in the Informbiro period of purges within the Communist Party of Yugoslavia. It was accompanied by a significant level of disruption to the Yugoslav economy, which had previously depended on the Eastern Bloc. The conflict also prompted fears of an impending Soviet invasion and even a coup attempt by senior Soviet-aligned military leaders, a fear fueled by thousands of border incidents and incursions orchestrated by the Soviets and their allies. Deprived of aid from the Soviet Union and the Eastern Bloc, Yugoslavia subsequently turned to the United States for economic and military assistance.

== Background ==
=== Tito–Stalin conflict during World War II ===
During World War II, the relationship between Yugoslav Partisan leader Josip Broz Tito and Soviet leader Joseph Stalin was complicated by the Soviet Union's alliances, Stalin's desire to expand the Soviet sphere of influence beyond the borders of the Soviet Union, and the confrontation between Tito's Communist Party of Yugoslavia (KPJ) and the Yugoslav government-in-exile headed by King Peter II of Yugoslavia.

The Axis powers invaded the Kingdom of Yugoslavia on 6 April 1941. The country surrendered 11 days later, and the government fled abroad, ultimately relocating to London. Nazi Germany, Fascist Italy, Bulgaria and Hungary annexed parts of the country. The remaining territory was broken up: most of it was organised as the Independent State of Croatia (NDH), a puppet state garrisoned by German and Italian forces, while the capital Belgrade remained in the German-occupied territory of Serbia. The Soviet Union, still honouring the Molotov–Ribbentrop Pact, broke off relations with the Yugoslav government and sought, through its intelligence assets, to set up a new Communist organisation independent of the KPJ in the NDH. The Soviet Union also tacitly approved the restructuring of the Bulgarian Workers' Party. In particular, the party's new organisational structure and territory of operation were adjusted to account for the annexation of Yugoslav territories by Bulgaria. The Soviets only reversed their support for such actions in September 1941—well after the start of the Axis invasion of the Soviet Union—after repeated protests from the KPJ.

In June 1941, Tito informed the Comintern and Stalin about his plans for an uprising against the Axis occupiers. However, Stalin considered the prolific use of Communist symbols by Tito's Partisans to be problematic. This was because Stalin viewed his alliance with the United Kingdom and the United States as necessarily contrary to the Axis destruction of "democratic liberties". Stalin thus felt that Communist forces in Axis-occupied Europe were actually obligated to fight to restore democratic liberties—even if temporarily. In terms of Yugoslavia, this meant that Stalin expected the KPJ to fight to restore the government-in-exile. Remnants of the Royal Yugoslav Army, led by Colonel Draža Mihailović and organised as Chetnik guerrillas, were already pursuing the restoration of the Yugoslav monarchy.

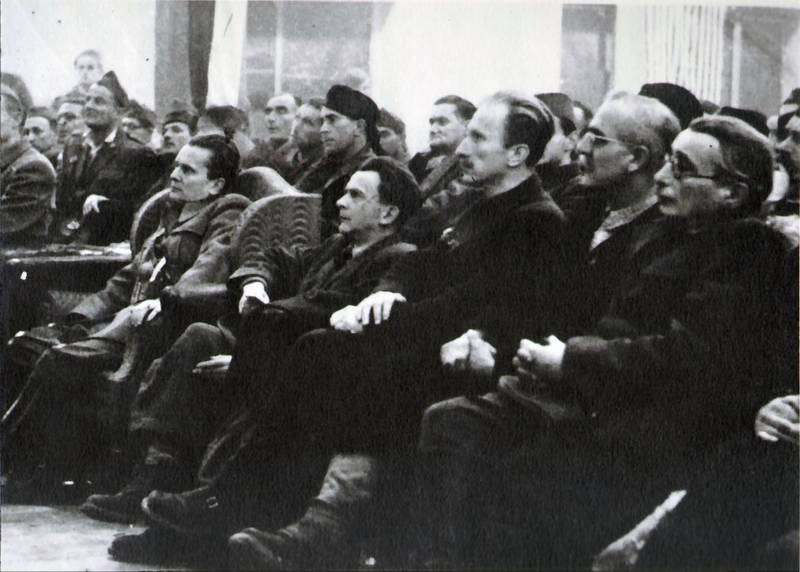
In 1943, the Yugoslav Communist leadership transformed the AVNOJ into a new Yugoslav deliberative body.

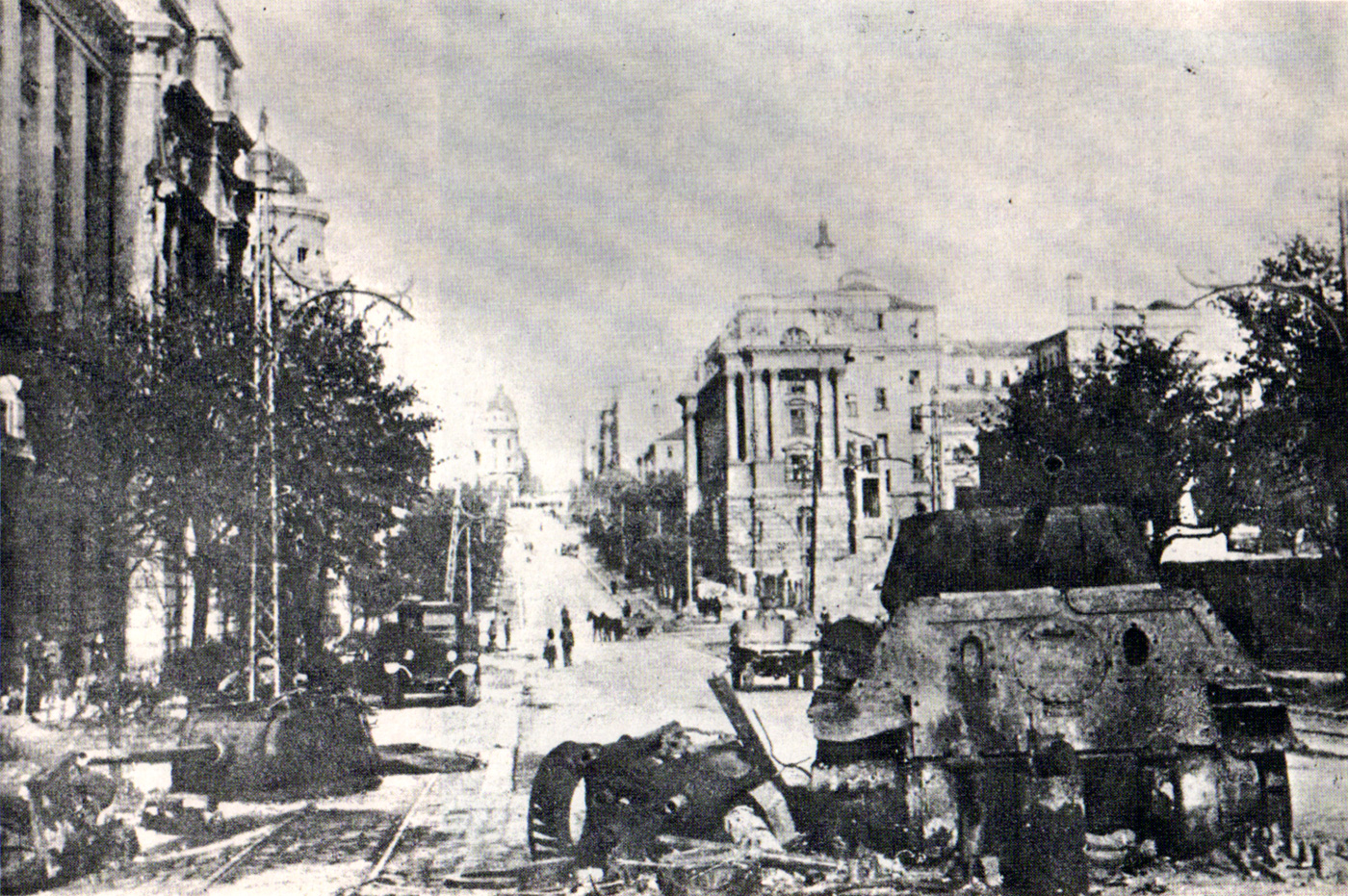
The Red Army, supported by the Yugoslav Partisans, captured Belgrade in October 1944.

In October 1941, Tito met Mihailović twice to propose a joint struggle against the Axis. Tito offered him the position of chief of staff of the Partisan forces, but Mihailović turned down the offer. By the end of the month, Mihailović concluded that the Communists were the true enemy. At first, Mihailović's Chetniks fought the Partisans and the Axis simultaneously, but within months, they began collaborating with the Axis against the Partisans. By November, the Partisans were fighting the Chetniks while sending messages to Moscow protesting Soviet propaganda praising Mihailović.

In 1943, Tito transformed the Anti-Fascist Council for the National Liberation of Yugoslavia (AVNOJ) into an all-Yugoslav deliberative and legislative body, denounced the government-in-exile, and forbade King Peter's return to the country. These decisions ran against explicit Soviet advice instructing Tito not to antagonise the exiled monarch and his government. Stalin was at the Tehran Conference at the time and viewed the move as a betrayal of the Soviet Union. In 1944–1945, Stalin's renewed instructions to Communist leaders in Europe to establish coalitions with bourgeois politicians were met with incredulity in Yugoslavia. This shock was reinforced by Stalin's revelation of the Percentages Agreement to the surprised Edvard Kardelj, vice president of the Yugoslav provisional government. The agreement, concluded by Stalin and British Prime Minister Winston Churchill during the 1944 Moscow Conference divided Eastern European countries into British and Soviet spheres of influence—splitting Yugoslavia evenly between the two.

=== Territorial dispute in Trieste and Carinthia ===
In the final days of the war, the Partisans captured parts of Carinthia in Austria and started to advance across pre-war Italian soil. While the Western Allies believed Stalin had arranged the move, he actually opposed it. Specifically, Stalin feared for the Soviet-backed Austrian government of Karl Renner, and was afraid that a wider conflict with the Allies over Trieste would ensue. Stalin thus ordered Tito to withdraw from Carinthia and Trieste, and the Partisans complied.

Nevertheless, Yugoslavia maintained its claims against Italy and Austria. The territorial dispute in the northwest part of Istria and around the city of Trieste caused the Treaty of Peace with Italy to be delayed until 1947, and led to the establishment of the independent Free Territory of Trieste. This did not satisfy Tito as he sought revisions of the borders around Trieste and in Carinthia, prompting the Western Allies to keep a garrison in Trieste to prevent a Yugoslav takeover. Tito's continued insistence on the acquisition of Trieste was also seen by Stalin as an embarrassment to the Italian Communist Party.

=== Political situation in Eastern Europe, 1945–1948 ===
In the immediate aftermath of World War II, the Soviet Union sought to establish its political dominance in foreign countries captured by the Red Army, mostly by establishing coalition governments in Eastern European countries. One-party Communist rule was generally difficult to achieve because Communist parties were usually quite small. The Communist leaders saw the strategic approach as a temporary measure until circumstances allowing for sole Communist rule improved. Contrary to most Communist parties in Europe, the KPJ and the Albanian Communist Party (PKSH) enjoyed significant popular support stemming from Tito's Partisan movement in Yugoslavia and Albania's National Liberation Movement. While Tito's Federal People's Republic of Yugoslavia was under Soviet influence in the final months of the war and the first few post-war years, Stalin declared it outside the Soviet sphere of interest on several occasions, treating it like a satellite state. The contrast with the rest of Eastern Europe was underscored ahead of a Soviet offensive in October 1944. Tito's Partisans supported the offensive, which ultimately pushed the Wehrmacht and its allies out of northern Serbia and led to the capture of Belgrade. Marshal Fyodor Tolbukhin's Third Ukrainian Front had to request formal permission from Tito's provisional government to enter Yugoslavia and had to accept Yugoslav civil authority in any liberated territory.

== Deteriorating relations ==
=== Yugoslav foreign policy, 1945–1947 ===
The Free Territory of Trieste was a nominally independent territory centered on the Adriatic city of Trieste. It was claimed by Italy and Yugoslavia, and became a source of conflict between Yugoslavia and the Western Allies. Prior to its dissolution, the territory consisted of Zones A and B, administered by the Western Allies and Yugoslavia, respectively. The Yugoslav zone was ultimately divided between the federated republics of Croatia and Slovenia.

The Soviet Union and Yugoslavia signed a friendship treaty when Tito met with Stalin in Moscow in April 1945. They established good bilateral relations despite differences in opinion on how to bring about a communist or socialist society. In 1945, Yugoslavia relied on United Nations Relief and Rehabilitation Administration aid as it experienced food shortages, but it gave much greater internal publicity to comparably smaller Soviet assistance. On 10 January 1945, Stalin called Yugoslavia's foreign policy unreasonable because of its territorial claims against most of its neighbours, including Hungary, Austria, and the Free Territory of Trieste, which had been carved out of pre-war Italian territory. Tito then delivered a speech criticising the Soviet Union for not backing his territorial demands. The confrontation with the Western Allies became tense in August 1946 when Yugoslav fighter aircraft forced a United States Army Air Forces Douglas C-47 Skytrain to crash-land near Ljubljana and shot down another above Bled, capturing ten and killing a crew of five in the span of ten days. The Western Allies incorrectly believed that Stalin encouraged Tito's persistence; Stalin actually wished to avoid confrontation with the West.

Tito also sought to establish regional dominance over Yugoslavia's southern neighbours—Albania, Bulgaria, and Greece. The first overtures in this direction occurred in 1943 when a proposal for a regional headquarters to coordinate national Partisan actions fell through. Tito, who saw the Yugoslav component of the Partisans as superior, declined to go ahead with any scheme that would give other national components equal say. The pre-war partition of Macedonia into Vardar, Pirin, and Aegean Macedonia—controlled by Yugoslavia, Bulgaria, and Greece respectively—complicated regional relations. The presence of a substantial ethnic Albanian population in the Yugoslav region of Kosovo further impeded relations. In 1943, the PKSH had proposed the transfer of Kosovo to Albania, only to be confronted with a counterproposal: incorporating Albania into a future Yugoslav federation. Tito and PKSH first secretary Enver Hoxha revisited the idea in 1946, agreeing to merge the two countries.

After the war, Tito continued to pursue dominance in the region. In 1946, Albania and Yugoslavia signed a treaty on mutual assistance and customs agreements, almost completely integrating Albania into the Yugoslav economic system. Nearly a thousand Yugoslav economic development experts were sent to Albania, and a KPJ representative was added to the PKSH Central Committee. The two countries' militaries also cooperated, at least in the mining of the Corfu Channel in October 1946—an action which damaged two Royal Navy destroyers and resulted in 44 dead and 42 injured. Even though the Soviet Union had previously indicated it would only deal with Albania through Yugoslavia, Stalin cautioned the Yugoslavs not to pursue unification with haste.

In August 1947, Bulgaria and Yugoslavia signed a friendship and mutual assistance treaty in Bled without consulting the Soviet Union, leading Soviet Foreign Minister Vyacheslav Molotov to denounce it. Despite this, when the Cominform was established in September to facilitate international Communist activity and communication, the Soviets openly touted Yugoslavia as a model for the Eastern Bloc to emulate. From 1946, internal reports from the Soviet embassy in Belgrade began to portray Yugoslav leaders in increasingly unfavourable terms.

=== Integration with Albania and support for Greek insurgents ===
The Soviet Union began sending its own advisors to Albania in mid-1947, which Tito saw as a threat to the further integration of Albania into Yugoslavia. He attributed the move to a power struggle within the PKSH Central Committee involving Hoxha, the interior minister Koçi Xoxe, and the economy and industry minister, Naco Spiru. Spiru was seen as the prime opponent of links with Yugoslavia and advocated closer ties between Albania and the Soviet Union. Prompted by Yugoslav accusations and urged on by Xoxe, Hoxha launched an investigation into Spiru. A few days later, Spiru died in unclear circumstances; his death was officially declared a suicide. Following Spiru's death, there were a series of meetings of Yugoslav and Soviet diplomats and officials on the matter of integration, culminating in a meeting between Stalin and KPJ official Milovan Đilas in December 1947 and January 1948. By its conclusion, Stalin supported the integration of Albania into Yugoslavia, provided it was postponed for a more opportune time and carried out with the consent of the Albanians. It is still unclear if Stalin was sincere in his support or if he was pursuing a delaying tactic. Regardless, Đilas perceived Stalin's support as genuine.

Yugoslav support to the Communist Party of Greece (KKE) and KKE-led Democratic Army of Greece (DSE) in the Greek Civil War indirectly encouraged Albanian support for closer ties with Yugoslavia. The civil war in Greece reinforced the Albanian perception that the Yugoslav and Albanian borders were threatened by Greece. Furthermore, the DSE promised to cede Aegean Macedonia to Yugoslavia in return for the Yugoslav support when it comes to power in Greece. There was a United States intelligence-gathering operation in the country. In 1947, twelve British Secret Intelligence Service-trained agents were airdropped in central Albania to start an insurrection, which did not materialise. The Yugoslavs hoped that the perceived Greek threat would increase Albanian support for integration with Yugoslavia. Soviet envoys to Albania deemed the effort successful in instilling Albanians with a fear of Greeks along with a perception that Albania could not defend itself on its own, although Soviet sources indicated there was no actual threat of a Greek invasion of Albania. Tito thought, since many DSE fighters were ethnic Macedonians, cooperating with the DSE might allow Yugoslavia to annex Greek territory by expanding into Aegean Macedonia even if the DSE failed to seize power.

Shortly after Đilas and Stalin met, Tito suggested to Hoxha that Albania should permit Yugoslavia to use military bases near Korçë, close to the Albanian–Greek border, to defend against a potential Greek and Anglo–American attack. By the end of January, Hoxha accepted the idea. Moreover, Xoxe indicated that the integration of the Albanian and Yugoslav armies had been approved. Even though the matter was supposedly conducted in secrecy, the Soviets learned of the scheme from a source in the Albanian government.

=== Federation with Bulgaria ===
In late 1944, Stalin first proposed a Yugoslav–Bulgarian federation, involving a dualist state where Bulgaria would be one half of the federation and Yugoslavia (further divided into its republics) the other. The Yugoslav position was that a federation was possible, but only if Bulgaria were one of the seven federal units and if Pirin Macedonia was ceded to the nascent Yugoslav federal unit of Macedonia. Since the two sides could not agree, Stalin invited them to Moscow in January 1945 for arbitration—first supporting the Bulgarian view—and days later switching to the Yugoslav position. Finally, on 26 January, the British government warned the Bulgarian authorities against any federation arrangement with Yugoslavia before Bulgaria signed a peace treaty with the Allies. The federation was shelved, to Tito's relief.

Three years later, in 1948, when Tito and Hoxha were preparing to deploy the Yugoslav People's Army to Albania, the Bulgarian Workers' Party leader Georgi Dimitrov spoke to Western journalists about turning the Eastern Bloc into a federally organised state. He then included Greece in a list of "people's democracies", causing concern in the West and in the Soviet Union. Tito sought to distance Yugoslavia from the idea, but the Soviets came to believe that Dimitrov's remarks were influenced by Yugoslavia's intentions in the Balkans. On 1 February 1948, Molotov instructed the Yugoslav and Bulgarian leaders to send representatives to Moscow by 10 February for discussions. On 5 February, just days before the scheduled meeting with Stalin, the DSE launched its general offensive, shelling Thessaloniki four days later.

=== February 1948 meeting with Stalin ===
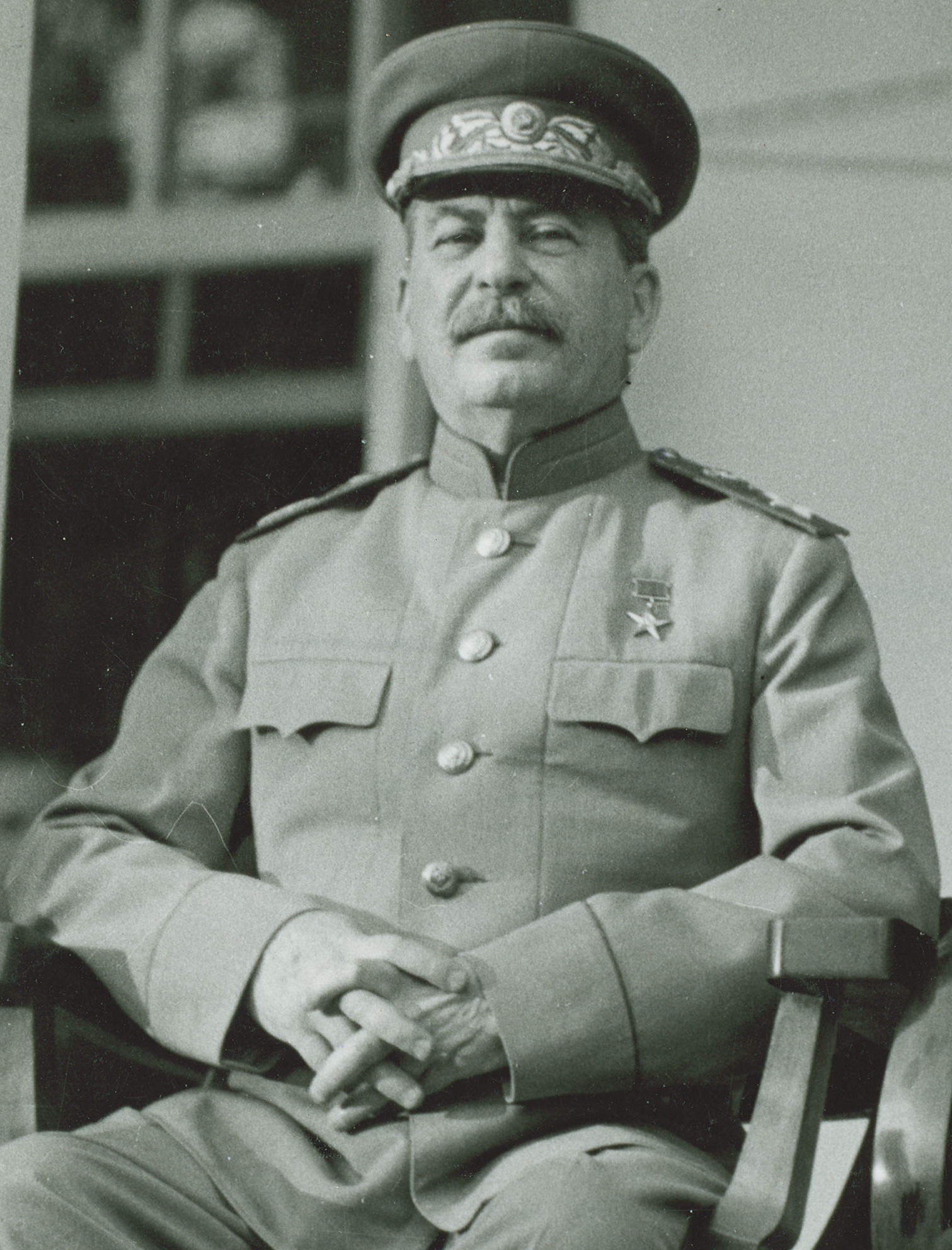
Soviet leader Joseph Stalin met Yugoslav officials in Moscow in February 1948, shortly before the split.

In response to Molotov's summons, Tito dispatched Kardelj and President of the Executive Council of the People's Republic of Croatia Vladimir Bakarić to Moscow, where they joined Đilas. Stalin berated Yugoslavia and Dimitrov for ignoring the Soviet Union by signing the Bled Agreement, and for Dimitrov's call to include Greece in a hypothetical federation with Bulgaria and Yugoslavia. He also demanded an end to the insurrection in Greece, arguing that any further support for the Communist guerrillas there might lead to a wider conflict with the United States and the United Kingdom. By limiting his support to the DSE, Stalin adhered to the Percentages Agreement, an informal deal Stalin and Winston Churchill had struck in Moscow in October 1944, which placed Greece in the British sphere of influence.

Stalin also demanded an immediate federation consisting of Bulgaria and Yugoslavia. According to Stalin, Albania would join later. At the same time, he expressed support for similar unions of Hungary and Romania and of Poland and Czechoslovakia. Yugoslav and Bulgarian participants in the meeting acknowledged mistakes, and Stalin made Kardelj and Dimitrov sign a treaty obliging Yugoslavia and Bulgaria to consult the Soviet Union on all foreign policy matters. The KPJ politburo met in secret on 19 February and decided against any federation with Bulgaria. Two days later, Tito, Kardelj, and Đilas met with Nikos Zachariadis, the general secretary of the KKE. They informed Zachariadis that Stalin was opposed to the KKE's armed struggle but promised continued Yugoslav support, nonetheless.

The KPJ Central Committee met on 1 March and noted that Yugoslavia would remain independent only if it resisted Soviet designs for the economic development of the Eastern Bloc. The Soviet Union viewed the Yugoslav five-year development plan unfavourably because it did not align with the needs of the Eastern Bloc but prioritised development based solely on local development needs. The Central Committee also dismissed the possibility of a federation with Bulgaria, interpreting it as a form of Trojan horse tactic, and decided to proceed with the existing policy towards Albania. Politburo member and government minister Sreten Žujović, who was not present at the meeting on 19 February, attended the 1 March meeting and informed the Soviets.

In Albania, Xoxe purged all anti-Yugoslav forces from the PKSH Central Committee at a plenum of 26 February–8 March. The PKSH Central Committee adopted a resolution that official Albanian policy was pro-Yugoslav. The Albanian authorities adopted an additional secret document detailing a planned merger of the Albanian and Yugoslav armies, citing the threat of a Greek invasion and arguing that having Yugoslav troops at the Albanian-Greek border was an "urgent necessity". In response to these moves, Soviet military advisers were withdrawn from Yugoslavia on 18 March.

== Stalin's letters and open conflict ==
=== First letter ===
Tito sent a letter to Molotov on 20 March 1948 protesting the secret withdrawal of Soviet experts. On 27 March, Stalin sent his first letter addressed to Tito and Kardelj, which formulated the conflict as an ideological one. In his letter, Stalin denounced Tito and Kardelj, as well as Đilas, Svetozar Vukmanović, Boris Kidrič, and Aleksandar Ranković, as "dubious Marxists" responsible for the anti-Soviet atmosphere in Yugoslavia. Stalin also criticised Yugoslav policies on security, the economy, and political appointments. In particular, he resented the suggestion that Yugoslavia was more revolutionary than the Soviet Union, drawing comparisons to the positions and the fate of Leon Trotsky. The purpose of the letter was to urge loyal Communists to remove the "dubious Marxists". The Soviets maintained contact with Žujović and the former minister of industry Andrija Hebrang and, in early 1948, instructed Žujović to oust Tito from office. They hoped to secure the position of the general secretary of the KPJ for Žujović and have Hebrang fill the post of the prime minister.

Tito convened the KPJ Central Committee on 12 April to draw up a letter in response to Stalin. Tito repudiated Stalin's claims and referred to them as slander and misinformation. He also emphasised the KPJ's achievements of national independence and equality. Žujović was the only one to oppose Tito at the meeting. He advocated making Yugoslavia a part of the Soviet Union, and questioned what the country's future position in international relations would be if the alliance between the two countries was not maintained. Tito called for action against Žujović and Hebrang. He denounced Hebrang, claiming that his actions were the primary reason for Soviet mistrust. To discredit him, charges were fabricated alleging that Hebrang had become a spy for the Croatian ultra-nationalist and fascist Ustaše movement during his captivity in 1942, and that he was subsequently blackmailed with that information by the Soviets. Both Žujović and Hebrang were apprehended within a week.

=== Second letter ===
On 4 May, Stalin sent the second letter to the KPJ. He denied the Soviet leadership was misinformed about the situation in Yugoslavia and claimed that the differences were over a matter of principle. He also denied Hebrang was a Soviet source in the KPJ but confirmed that Žujović was indeed one. Stalin questioned the scale of KPJ's achievements, alleging that the success of any communist party depended on Red Army assistance—implying the Soviet military was essential to whether or not the KPJ retained power. Finally, he suggested taking the matter up before the Cominform. In their response to the second letter, Tito and Kardelj rejected arbitration by the Cominform and accused Stalin of lobbying other communist parties to affect the outcome of the dispute. Hebrang and Žujović were dismissed on 8 May for "deviationism", the first public indication of what was happening. Those outside the government believed that it was a domestic issue.

=== Third letter and Cominform Resolution ===
On 19 May, Tito received an invitation for the Yugoslav delegation to attend a Cominform meeting to discuss the situation concerning the KPJ. However, the KPJ Central Committee rejected the invitation the next day. Stalin then sent his third letter, now addressed to Tito and Hebrang, stating that failure to speak on behalf of the KPJ before the Cominform would amount to a tacit admission of guilt. On 19 June, the KPJ received a formal invitation to attend the Cominform meeting in Bucharest two days later. The KPJ leadership informed the Cominform that they would not send any delegates. The public noticed that Stalin did not congratulate Tito on his official birthday of 25 May, unlike the previous year. Rumors spread that a Cominform meeting in June in Belgrade would instead be in Prague, and that the meetings would be secret.

A Guardian article on 26 June reporting on a Yugoslavia-USSR split received little attention. Yugoslavs themselves first learned of the split on 28 June, when the official Prague newspaper Rudé právo published the Cominform's Resolution on the KPJ, criticising the KPJ for anti-Sovietism and ideological errors, lack of democracy in the party, and an inability to accept criticism. Moreover, the Cominform accused the KPJ of opposing the parties within the organisation, splitting from the united socialist front, betraying international solidarity of the working people, and assuming a nationalist posture. Finally, the KPJ was declared outside the Cominform. The resolution claimed there were "healthy" members of the KPJ whose loyalty would be measured by their readiness to overthrow Tito and his leadership—expecting this to be achieved solely because of Stalin's charisma. Stalin expected the KPJ to back down, sacrifice the "dubious Marxists", and realign itself with him. Radio Belgrade officially responded to the resolution on 30 June. On 25 July pamphlets written in Serbo-Croatian appeared in Belgrade. Printed by the Pravda presses in Moscow, they were a Soviet attempt to bypass Yugoslav leaders and persuade citizens to overthrow them. Police did not succeed in suppressing the pamphlets; the government responded two weeks later with its own pamphlet.

== Aftermath ==
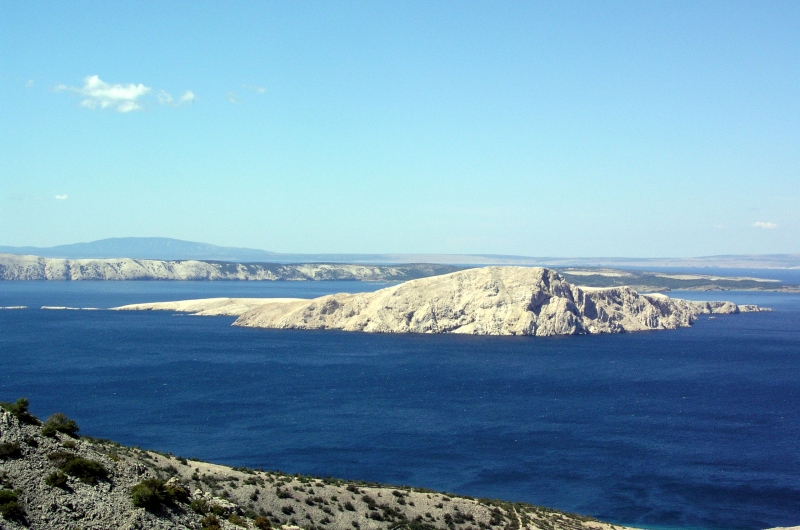
A prison camp was built on the Goli Otok to detain people convicted of supporting Stalin after the split from the Soviet Union.

"The Kremlin lost massive and irretrievable prestige", Gunther wrote, as "the international front of world Communism has for the first time been broken". Citing the Molotov-Ribbentrop Pact, however, he cautioned that the split might not be permanent.

After the split Tito took careful precautions to protect himself against Soviet assassination, which some expected to occur soon. Gunther wrote that while the USSR was intent on preventing Yugoslavia from "contaminating" other Eastern Bloc countries, and the Yugoslav security force was too busy following Russian and Eastern Bloc visitors to bother with Americans, Gunther expressed his opinion that "many Yugoslavs themselves would probably like to be forgiven and taken back into the fold". He noted that pictures of Lenin, Stalin, were common on streets, noticing one Molotov postcard in a street market, while rare in more "loyal" satellite states. Faced with the choice of resisting or submitting to Stalin, Tito chose the former, likely counting on the KPJ's wide organic base, built through the Partisan movement, to support him. It is estimated that up to 20 percent of the KPJ's membership supported Stalin instead of Tito. The party's leadership noticed this, and it led to wide-ranging purges that went far beyond the most visible targets like Hebrang and Žujović. These purges came to be referred to as the Informbiro period, meaning the "Cominform period". The real or perceived supporters of Stalin were termed "Cominformists" or "ibeovci" as a pejorative initialism based on the first two words in the official name of the Cominform—the Information Bureau of the Communist and Workers' Parties. Thousands were imprisoned, killed, or exiled. According to Ranković, 51,000 people were killed, imprisoned, or sentenced to forced labour. In 1949, special-purpose prison camps were built for male and female Cominformists on the uninhabited Adriatic islands of Goli Otok and Sveti Grgur respectively.

Despite the split, Yugoslavia was a Communist state that followed the Soviet model very closely; the government was, unlike other Eastern Bloc states in 1948-1949, not a multiparty coalition. Its leaders believed that they were better Communists than those in Moscow, and Russian Marxist-Leninist books were widely available. Yugoslavia cooperated with the USSR in the United Nations and elsewhere. The Yugoslav army was probably the strongest in Europe after the Soviet; Gunther quoted an official who said that his country would fight against the United States in a war "because we are real Communists!" (Gunther mused in a footnote, "Events may very well prove him to be wrong".)

=== U.S. aid to Yugoslavia ===
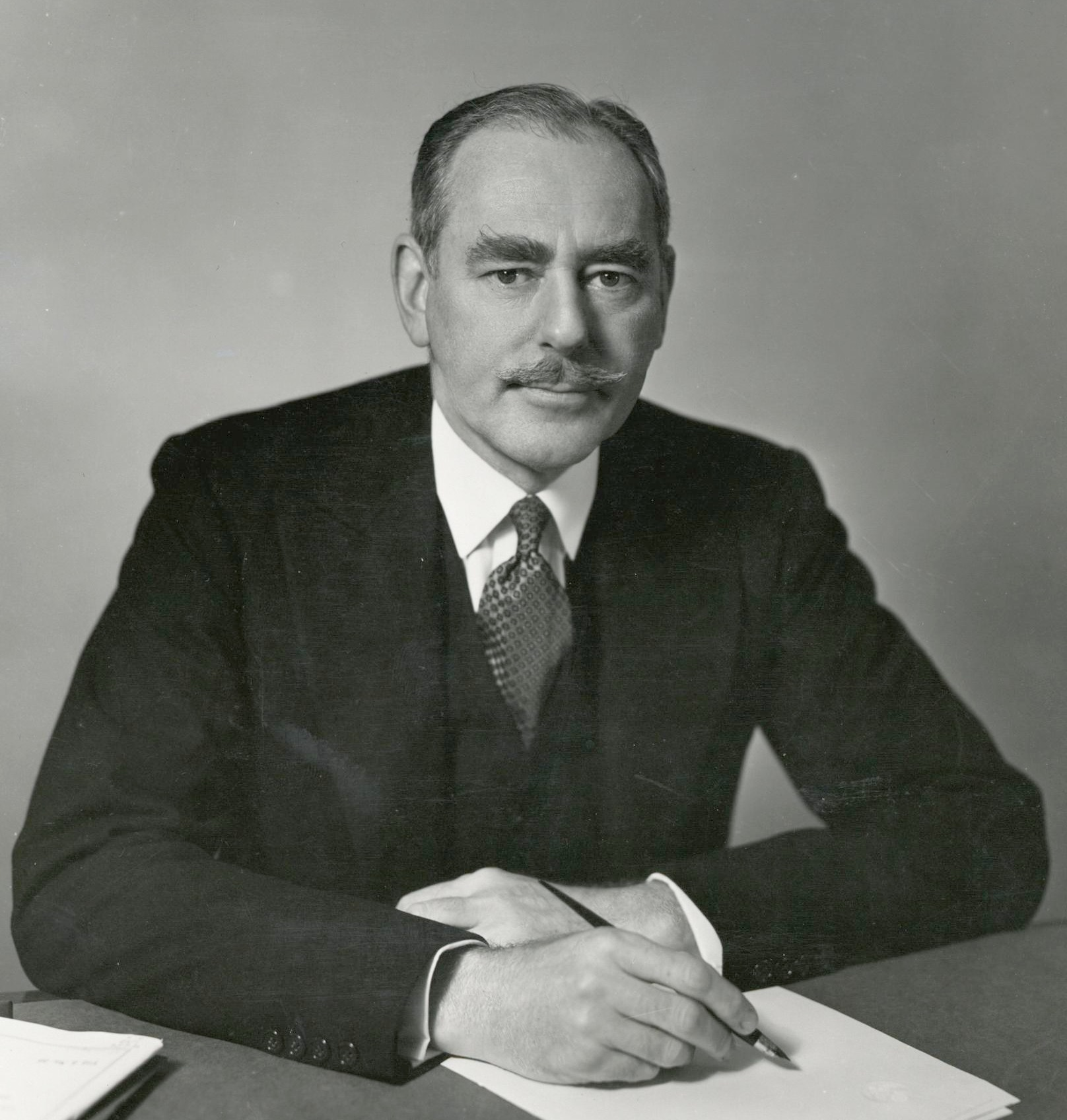
Secretary of State Dean Acheson recognised that it was in the United States' interest to provide aid to Tito in the early years of the Cold War.

Yugoslavia faced significant economic difficulties as a result of the split since its planned economy had depended on unimpeded trade with the Soviet Union and the Eastern Bloc. Two thirds of Yugoslav exports traditionally went to Russia. Fear of war with the Soviet Union resulted in a high degree of military spending—rising to 21.4 percent of the national income in 1952. The United States regarded the split as an opportunity to score a Cold War victory, but it employed a cautious approach, uncertain if the rift would be permanent or if Yugoslav foreign policy would change.

Yugoslavia first requested assistance from the United States in the summer of 1948. In December, Tito announced that strategic raw materials would be shipped to the West in return for increased trade. In February 1949, the U.S. decided to provide Tito with economic assistance. In return, the U.S. demanded the cessation of Yugoslav aid to the DSE when the internal situation in Yugoslavia allowed for such a move without endangering Tito's position. Ultimately, Secretary of State Dean Acheson took the position that the Yugoslav five-year plan would have to succeed if Tito was to prevail against Stalin. Acheson also argued that supporting Tito was in the interest of the United States, regardless of the nature of Tito's regime. The American aid helped Yugoslavia overcome the poor harvests of 1948, 1949 and 1950, but there would be almost no economic growth before 1952. Tito also received U.S. backing in Yugoslavia's successful 1949 bid for a seat on the United Nations Security Council, despite Soviet opposition.

In 1949, the United States provided loans to Yugoslavia, increased them in 1950, and then provided large grants. The Yugoslavs initially avoided seeking military aid from the U.S., believing it would provide the Soviets with a pretext for invasion. By 1951, the Yugoslav authorities became convinced that a Soviet attack was inevitable irrespective of military aid from the West. Consequently, Yugoslavia was included in the Mutual Defense Assistance Program.

=== Soviet actions and military coup ===
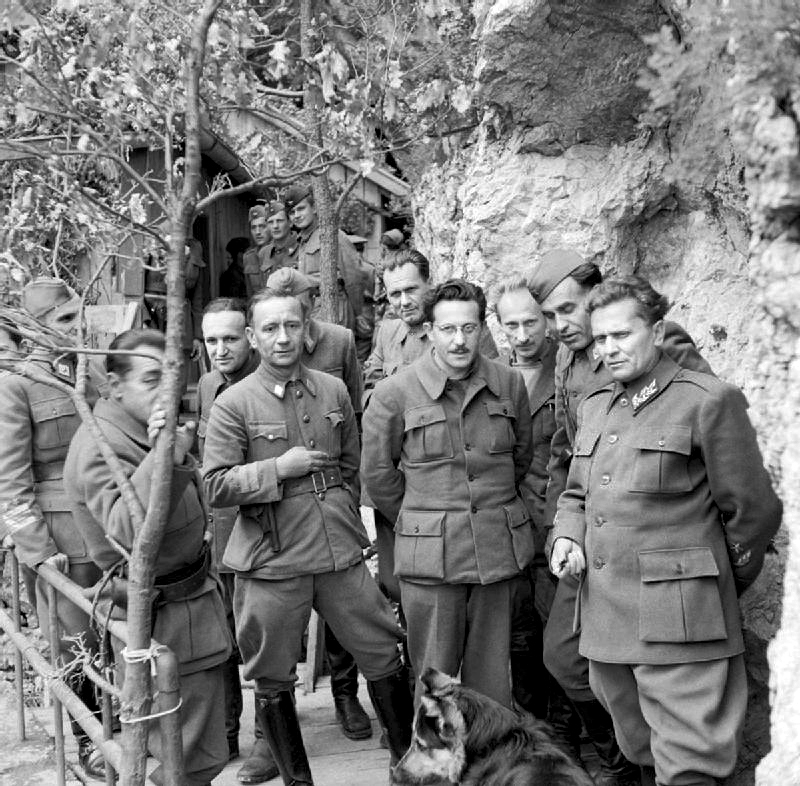
Protagonists of the split when they worked together. At Tito's wartime headquarters in Drvar, in 1944, days before Operation Rösselsprung: Tito (1st from right), Žujović (2nd), Kardelj (4th), and Jovanović (far left, partially hidden behind tree)

When the conflict became public in 1948, Stalin embarked upon a propaganda campaign against Tito. The Soviet Union's allies blockaded their borders with Yugoslavia; there were 7,877 border incidents. By 1953, Soviet or Soviet-backed incursions had resulted in the deaths of 27 Yugoslav security personnel. It is unclear whether the Soviets planned any military intervention against Yugoslavia after the split. Hungarian Major General Béla Király, who defected to the United States in 1956, claimed that such plans existed. Later research by Hungarian historian László Ritter disputed Király's claim. Ritter based his opinion on the absence of any former Soviet or Warsaw Pact archival material documenting such plans, adding that the Soviet and Hungarian armies made plans expecting an attack by the Western allies through Yugoslavia, potentially supported by Yugoslav forces. A major component of those preparations was the construction of large-scale fortifications along the Hungarian–Yugoslav border. The Yugoslavs believed that a Soviet invasion was likely or imminent and made defensive plans accordingly. A message Stalin sent to Czechoslovak President Klement Gottwald shortly after the June 1948 Cominform meeting suggests that Stalin's objective was to isolate Yugoslavia—thereby causing its decline—instead of toppling Tito. In an effort to discredit Tito, the Soviets helped Bulgaria establish three intelligence operations posts along the country's border with Yugoslavia – in Vidin, Slivnitsa, and Dupnitsa. Their purpose was to establish channels for the distribution of propaganda materials against Tito and maintain connections with Cominform supporters in Yugoslavia. It is also possible Stalin was dissuaded from intervening by the United States' response to the outbreak of the Korean War in 1950.

In the immediate aftermath of the split, there was at least one failed attempt at a Yugoslav military coup supported by the Soviets. It was headed by the Chief of the General Staff, Colonel General Arso Jovanović, Major General Branko Petričević Kadja, and Colonel Vladimir Dapčević. The plot was foiled and border guards killed Jovanović near Vršac while he was attempting to flee to Romania. Petričević was arrested in Belgrade and Dapčević was arrested just as he was about to cross the Hungarian border. Jovanović was said to have intended to set up a government in exile in Romania. The USSR proclaimed him a hero, and celebrated Žujović, Hebrang, and other alleged victims of the "Tito terror". In 1952, the Soviet Ministry of State Security planned to assassinate Tito with a biological agent and a poison codenamed Scavenger, but Stalin died in 1953, before the plot could be implemented.

In Eastern Bloc politics, the split with Yugoslavia led to the denunciation and prosecution of alleged Titoists, designed to strengthen Stalin's control over the bloc's communist parties. They resulted in show trials of high-ranking officials such as Xoxe, General Secretary of the Communist Party of Czechoslovakia Rudolf Slánský, Hungarian interior and foreign minister László Rajk, and General Secretary of the Bulgarian Workers' Party Central Committee, Traicho Kostov. Furthermore, Albania and Bulgaria turned away from Yugoslavia and aligned themselves entirely with the Soviet Union. Irrespective of the DSE's reliance on Yugoslavia, the KKE also sided with the Cominform, declaring its support for Yugoslavia's fragmentation and the independence of Macedonia. In July 1949, Yugoslavia cut off support to the Greek guerrillas and the DSE collapsed almost immediately.

== See also ==
- De-satellization of the Socialist Republic of Romania
- De-Stalinization
- Sino-Soviet split
- Albanian–Soviet split
