= Antun Branko Šimić =

Bosnian and Croatian poet

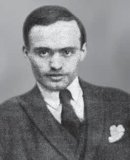
- Born: 18 October 1898; Drinovci, Condominium of Bosnia and Herzegovina, Austria-Hungary
- Died: 2 May 1925 (aged 26); Zagreb, Kingdom of Serbs, Croats and Slovenes
- Occupations: Poet, journalist, writer and critic
- Writing career
- Genre: Poetry
- Literary movement: Expressionism

Antun Branko Šimić (18 November 1898 – 2 May 1925) was a Bosnian and Croatian expressionist poet, considered to be one of the most important poets of Croatian literature of the 20th century.

== Life ==
He was born to a Croat family from Drinovci near Grude on 18 November 1898, in the family of Vida and Martin Šimić. He attended primary school in his native village, and then the first three forms of the Franciscan classical gymnasium in Široki Brijeg. He decided to change schools in the fourth form. He went to Mostar. Afterwards, to Vinkovci (Gymnasium Vinkovci). His unruly spirit made him change his surroundings again, and so he continued his education in Zagreb, in the upper town grammar school.

In 1917, he started the journal for art and culture, Vijavica (Whirlwind), which forced him to leave school. This is when he lost his parents' support and it also meant a hard life overpowered by many illnesses. After four issues of Vijavica, taking the example of the German journal Der Sturm, he also launched another journal, Juriš (Attack), which likewise had a short life of three issues only. He went on writing poems, literary and art critiques, and translating. At the Faculty of Philosophy he met Tatjana Marinić to whom he dedicated his only collection, Preobraženja (Metamorphoses) in 1920.

Between 1918 and 1919, he immersed himself in writing poems whilst staying in a hamlet of Drinovci, Dubrava Majići, in a cottage where his mother grew up. Some of his first expressionist works were created here, most notably "Ja pjevam" (I Sing), "Povratak" (The Return) and "Ljubav" (Love).

His modest income and dedication to his literary work left a mark on his health, so he returned to Drinovci in December 1923 and made up with his father. When he returned to Zagreb in spring 1924, he launched his third journal, Književnik (Writer). Some time in 1924, he contracted tuberculosis, for which he received treatment later that year in a hospital in Dubrovnik, and spent time recuperating in a sanatorium in Cavtat. However, after his return to Zagreb in February 1925, his condition rapidly worsened. He died on 2 May 1925 in a hospital in Zagreb and was buried in Mirogoj Cemetery.

== Works ==
Šimić did not write an extensive literary opus during his lifetime. However, some of his poems could be called anthological, like "Pjesnici" (Poets), "Veče i ja" (The Evening and I), "Opomena" (Warning), "Ručak siromaha" (The Poor Man's Dinner), "Žene pred uredima" (Women in Front of Offices), "Smrt i ja" (Death and I), "Pjesma jednom brijegu" (Poem to a Mountain), "Smrt" (Death), and some others. After writing under the influence of Matoš, Kranjčević, Vidrić and Domjanić, he bore down on the traditionalists and started favouring an unrestrained expression and expressionist spirit. In his collection Preobraženja (Metamorphoses), using free verse, he wrote tersely, rhythmically, gnomically and logically.

He would also sometimes resort to the decasyllabic line and the folk lament. His topics are the man, pain, poverty, stars, Herzegovina, the poor, life and death ("death is something quite human"). When he turns to the man, he warns him: Be careful not to go, small as thou art, under the stars, man (from the poem Warning). When he writes about the mystery and perseverance, he says: We watch each other silently. Mountain and man. I'll never know where our different meanings meet- (Poem to a mountain).

Šimić published his essays in his journals that defended the principles of expressionism, which influenced his later poetry. In particular, his views were based on the tenets of German Expressionism.

The image of A.B. Šimić can be seen on Federation of BiH issue of the 20 km banknote.

== See also ==
- Antun Branko Šimić Award

== Bibliography ==
- Mihanović, Nedjeljko (2012). "Ljetopis Antuna Branka Šimića" (PDF). Izabrane pjesme. Stoljeća hrvatske književnosti (in Croatian). Zagreb: Matica hrvatska. pp. 43–47. ISBN 978-953-150-316-7.
- Pandžić Jakšić, Vlatka; Pandžić Kuliš, Drijenka (2011). ""Vraćanje suncu" Antuna Branka Šimića" (PDF). Acta Medica Croatica (in Croatian). 65 (5): 459–466.
