= Mile Pešorda =

Croatian writer

Mile Pešorda (born 15 August 1950 in Grude) is a Croatian and Bosnian writer. He is a recipient of the Antun Branko Šimić Award.
