= Sveti Grgur =

Island of Croatia

Coordinates: 44°52′5″N 14°45′33″E

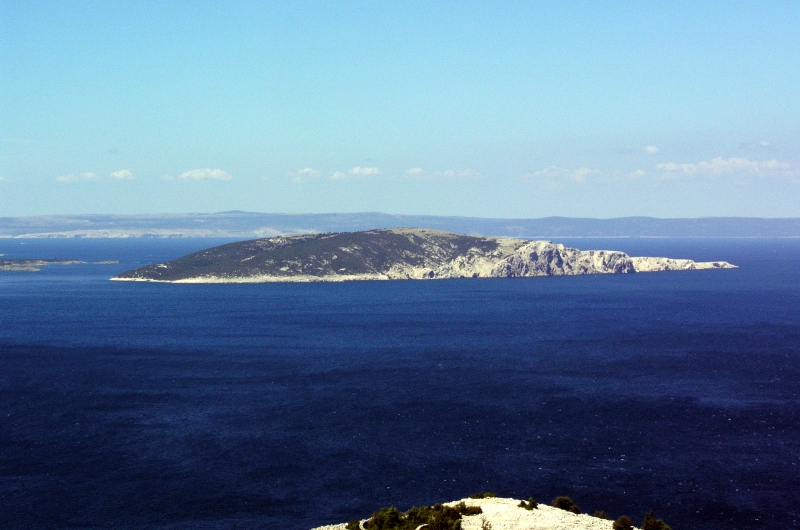
- Map of Sveti Grgur

- Location within Croatia
- Interactive map of Sveti Grgur

Geography
- Location: Adriatic Sea
- Area: 6.37 km^{2} (2.46 sq mi)
- Highest elevation: 226 m (741 ft)
- Highest point: Štandarac

Administration
- Croatia
- County: Primorje-Gorski Kotar County

Demographics
- Population: 0

Sveti Grgur (Croatian pronunciation: [svȇtī gr̂guːr]; lit. 'Saint Gregory') is an uninhabited island in Croatia, on the Adriatic Sea between Rab and Krk. The island was the site of a women's prison in SFR Yugoslavia, in tandem with nearby Goli Otok which served the same purpose for men, from 1949 to 1980.

== See also ==
- Goli otok

== Literature ==
- Milutin Popović, Sećanja na logor Sveti Grgur. Symix graphics, Beograd, 1991.
- Ženi Lebl, LJUBIČICA BELA - White Violet with the subtitle "Two and half years in the Yugoslav Gulag for women", Belgrade, 2009
