= Mirko Marjanović (writer) =

Croatian writer

Mirko Marjanović (Croatian pronunciation: [mǐːrko marjǎːnoʋit͡ɕ]; 13 July 1940) is a Croatian writer.

He was born in Gornja Tramošnica near Gradačac, Bosnia and Herzegovina. He graduated at the Higher Pedagogical School in Sarajevo. He was the chief editor of Život (1980–84), editor of the publishing house Svjetlost (1984–94), and in the period 1996-2006 editor of the quarterly Hrvatska misao.

His novels and short stories cover topics from the Bosnian history, with mythical overtones and a penchant for fiction.

== Works ==
- U ime oca i sina, 1969 (novel)
- Povijest izgubljene duše, 1980 (novel)
- Braća, 1983 (novel)
- Topot divljih konja, 1989 (novel)
- Osmjehni se i u plaču, 2000 (novel)
- Središte, 1973 (short story)
- Živjeti smrt: sarajevski dnevnik, 1996
- Treći svjetski rat, 1999
