= Jovan Byford =

British psychologist (born 1973)

- Born: 1973 (age 52–53)
- Education: University of Kent MSc; Loughborough University PhD
- Occupations: Senior Lecturer; Social studies scholar

Jovan T. Byford (also Bajford, born 1973) is a British Senior Lecturer in Psychology at the Open University in the United Kingdom.

== Career and work ==
Byford was born in 1973, in Serbia, then part of former Yugoslavia. He received an M.Sc. in Social and Applied Psychology from the University of Kent and a Ph.D. in social sciences from Loughborough University. His interests lie in the interdisciplinary study of social and psychological aspects of shared beliefs and social remembering and more generally – the relationship between psychology and history. Byford has been widely publishing, authoring books, book chapters and journal articles based on conspiracy theories, antisemitism and Holocaust remembrance. He is considered an expert in the study of conspiracy theory.

== Books ==
- Denial and Repression of Antisemitism: Post-Communist Remembrance of the Serbian Bishop Nikolaj Velimirović (Central European University, 2008). ISBN 978-9-63977-615-9
- Discovering Psychology with Nicola Brace. (The Open University, 2010). ISBN 978-1-84873-466-1
- Conspiracy Theories: A Critical Introduction (Springer, 2011). ISBN 978-0-23034-921-6
- Psychology and History: Interdisciplinary Explorations co-edited with Cristian Tileagă (Cambridge University, 2014). ISBN 978-1-10703-431-0
- Picturing Genocide in the Independent State of Croatia: Atrocity Images and the Contested Memory of the Second World War in the Balkans (Bloomsbury, 2020). ISBN 978-1-35001-598-2
