= Dubravko Horvatić =

Croatian novelist, poet and essayist (1939–2004)

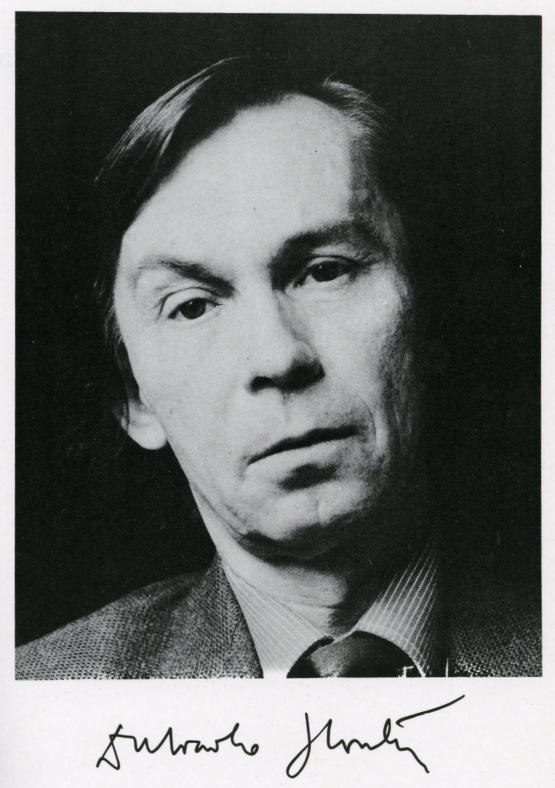
- Dubravko Horvatić
- Born: 9 December 1939; Zagreb, Yugoslavia
- Died: 20 May 2004 (aged 64); Zagreb, Croatia
- Occupations: Novelist, poet, essayist
- Writing career
- Language: Croatian
- Period: 1960–2003
- Notable works: Junačina Mijat Tomić; Grički top

Dubravko Horvatić (9 December 1939 – 20 May 2004) was a Croatian novelist, poet and essayist.

== Biography ==
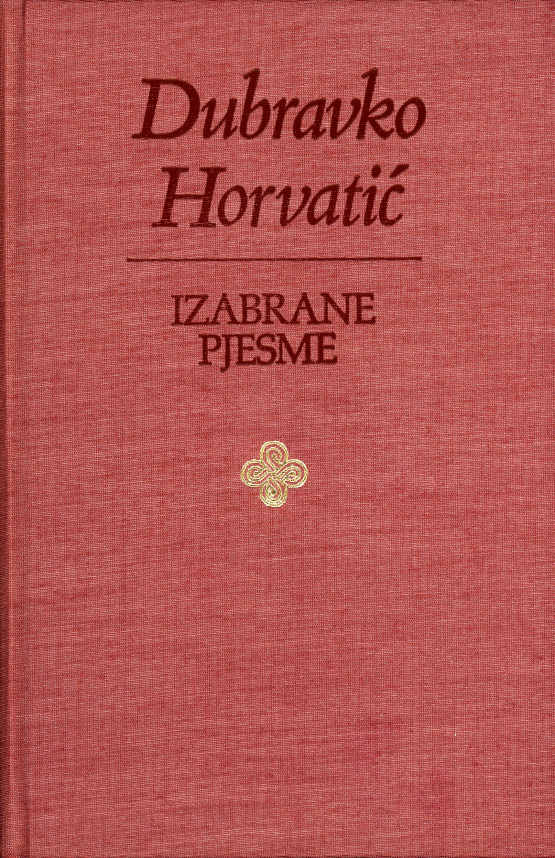
Izabrane pjesme

Dubravko Horvatić was born on 9 December 1939 in Zagreb. He finished Classical Gymnasium in Zagreb and enrolled Faculty of Humanities and Social Sciences in the same city. Horvatić wrote over fifty books. He was a member of Croatian Democratic Union. He died on 20 May 2004 in Zagreb at the age of 64.

== Works ==
Horvatić's works have been translated into 25 languages. His published works are:

- Groznica, Zagreb (1960)
- Zla vojna, Zagreb (1963)
- Bedem, Zagreb (1968)
- Remparts, Zagreb (1969)
- Stanari u slonu, Zagreb (1969)
- Crna zemlja, Zagreb (1970)
- Slike, kipovi, usudi', likovne kritike i eseji, Zagreb (1972)
- Hej, vatrogasci, požurite, Zagreb (1972)
- Reponje, Zagreb (1975)
- Ples smrti, Zagreb (1975)
- Sveti Juraj i zmaj, Zagreb-Tomislavgrad (1978)
- Podravska legenda, Zagreb (1979)
- Zvrkasti kalendar, Split-Tomislavgrad (1981)
- Junačina Mijat Tomić, Zagreb (1982)
- Bašćina, Zagreb (1982)
- Katarina, Maglaj (1983), Zagreb (2007)
- Hrvatska i druge zemlje, Zagreb (1984)
- Pleter oko slike, Zagreb (1985)
- Dalmacija, Zagreb (1986)
- Zrcala zbilja, Zagreb (1986)
- Grički top i druge legende, Zagreb (1987)
- Dar Gospodara Tame, Zagreb (1987)
- Sveti zrak, Klek-Zagreb (1988)
- Josip Turković, Zagreb (1988)
- Izabrane pjesme, Zagreb (1988)
- Olovna dolina, Zagreb (1989)
- Biser-voda s Manduševca, Zagreb (1990)
- Grički top, Zagreb (1990)
- Zagreb i okolica, Zagreb (1990, 1995)
- Zemlja, jezik, tisak, Zagreb (1990)
- Knjiga o Herceg-Bosni, Zagreb (1990)
- To je Hrvatska, Zagreb (1991)
- Hrvatska, Zagreb, (1991, 1996)
- Ponor, Zagreb (1992)
- Skaska o suživotu, Zagreb - Klek (1992)
- The Contribution of Croatians to Western Culture, Zagreb (1992)
- Hrvatine stoljećima, Zagreb (1992, 1996)
- Đavo u podne, Zagreb (1993)
- Nepostojeći hrvatski pisci, Zagreb - Sisak (1993)
- Ime zla, Zagreb (1994)
- Ježevi u krošnji, Zagreb (1994)
- Knjiga, rat, domovina, Zagreb (1995)
- Ratna noć, Zagreb (1995)
- Istini u oči, Zagreb (1998)
- Svjetionik, Zagreb (1999)
- Pabirci s poprišta, Zagreb (1999)
- Pleme Kroatana, Zagreb (1999)
- Dr. Franjo Tuđman - sinteza teorije i prakse, Zagreb (1999)
- Pravo na ljubav, pravo na smrt, Zagreb (2000)
- Hrvatska na stratištu, Zagreb (2001)
- Neprohodne magle, Zagreb (2001)
- Crne zastave, Zagreb (2001)
- U gostima kod ljudoždera, Zagreb (2002)
- Od Tuđmana do tuđinca, Zagreb (2002)
- Kalendarij hrvatske groteske, Zagreb (2003).
