= Gordana =

- Gender: Female
- Language: Slavic

Origin
- Origin: Slavic
- Meaning: Proud
- Region of origin: Slavic Europe

Other names
- Alternative spelling: Cyrillic: Гордана
- Variant form: Gordanka
- Nicknames: Dana, Goca
- Related names: male form Gordan
- See also: Gorana

Gordana (Cyrillic: Гордана) is a Slavic female first name, mostly used in Slavic countries such as Croatia, Serbia, Montenegro, North Macedonia, Slovenia, Bosnia and Herzegovina. The name is derived from Proto-Slavic *gъrdъ (gȏrd) "proud".

== Notable people ==
- Gordana Baric, international lawn bowls competitor for Australia
- Gordana Boban (born 1967), Bosnian actress
- Gordana Bogojević (1974–2009), Serbian basketball player
- Gordana Božinovska (born 1965), Serbian singer
- Gordana Čomić (born 1958), Serbian politician
- Gordana Ćulibrk (born 1952), Serbian writer
- Gordana Đilas (born 1958), Serbian poet
- Gordana Dukovic, American physical chemist
- Gordana Gadžić (born 1955), Serbian actress
- Gordana Garašić, Croatian army officer and Croatia's first female general officer
- Gordana Grubin (born 1972), Serbian basketball player
- Gordana Jankuloska (born 1975), Macedonian politician
- Gordana Jurčan (born 1971), Croatian volleyball player
- Gordana Kamenarović (born 1958), Serbian actress
- Gordana Knezević (born 1950), Serbian journalist
- Gordana Komadina (born 1976), Croatian basketball player
- Gordana Kozlovački (born 1958), Serbian politician, medical doctor, and administrator
- Gordana Kuić (1942–2023), Serbian novelist
- Gordana Predić, Serbian politician, administrator, and journalist
- Gordana Pop Lazić (born 1956), Serbian politician
- Gordana Marković (born 1951), Serbian chess player
- Gordana Matic, Croatian-American mathematician
- Gordana Matković (born 1960), Serbian politician
- Gordana Perkučin (born 1962), Serbian table tennis player
- Gordana Siljanovska-Davkova (born 1953), Macedonian jurist and 6th President of Macedonia
- Gordana Suša (1946–2021), Serbian journalist
- Gordana Marinković (born 1974), Serbian singer
- Gordana Turuk (born 1974), Slovak artist with Croatian heritage
- Gordana Vlajić (born 1959), Serbian author and political activist
- Gordana Vunjak-Novakovic, Serbian American biomedical engineer
