= List of Predrag Miletić performances =

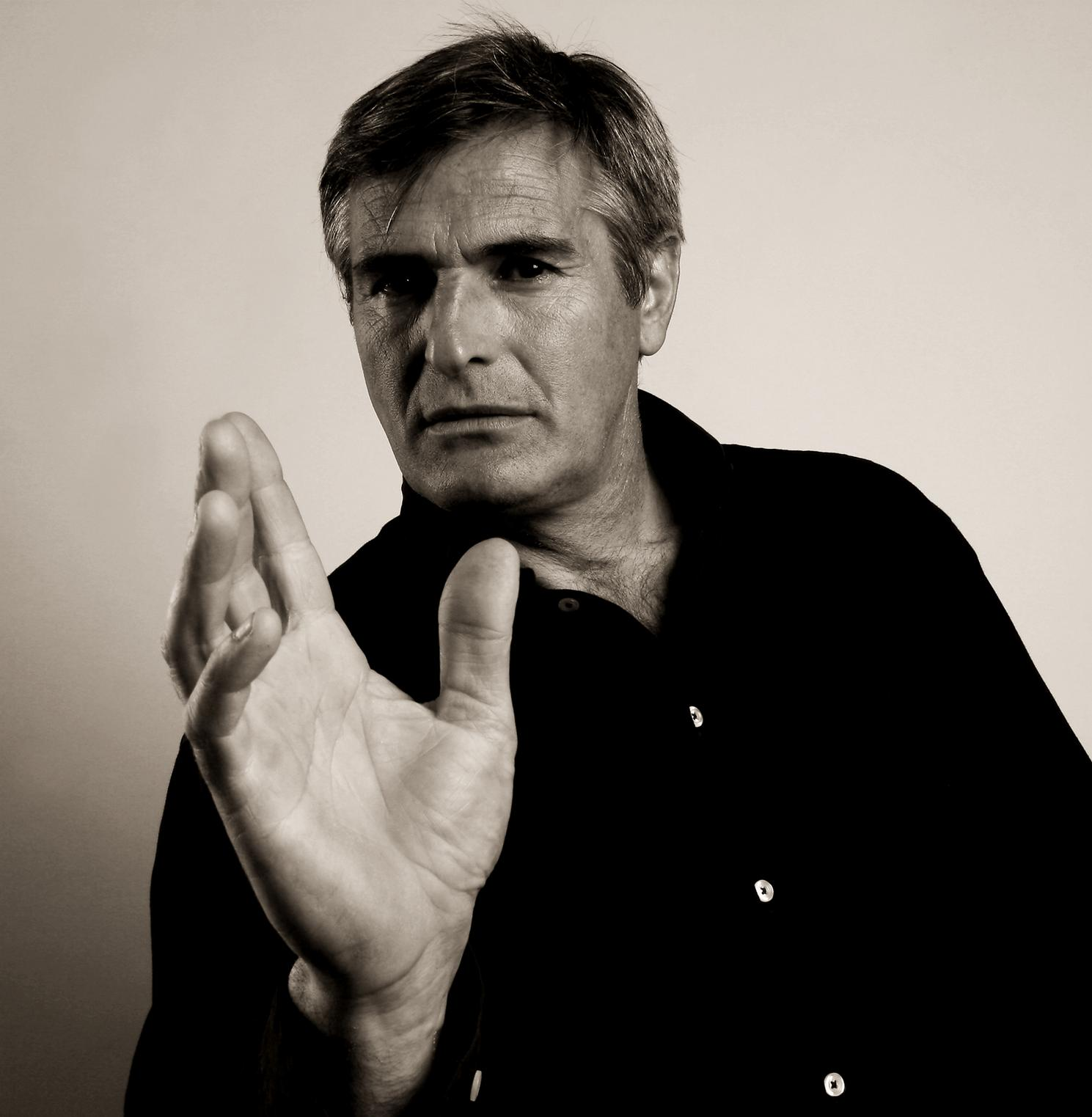
Predrag Miletić

Serbian actor Predrag Miletić on stage and screen:

== Career ==
=== Theater ===
First after graduation, he was invited by Terazije Theatre to play leading role of Antoni in La Mamma, by André Roussin, in 1979.

Year	Title	Author	Role	Theatre
1979	La mamma	André Roussin	Antony	Terazije Theatre
	Bele ruže za Dubljansku ulicu	Miodrag Županc		Belgrade Drama Theatre
1993	Mušica (The Midge)	Angelo Beolco Il Ruzzante	Tonin, soldier	"Z" Theatre
1979	Sporting Lajf	Bratislav Petković	Sportsman	Belgrade Drama Theatre
	Шумовање			Позориште „Под разно“
1989	Kanjoš Macedonović	Vida Ognjenović	Rado	Teatar City Budva Festival
	Zona Zamfirova	Stevan Sremac		National Theatre in Niš
	Уска стаза до дубоког севера			National Theatre in Niš
2012	Rebecca	Sylvester Levay	Colonel Julian	Madlenianum Opera and Theatre
1989	Oresteia	Aeschylus		National Theatre in Belgrade
1984	Kada su cvetale tikve	Dragoslav Mihajlović	Vlada, brother of Ljuba Sretenović	National Theatre in Belgrade
1989	Richard III	William Shakespeare		National Theatre in Belgrade
1981	Veličanstveni rogonja	Fernand Kromlenk	Man from Ostkerk	National Theatre in Belgrade
	Убише књаза			National Theatre in Belgrade
1994	Pobratim	Novica Savić	Mijat	National Theatre in Belgrade
	Kosovska Hronika			National Theatre in Belgrade
	Konak			National Theatre in Belgrade
	Apis			National Theatre in Belgrade
1991	Cyrano de Bergerac	Edmond Eugène Alexis Rostand	Cadet	National Theatre in Belgrade
1992	Tvrdica (Kir Janja)	Jovan Sterija Popović	Kir Dima	National Theatre in Belgrade
1995	Razvojni put Bore Žnajdera	Aleksandar Popović	Selimir	National Theatre in Belgrade
1993	The Taming of the Shrew	William Shakespeare	Biondello	National Theatre in Belgrade
1997	A Midsummer Night's Dream	William Shakespeare	Robin Starveling	National Theatre in Belgrade
2000	Maksim Crnojević	Laza Kostić	Duke Ilija Liković	National Theatre in Belgrade
2002	Velika drama	Siniša Kovačević	Ranko Mijović, četnik	National Theatre in Belgrade
2004	Zečiji nasip	Siniša Kovačević	Tiosav, policeman	National Theatre in Belgrade
2005	Koštana	Borisav Stanković	Grkljan, father of Koštana	National Theatre in Belgrade
2008	Vitamini	Vera Jon		National Theatre in Belgrade
1982	The Master and Margarita	Mikhail Afanasyevich Bulgakov	Executioner	National Theatre in Belgrade

==== Opera ====
Opera appearances at the National Theatre in Belgrade:

Year	Title	Author	Role	Theatre
1994	The Magic Flute	Wolfgang Amadeus Mozart	Armoured men	National Theatre in Belgrade
	Die Fledermaus	Johann Strauss II	Frosch, the jailer	National Theatre in Belgrade
	Aida	Giuseppe Verdi	High Priest	National Theatre in Belgrade
	Tosca	Giacomo Puccini	A jailer	National Theatre in Belgrade

=== Television ===
Currently Miletić appears in "Gorki plodovi", a drama serie on RTS1.

He has also had previous television roles:

Year	Title	Role	Notes	TV network
1981	Sedam sekretara SKOJ-a		Episode (1.4, 1.5, 1.6)	RTS 1
1983	Kamiondzije 2	Sudija (Judge)	Episode ("Sve ispočetka")	RTS 1
1984	Banjica			RTS 1
1986	Sivi dom			RTS 1
1987	Vuk Karadžić	Miloš Pocerac		RTS 1
1988	Roman o Londonu			RTS 1
1988	Cetrdeset osma - Zavera i izdaja			RTS 1
1989	Drugarica ministarka			RTS 1
1993	Raj			RTS 1
1995	Kraj dinastije Obrenovic			RTS 1
1995	Otvorena vrata			3K
1996	Srecni ljudi 2			RTS 1
1997	Mala skola zivota			3K
1997	Groznica subotnje večeri			RTS 1
1998	Porodicno blago			RTS 1
2001	Porodicno blago 2			RTS 1
2004	Tragom Karadjordja			RTS 1
2004	Jelena			RTV BK Telecom
2004	Stižu dolari			RTS 1
2007	Bela Lađa			RTS 1
2008	Gorki plodovi			RTS 1
2011 - 2012	Cvat lipe na Balkanu			RTS 1
2021	Alexander of Yugoslavia	Dobroslav Jevđević		Nova S

=== Movies ===
Predrag Miletić appeared in the following movies:

Year	Movie	Role	Director
1983	Balkan ekspres (International English title: Balkan Express)	Nemac (German)	Branko Baletić
1983	Karadjordjeva smrt		
1988	Kako zasmejati gospodara	Anto	
1988	Balkan ekspres 2	Nemac (German)	Branko Baletić
1990	Sveto mesto	Nikita	
1999	Morte di una ragazza perbene	Doctor	
2000	Nebeska udica (International English title: Sky Hook)		
2000	Tajna porodicnog blaga		
2002	Saht	Branko	

=== Commercials ===
Predrag Miletić appeared in the following commercials:

Commercials
Cognac No1 (President Scaid)
Dvopek (Swisslion-Takovo)
Nije teško biti fin (RTS)

== See also ==
- Predrag Miletić
