= Gordana Kamenarović =

Serbian actress (born 1958)

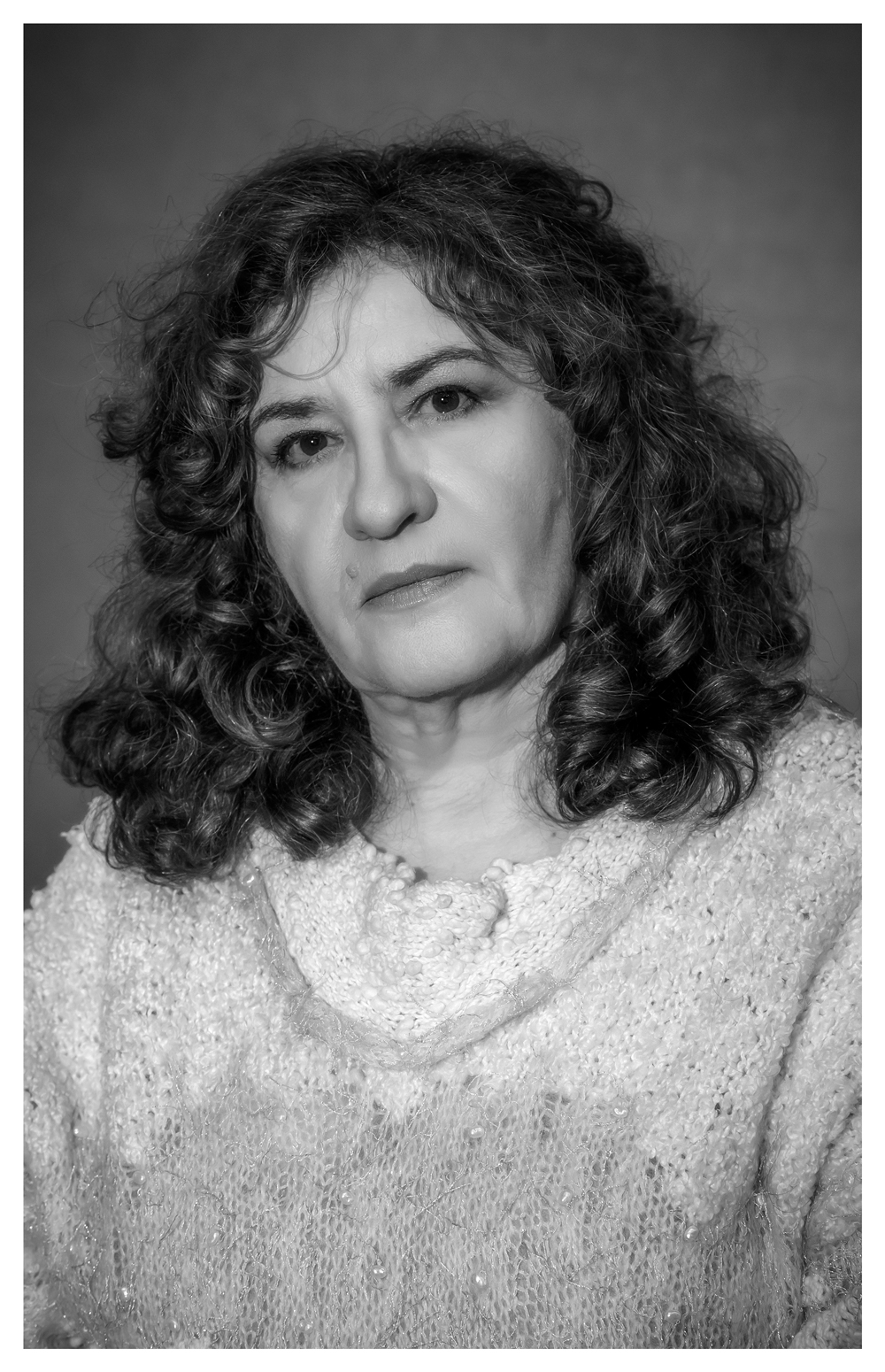
Gordana-Kamenarović

Gordana Kamenarović (born 1958) is a Serbian actress.

== Life ==
Kamenarović was born in Novi Sad, in what was then Yugoslavia, she graduated acting from the Academy of Arts in Novi Sad in 1984, and became a member of the Serbian National Theatre in the same city. She played many roles in the Serbian National Theatre and other theatres, as well as TV dramas, TV series, radio-dramas, featured and short movies.

She is a member of the Association of Dramatic Artists of Vojvodina

== Theatre roles ==
- "Femka from Futog", Migrations, Miloš Crnjanski, director Vida Ognjenović;
- "Mrs. Susic", Ujez, Branislav Nušić, director Radoslav Milenković;
- "First Lady", Zoya's Apartment, Mikhail Bulgakov, director Dejan Mijac;
- "Nellie", The Secret Diary of Virginia Woolf, author and director Milena Pavlovic;
- "Mrs. Lugomirski", Was there a Prince's Supper, author and director Vida Ognjenović;
- "Lydmila", The Oginski Polonaise, Nikolai Koloyada, director Ana Ivanovic;
- "Her Mother", Skocidjevojka, Maja Pelevic, director Kokan Mladenovic;
- "Ana Nikolayeva Antipova", Uncle's Dream, Fyodor Dostoevsky, director Egon Savin;
- "Olga Mitrovic", Too Much of an Inheritance, Vladimir Paskaljevic, director Filip Markovinovic;
- "Yente", Fiddler on the Roof, Jerry Bock / Joseph Stein, director Voja Soldatovic;
- "Renne", The Orchestra, Jean Anouilh, director Voja Soldatovic;
- "Molly", Casanova, David Greig, director Djurdja Tesic;
- "Mir-Jam", Ranjeni orao, Mir-Jam, director Stojan Cerović;
- "Patricia", Extremities, William Mastrosimone, director Aleksandar Gajin;
- "Natalia Sorina", The Sea Gull, Anton Chekhov, director Zanko Tomic;
- "Magda Stepanov", Faith and Treason, Aleksandar Tišma, director Dušan Petrović;
- "Jelena", In the Flame of Passion, Ivan M. Lalic, director Zanko Tomic;
- "Fire Chief", The Bald Soprano, Eugène Ionesco, director Zlatko Paković;
- "Mrs. Bayer", Oxymoron, Svetislav Basara, director Dušan Petrović;
- "Natalia Stepanovna", Half a Century Later, Anton Chekhov, The Proposal + The Bear + The Anniversary, director Ljuboslav Majera;
- "Malcika", Kad bi Sombor bio Holivud, author and director Radoslav Doric;
- "Jagoda", A Miracle in Sargan Ljubomir Simović, director Egon Savin;
- "Savina", Fathers and Forefathers, Slobodan Selenic, director Slavenko Saletovic;
- "Queen Ana", The Bewitched, Peter Barnes, director Goran Vukcevic;
- "Doctor", Urge, Franz Xaver Kroetz, director IvanaVujic;
- "Misyr", King Lear, William Shakespeare, director Ljubisa Ristic;
- "Dove", Druga vrata levo, Aleksandar Popović, director Suada Kapic;
- "Maggie Soldignac", An Absolute Turkey, Georges Feydeau, director Zelimir Oreskovic;
- "Jelena", Deveta defanziva, Stevan Koprivica, director Vladimir Lazić;
- "Masa", Narrentanz, Leo Birinski, director Vida Ognjenović;
- "Natalia", The Petty Bourgeois, Maxim Gorky, director Dr. Vlatko Perkovic;
- "Kaca", Three Hammers (Not to Mention the Sickle) , Deana Leskovar, director Egon Savin;
- "Miss Moon", A Novel about London, Miloš Crnjanski, director Stevo Žigon;
- "Jenny Diver", Bilbao Ball, after "The Beggar's Opera" by Bertolt Brecht, director Zoran Tasic;
- "Ardelia", Zivot provincijskih plejboja izmedju dva rata, Dusan Jovanović, director Branislav Micunovic;
- "Pia", Crime on Goat-Island, Ugo Betti, director Slavenko Saletovic;
- "Carmen", Mela, Dacia Maraini, director Voja Soldatovic;
- "Bertha", Comrades, August Strindberg, director Attila Andrasi;
- "Performer", Cantata Vojvodina, Miroslav Antić, composer Rudolf Bruci, conductor Mladen Jagust;
- "Rosalind", As You Like It, William Shakespeare, director Zlatko Sviben;
- "Maturin", Don Juan, Molière, director Ljubisa Georgijevski;
- "Hermia", A Midsummer Night's Dream, William Shakespeare, director Stevo Žigon;
- "Host", Mario and the Magician, Thomas Mann, director Radoslav Milenković;
- "Aleksandra Ivanovna", Platonov, Anton Chekhov, director Stevo Žigon;
- "Narrator", Captain John Piplfoks, Duško Radović, director Zlatko Sviben;
- "Vladislava Cutukovic", Ravangrad, Veljko Petrović – Djordje Lebovic, director Dejan Mijac;
- "Saveta", Izbiracica, Kosta Trifković, director Slavenko Saletovic;
- "Paulina Tornjanski", Dolnja Zemlja, Jakov Ignjatović – Djordje Lebovic, director Dejan Mijac;
- "Mrs. Stahler", Farmyard, Franz Xaver Kroetz, directors Zlatko Sviben and Milan Pletel;
- "Vida", Slike zalosnih doživljaja, Milica Novkovic, director Slobodan Unkovski;

== Directed for theatre ==
- Mihovil Logar, Pokondirena tikva / A Swank (comic opera), Serbian National Theatre;

== Movies ==
- 2018 – Grande Punto - Proročica
- 2004 – Dobro jutro maligna celijo / Good Morning Malignant Cell (short movie), director Marin Malesevic, Kino klub Novi Sad;
- 2003 – Zvezdan (short movie), director Filip Markovinovic, Kino klub Novi Sad;
- 1998 – Kud plovi ovaj brod / Wanderlust (feature film), director Želimir Žilnik, Terra film, Novi Sad;

== Television ==
- 2019 – Nek ide život (TV series), director Slobodan Šuljagić
- 1987 – Poslednje leto detinjstva (TV series), Rade Obrenovic, director Borivoje Gvojic, TV Novi Sad;
- 1985 – Nas ucitelj IV razreda (TV drama), Veljko Petrović, director Branko Mitic, TV Novi Sad;
- 1984 – Bele udovice / Grass Widows (TV drama), Maja Volk, director Djordje Dedjanski, TV Novi Sad;
- 1984 – Jesen Djure Drazetica (TV movie), Aleksandar Tišma, director Jan Makan TV Novi Sad;
- 1981 – Kir Janja (TV drama), Jovan Sterija Popović, director Dejan Mijac, TV Beograd;

== Awards ==
- The Annual Award of Radio Novi Sad for the season 1982;
- Best actress for the role of "Maturin" in Don Juan at the Vojvodina Theatre Meetings, Pančevo, 1985;
- Best actress for the role of "Natalia Stepanovna" in Half a Century Later at the Vojvodina Theatre Meetings, Sombor, 1994;
- The Annual Award of the Serbian National Theatre for the best achievement in the season 1993/94, for the role of "Natalia Stepanovna" in Half a Century Ago
