= Goran Milev =

Serbian actor, director and producer

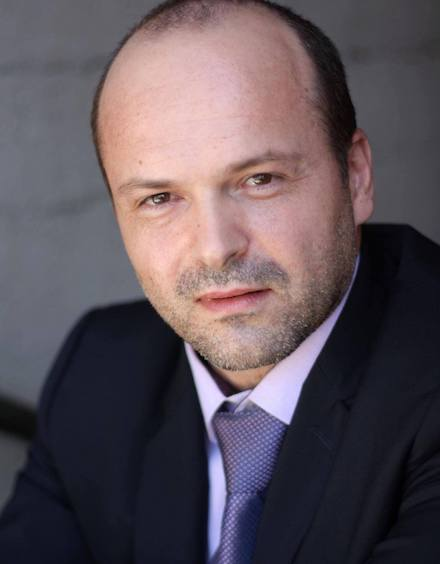
- Photo taken in Hollywood, CA by photographer John Allen Phillips.
- Born: April 26, 1970 (age 56); Niš, SR Serbia, SFR Yugoslavia
- Occupations: Actor, Stage Director and Producer
- Years active: 1986–Present
- Children: 1 (Sofia)

Goran Milev (born April 26, 1970) is a Serbian actor, director, and producer.

== Early life ==
Milev made his acting debut on the stage at age 16, playing the lead role in the acclaimed stage play Grimm's Fairy Tales at the Puppet Theatre of Niš, Serbia. Recognizing his passion for acting in the mid 1990s, he began his career at the National Theatre in Niš (Serbia), while simultaneously emphasizing his studies at the Theatre High School of Acting in Niš, under Professor Mima Vukovic-Kurić. In 1989, he concentrated on his Bachelors of Arts in Acting at the Faculty of Dramatic Arts in Serbia, under Professor Vladimir Jevtović, where he earned his degree in 1993.

== Career ==
Goran Milev made his Chicago debut in 2006 in The Two Headed Pin (monodrama) by Aleksandar Gatalica (Anatol Liberstein), directed by Gorčin Stojanović. Goran later appeared in the 2007 comedy The Seducer by Miladin Ševarlić, and in "Koštana" by Bora Stanković (2008). Following that, he played XX in Emigrants by Slawomir Mrozek (2010), and Stevan Sremac in Zona Zamfirova by Stevan Sremac (2015). Goran has also directed, The Seducer, Koštana, Emigrants, and Zona Zamfirova.

In 2009, he co-founded "Moving Stories Theatre", the ambitious project of two actors and friends Goran Milev & Joe Mack, which specializes in producing plays by renowned European playwrights, rarely performed in the United States. Emigrants by Slawomir Mrozek, successfully premiered in February 2010, as the first play of the season.

He also attended the Steve Scott's (Goodman Theatre) Masters Scene Study in Chicago in 2009.

Goran has also been featured in short movies, I'm Ready to Change (Father), directed by Muamer Celik in 2016, and Revolution, directed by Angela Liu in 2012. In 2009, he played Professor Brayer in Periods of Rain, directed by Jason Blackwell. Other recent film acting credits include Ivko's Feast (Jordan) in 2005, Nataša (Inspector) in 2002, and Fire and Nothing (Poet Branko Miljković) in 1995.

Goran Milev has appeared in several television series. In 2004, he appeared in the historical drama Tragom Karadjordja (Milan Obrenović), directed by Miroslav Zivanović, and Karadjordje i Pozoriste (Leader Petar Dobrnjac), directed by Duda Ćeramilac and produced by Radio Television of Serbia. He played Miloš Crnjanski in "Pesničke Vedrine", directed by Miroslav Zupanc. In 2005 he played Sava Sumanović and Milan Grol both directed by Ramadan Demirović along with many other roles in editions of Umetničke Večeri.

Other recent TV acting credits include "Mješoviti Brak" (Konobar and Trener) and "Jelena" (Novinar).

Goran wrote, produced and directed two documentaries: Babylon and "Light Painting". The documentary film Light Painting premiered on Serbian National Television, RTS, on October 18, 2014.

Milev was a member of the Belgrade Drama Theatre, (1997-2006) (Serbian: Beogradsko dramsko pozorište, Београдско драмско позориште, abbreviated BDP), member of the National Theatre Nis,(1993–97), (Serbian: Народно позориште у Нишу / Narodno Pozorište u Nišu). He has also worked with Slavija Theatre, Atelje 212 Belgrade, and Puppet Theatre of Niš.

Other recent acting credits include Vila Sachino (General Sreckovic) by Goran Marković, directed by Milan Karadzić; 24 Zida (Georgije) by Igor Marojević, directed by Žanko Tomić; One Never Knows (Boone) by Bernard Shaw, directed by Miroslav Belović; All My Sons (Frankie) by Arthur Miller, directed by Miroslav Jovanović; The Return of Don Juan (Don Juan) by Aleksandar Obrenović, directed by Kokan Mladenović; The Seducer (painter Darko Raspopović) written and directed by Miladin Sevarlić; Prometheus Bound (Prometheus) by Aeschylus and Antigone (Creon) by Sophocles, both directed by Marislav Radisavljević; Fool for Love (Eddie), directed by Kokan Mladenović; The Sea Gull (Treplieff), directed by Branko Stavrev; Koštana (Stojan), directed by Zaga Micunović; Zora na Istoku (Djura), directed by Arsa Milosević.

In addition to his acting and directing work, Goran Milev launched his own production company, GM Films in 2012 in Los Angeles, CA. His abilities span development, business affairs, physical production and film sales.

Goran is also deeply passionate about music and has released his single Artwork, available on major digital music platforms including Spotify, Apple Music, iTunes, Amazon Music, Pandora, and others.

== Selected filmography ==
=== Film ===
Year	Title	Role	Notes
1993	Fire and Nothing	poet Branko Miljković	Feature film
2001	Nataša	Mupovac	Drama, Action
2005	Ivko's Feast	Jordan	Comedy
2010	Periods of Rain	Professor Breyer	Feature film
2012	Revolution	Interrogator	Short film
In Development	Maroon Protocol	Writer, Producer	Feature film
In Development	Life After Anna	Co-writer, Producer	Feature film
2015	I Am Ready to Change	Father	Short film
2024	Sleep No More	Executive Producer	Feature film

=== Television ===
Year	Title	Role	Notes
2003	"M(j)esoviti brak"	Konobar	TV series
2004	"Tragom Karadjordja"'	Milan Obrenović	TV series
2004	Karadjordje i Pozorište	Dobrnjac	TV series
2012	A Father and His Icon	Producer, director	Documentary film
2016	Babylon	Producer, director	Documentary film
2022	Design Therapy	Producer, director	TV Series
