= Goran (Slavic name) =

- Gender: Male
- Language: Slavic

Origin
- Origin: Slavic
- Meaning: Woodsman; Man from the mountains Highlander

Other names
- Alternative spelling: Cyrillic: Горан
- Nickname: Gogi
- Related names: female form Gorana
- See also: Gordan

Goran (pronounced [ɡǒran]; Cyrillic: Горан) is a Slavic male first name, mostly used in south Slavic countries such as Croatia, Serbia, North Macedonia, Montenegro and Bosnia and Herzegovina.

Goran is a Slavic, pre-Christian name, meaning "highlander" or a mountain-man, someone who lives in the mountains. Hence, Goran in Slavic tradition would mean someone who enjoys and values life in the mountains.

In former Yugoslavia, Mladi Gorani was a Yugoslav Youth Organization tasked with re-foresting Yugoslav highlands.

== Variations ==
Nicknames and cognomen include Gogi [ɡoɡi], Gogo [ɡoːɡo], Goca [ɡotsa]

- female Gorana (Горана)
- female Goranka (Горанка)

== Name day ==
- February 24 in the Roman Catholic Calendar
- July 31 in the Serbian Orthodox Calendar

== Notable people ==
- Goran Bogdanović (politician) (born 1963), Serbian politician
- Goran Bogdanović (footballer born 1967), retired Serbian footballer
- Goran Bregović, Bosnian musician and composer
- Goran Bunjevčević, retired Serbian footballer
- Goran Dragić, Slovene basketball player
- Goran Đorović, retired Serbian footballer
- Goran Cvijanović, Slovenian football player
- Goran Čolak, Croatian free diver, World champion and World record holder
- Goran Gavrančić, Serbian footballer
- Goran Hadžić, Serbian politician in Croatia accused of crimes against humanity
- Goran Ivanišević, Croatian tennis player, 2001 Wimbledon Champion
- Goran Jevtić (actor), Serbian actor and director
- Goran Jurić, Croatian and Yugoslavian international footballer
- Goran Karan, Croatian pop singer
- Goran Klemenčič (born 1972), Slovenian lawyer
- Ivan Goran Kovačić, Croatian poet
- Goran Marić (footballer) (born 1984), Serbian footballer
- Goran Marić (volleyball) (born 1981), Serbian volleyball player
- Goran Milev, Serbian actor
- Goran Obradović (disambiguation), several people
- Goran Pandev, Macedonian football player
- Goran Popov, Macedonian footballer
- Goran Sablić, Croatian footballer
- Goran Senjanović, Croatian physicist
- Goran Slavkovski, Macedonian-Swedish footballer
- Goran Sukno, Yugoslav Croatian water polo player
- Goran Suton, Bosnian-Croat-American basketball player
- Goran Višnjić, Croatian actor
- Goran Vlaović, Croatian footballer
- Goran Vujović, Montenegrin actor
- Goran Vuković, Serbian gangster
