= Georgi M. Unkovski =

Macedonian director (born 1988)

- Георги М. Унковски
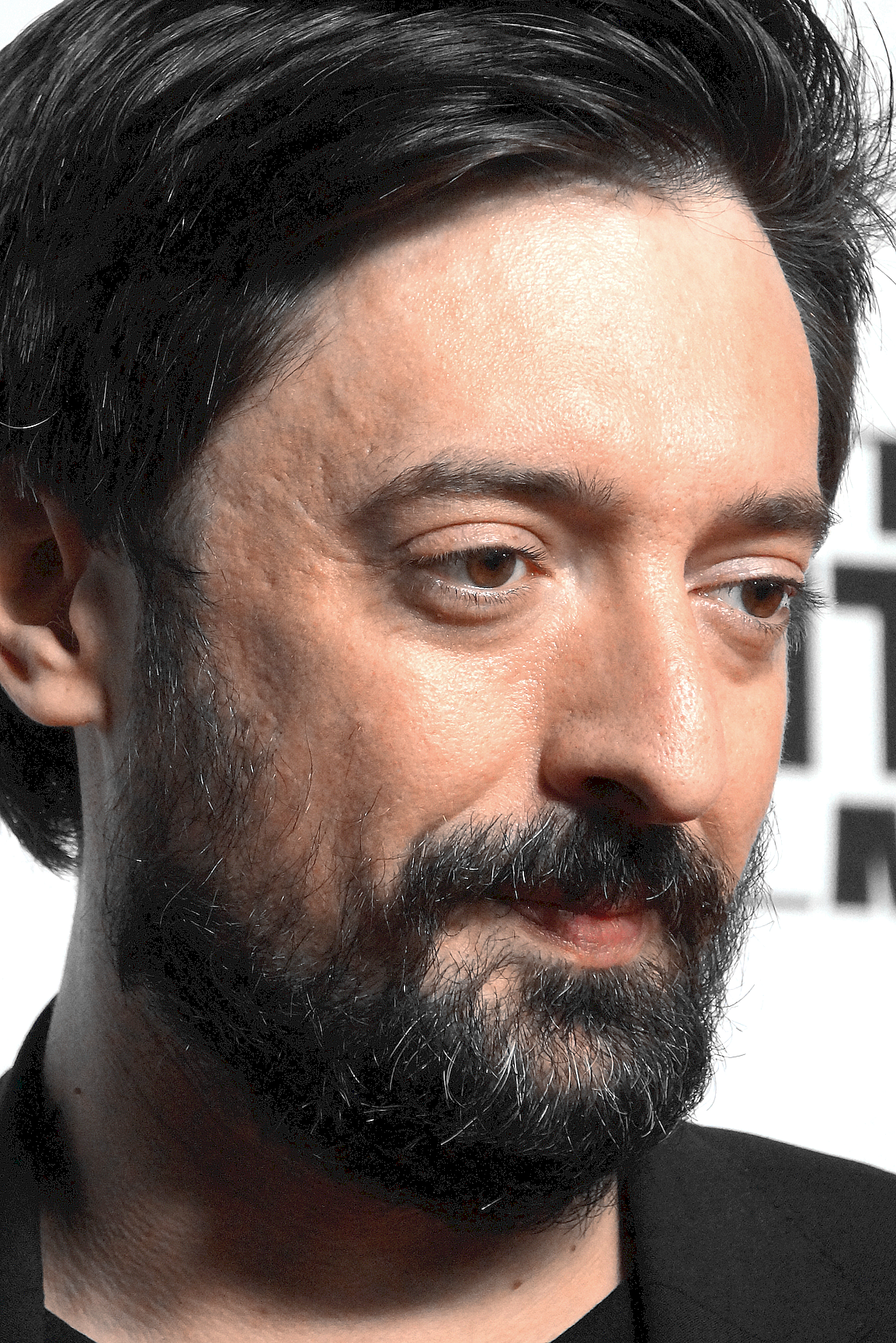
- Unkovski at Film Fest Gent in 2025
- Born: 1988 (age 37–38); New York City, United States
- Citizenship: North Macedonia
- Education: Rochester Institute of Technology; FAMU
- Occupation: Director
- Years active: 2019–present
- Known for: Sticker; DJ Ahmet
- Father: Slobodan Unkovski

Georgi M. Unkovski (Macedonian: Георги М. Унковски; born 1988) is a Macedonian film director. Born in the United States and raised in North Macedonia, he studied filmmaking at the Film and TV School of the Academy of Performing Arts in Prague before returning to North Macedonia, where he directed episodes of the comedy series Prespav. Both Unkovski's debut short film, Sticker (2019), and debut feature-length film, DJ Ahmet (2025), premiered at the Sundance Film Festival, where the latter won an Audience Award and a Special Jury Prize.

== Early life and education ==
Unkovski was born in New York City, United States, and raised in what was then Yugoslavia and later the Former Yugoslav Republic of Macedonia. His father, Slobodan Unkovski, is a Macedonian theatre director and academic. After completing his education, he returned to the United States to study photography at the Rochester Institute of Technology. Unkovski went on to study filmmaking at the Film and TV School of the Academy of Performing Arts in Prague, Czech Republic; during his time there, he directed over ten student films, including the comedy short Pepi i Muto (2015).

== Career ==
After graduating, Unkovski moved to Skopje, where he directed episodes of the television series Prespav. In 2019, he filmed the short film Sticker, a satire following a single father struggling to deal with Macedonian bureaucracy. The film premiered at the Sundance Film Festival in 2020.

In 2020, Unkovski began writing what would become his feature length debut, DJ Ahmet, based on a mental image of a shepherd entering a forest and stumbling across a rave. Filming began in late 2023 after funding was received; in addition to a grant of 380, 000 MKD from the Macedonian Film Agency, support was also provided from Cinema Futura and Sektor Film in North Macedonia; Bekum and Baš Čelik Production in Serbia; and Analog Vision in the Czech Republic. DJ Ahmet was filmed over 36 days in late 2023 in Kodžalija, Ali Koč and Skopje, and follows a 15-year-old Yörük boy struggling falling in love in rural North Macedonia while aspiring to become a DJ. Taking place primarily in Turkish, it was called the first film about Yörüks to actively involve the group in the film's production.

DJ Ahmet premiered on 23 January 2025 at the Sundance Film Festival, where it won the Audience Award in the World Cinema Competition, in addition to the Special Jury Prize for Creative Vision. It had its European premiere at the Sarajevo Film Festival, and won awards at the Seattle International Film Festival, Seville European Film Festival, Braunschweig International Film Festival and the Herceg Novi Film Festival, as well as screening at the Sydney Film Festival and the British Film Institute. DJ Ahmet premiered in North Macedonia in October 2025, and became the fourth most popular film of 2025.

In 2025, Unkovski served as a mentor for the Talents Sarajevo programme at the 2025 Sarajevo Film Festival.

As of 2026, Unkovski is writing a musical film about pirates. The film, titled Kralot na gjubreto (Macedonian: Кралот на ѓубрето, lit. 'The Garbage King'), received 30 million MKD of funding from the Macedonian Film Agency.
