= Vlajić =

Vlajić is a Slavic surname. Notable people with the surname include:

- Đorđe Vlajić (born 1977), Serbian football manager and player
- Gordana Vlajić (born 1959), Serbian author and political activist
