= GOCA =

GOCA can refer to the following:

- Gallery of Contemporary Art is the name of multiple fine art galleries
- Genuine Orthodox Church of America
- Georgia Ovarian Cancer Alliance, an Atlanta-based group promoting Ovarian cancer awareness among women
- Gigabit over Coax Access, a network technology based on the Multimedia over Coax Alliance standard
- Global Offset and Countertrade Association, a Washington D. C. non-profit organization to promote world trade
- Global Outreach Charter Academy is a school in Jacksonville, Florida
- GPS-based online Control and Alarm System is a system for monitoring movement in three dimensions, developed by the Karlsruhe Institute of Technology
- Graphics Object Content Architecture, a format for vector-graphics objects in MODCA
- Greater Olney Civic Association, an umbrella civic association for Olney, Maryland
- Guaranteed Organic Certification Agency, USDA-accredited organic certification organization

Goca may refer to:

- Goca (nickname)
