= Sinđelić =

Sinđelić (Serbian: Синђелић) may refer to:

- "Sinđelić" Theatre or National Theatre in Niš, Serbia
- FK Sinđelić Beograd, football club from the city of Belgrade, Serbia
- FK Sinđelić Niš, football club from the city of Niš, Serbia
- Stevan Sinđelić (1770–1809), military commander in the Serbian Revolutionary Army
