= Balkan Express =

Balkan Express may refer to

- Balkan Express (train) - A former international train service between Istanbul and Belgrade and formerly Budapest.
  - Balkan (train) - The shortened remnant of the Balkan Express operating between Sofia and Belgrade.
- Balkan Express (film) - A 1983 Yugoslavian film, directed by Branko Baletić.
