= Duboćke =

- Village
- Location within Montenegro
- Coordinates: 42.9247°N 18.6533°E
- Country: Montenegro
- Municipality: Nikšić

Population (2011)
  - Total: 194
- Time zone: UTC+1 (CET)
  - Summer (DST): UTC+2 (CEST)

Duboćke (Serbian Cyrillic: Дубоћке) is an area in the municipality of Nikšić, Montenegro.

== Demographics ==
According to the 2011 census, its population was 194.

Ethnicity in 2011
Ethnicity	Number	Percentage
Montenegrins	112	57.7%
Serbs	75	38.7%
other/undeclared	7	3.6%
Total	194	100%

== Notable individuals ==
- Vida Ognjenović
