= Gordan =

Gordan (Cyrillic: Гордан) is a Slavic name derived Proto-Slavic *gъrdъ (gȏrd) meaning "proud".

== Given name ==
Gordan
- Gender: Мale
- Language: Slavic

Origin
- Origin: Slavic

Other names
- Alternative spelling: Cyrillic: Гордан
- Related names: female form Gordana
- See also: Goran

- Gordan Golik, Croatian football midfielder
- Gordan Giriček, Croatian basketball player
- Gordan Jandroković, Croatian diplomat and politician
- Gordan Lederer, Croatian war journalist
- Gordan Kičić, Serbian actor, comedian and director
- Gordan Nikolitch, Serbian violinist
- Gordan Petrić, Serbian footballer
- Gordan Vidović, Belgian footballer

== Surname ==
- Paul Gordan, German mathematician
- Shahab Gordan, Iranian footballer

== See also ==
- Gordana
- Goran
- Gordon
