= Sticker (film) =

2019 short film by Georgi M. Unkovski

- Film Poster
- Directed by: Georgi M. Unkovski
- Written by: Georgi M. Unkovski
- Produced by: Ivan Unkovski
- Starring: Sashko Kocev; Xhevdet Jashari; Moni Damevski; Ljupcho Todorovski
- Cinematography: Naum Doksevski
- Production company: Cinema Futura
- Distributed by: Salaud Morisset
- Release date: 2019
- Running time: 19 minutes
- Country: North Macedonia
- Language: Macedonian

Sticker is a short film directed by Georgi M. Unkovski in 2019.

In 2020, it was premiered at Sundance Film Festival and won the Best Narrative Short Prize at Brooklyn Film Festival. Moreover, it was amongst the nominees at Palm Springs International ShortFest.

Sticker was produced by Ivan Unkovski (Cinema Futura) and distributed worldwide by the International Production & Distribution company Salaud Morisset.

== Plot ==
Dejan, a young father, only wants to make it on time to his daughter's school play. But the entire Macedonian administrative bureaucracy seems to have decided otherwise.

== Awards ==
Since its launch, the film has been selected in more than 150 festivals around the world.

Year	Festival	Award/Category	Status
2020	Sundance Film Festival	Short Film Grand Jury Prize	Nominated
2020	Palm Springs International ShortFest	Best of the Festival	Nominated
2020	Prague International Indie Film Festival	Best Foreign Short	Won
2020	In The Palace International Short Film Festival	Best Fiction Film – Oscars Qualifying Award	Won
2020	Brooklyn Film Festival	Best Narrative Short	Won
2020	Calgary International Film Festival	Best Live Action Short Film	Nominated
2020	El Gouna Film Festival	Golden Star – Short Films Competition	Nominated
2020	HollyShorts Film Festival	Official Selection Film	Nominated
2020	Princeton Independent Film Festival	Best Production Design	Won
2020	Tirana International Film Festival	Best Student Film	Nominated
2020	Manhattan Short Film Festival	Silver Medal – Best Film	Won
2020	La Guarimba International Film Festival	Best Fiction Short Film	Nominated
2020	Moscow International Film Festival	Shorts Official Selection	Nominated
2020	Literally Short Film Festival	Best Picture	Won
2020	San Francisco Independent Short Film Festival	Jury Prize – Best Short Film	Won
2020	World of Film International Festival Glasgow	Festival Prize – Best Short Film	Nominated
2020	Les Arcs Film Festival	Best Short Film	Nominated
2020	Aix-en-Provence Festival Tous Courts	International Competition	Nominated
