= The Journal of Čarnojević =

The Journal of Carnojevic is a lyrical novel by Miloš Crnjanski, which was first published in 1920. The narrator of the novel is Petar Rajic, who tells his story in which there is no clearly established narrative flow, nor are events connected by cause and effect.
