= Branko Miljković =

Serbian poet

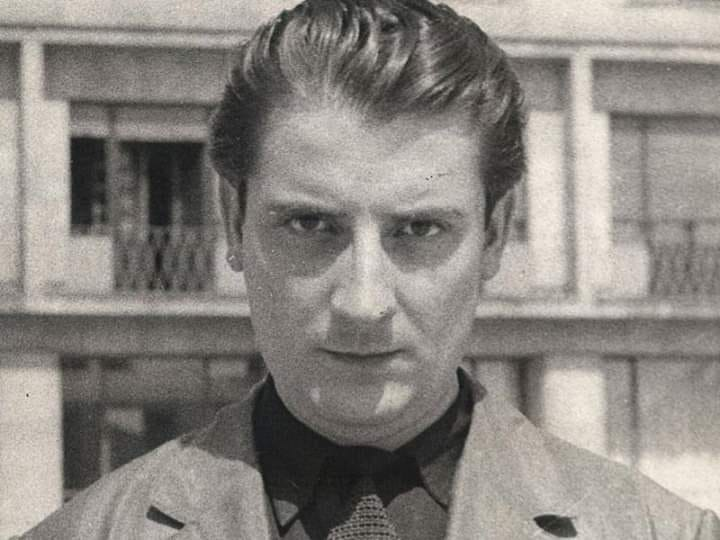
- Born: 29 January 1934; Niš, Kingdom of Yugoslavia
- Died: 12 February 1961 (aged 27); Zagreb, PR Croatia, FPR Yugoslavia
- Resting place: New Cemetery, Belgrade
- Education: University of Belgrade
- Occupation: Poet
- Years active: 1952–1961

Branko Miljković (Serbian Cyrillic: Бранко Миљковић; 29 January 1934 – 12 February 1961) was a Serbian poet.

== Biography ==
Miljković was born in Niš to a Serb father Gligorije Miljković, who hails from Gadžin Han, and a Croat mother Marija Brailo, who hails from Trbounje near Drniš.

He was best known throughout Yugoslavia, the Soviet Union and other countries of the Eastern Bloc for his influential writings. At a time when no one could have foreseen anything but a bright future for the poet, he died prematurely in 1961 at the age of 27. He was found hanging from a tree in Zagreb, today's Croatia. This controversial incident was officially recorded as a suicide.

Miljković was also a member of the Society of Writers and Literary Translators of Niš, a cultural organization in his hometown that brought together prominent local authors and translators, and in whose journal Gledišta he published some of his earliest poems in 1953.

In his one-line poem "Epitaph", he writes "Ubi me prejaka reč" ("Killed by a word too strong") almost sensing his premature end of life. During the last years of his life, he published five books of poetry (I Wake Her in Vain, Death against Death, The Origin of Hope, Fire and Nothing, The Shining Blood, criticism, and translations of the French Symbolists and Russian poet Osip Mandelstam. He continues to influence poets to this day.

== Legacy ==
A biopic about Miljković's life and poetry Vatra i ništa ('Fire and Nothing') was produced in 1995. It was written and directed by Marislav Radisavljević, and produced by Ivan Zdravković. Goran Milev played the role of Branko Miljković.

He is sometimes called "the Serbian prince of poetry". In 2024, several of his poems were included in Buenos Aires Poetry n°1, in Serbian, English and Spanish.

== Works ==
- Uzalud je budim, Belgrade, 1957
- Smrću protiv smrti, (co-written with Blažo Šćepanović), Belgrade, 1959
- Vatra i ništa, Belgrade, 1960
- Poreklo nade, Zagreb, 1960
- Krv koja svetli, Belgrade, 1961
