= Sumatraism =

Sumatraism is an avant-garde art movement created by Serbian writer Miloš Crnjanski. Crnjanski had set the principles of Sumatraism during World War I, and proclaimed it in his 1920 text Explanation of Sumatra.

Crnjanski based Sumatraism on the influence of Expressionism and Futurism, introducing his vision of cosmic harmony. His concept included the most important topics of contemporary avant-garde art: primal force, the conflict between civilization and nature, and the hope for a new beginning.
