= Gorana =

- Gender: Female
- Language: Slavic

Origin
- Origin: Slavic
- Meaning: "mountain woman", "tall woman"

Other names
- Alternative spelling: Serbian Cyrillic: Горана
- Variant form: Goranka
- Nickname: Goca
- Related names: male form Goran
- See also: Gordana

Gorana (Serbian Cyrillic: Горана) is a Slavic female given name, meaning "mountain woman" or "woman from the highlands" (see male form Goran). The nickname is Goca.

People

- Gorana Matić (born 1973), a Croatian tennis player that played for Yugoslavia and Croatia.
