= Goran Stefanovski =

Macedonian dramatist, screenwriter, essayist, lecturer (1952–2018)

- Горан Стефановски
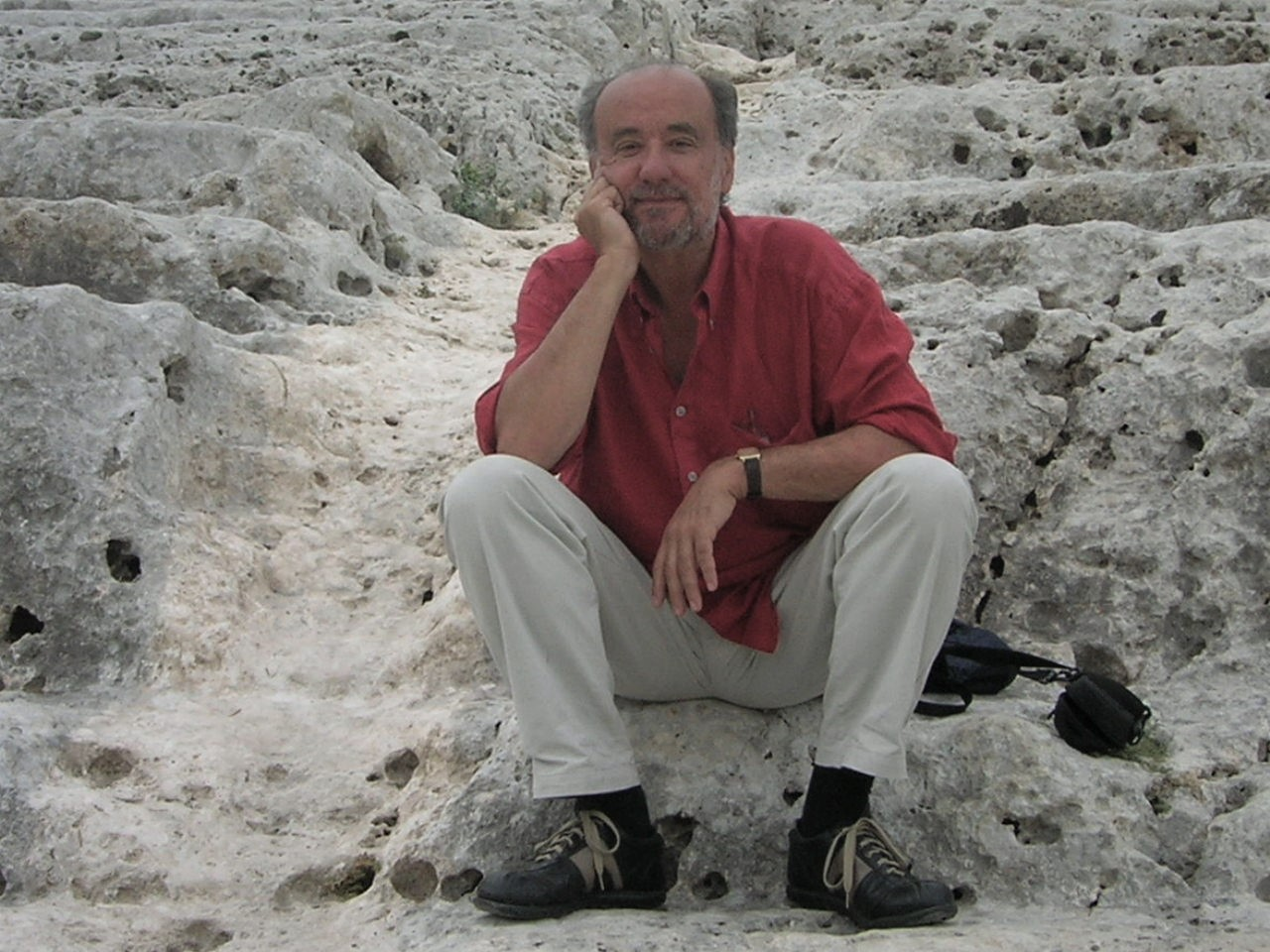
- Stefanovski in 2006
- Born: 27 April 1952; Bitola, SR Macedonia
- Died: 27 November 2018 (aged 66); Ashford, Kent, England
- Occupations: Dramatist, screenwriter, essayist, lecturer and public intellectual
- Relatives: Vlatko Stefanovski (brother)

Goran Stefanovski (Macedonian: Горан Стефановски; 27 April 1952 – 27 November 2018) was a leading Macedonian dramatist, screenwriter, essayist, lecturer and public intellectual. He wrote for the theatre, television and film, as well as pursuing a long academic career in teaching creative writing for the theatre and film.

Stefanovski is best known for his second play "Wild Flesh" (Диво месо), which won the 1980 Sterijino Pozorje Theatre Festival Award for Best Yugoslav Play of the Year and the same year earned him the 11th October Prize, the highest award of what was then the Republic of Macedonia. He wrote 23 full-length plays for the theatre in all. The most widely performed internationally are "Wild Flesh" (Диво месо), "Hi-Fi", "Flying on the Spot" (Лет во место), "Tattooed Souls" (Тетовирани души), "The Black Hole" (Црна дупка), "Chernodrinski Comes Back Home" (Чернодрински се враќа дома), "Sarajevo, an oratorio for the theatre", "Hotel Europa", and "The Demon of Debar Maalo" (Демонот од Дебар маало).

Born into a theatre family in Bitola, then in Yugoslavia, on 27 April 1952, Stefanovski had his first play performed at the age of 22. After the fall of Yugoslavia, he spent eight years commuting between what had become the Republic of Macedonia, the UK and Sweden, before settling in the UK in 2000. He had dual Macedonian/UK citizenship.

Stefanovski's work dealt with issues of migration, post-communist transition and identity, as well as what it means to be human.

== Early years ==
Goran Stefanovski was born on 27 April 1952 in Bitola, a town then in Yugoslavia, near the border with Greece on the Balkan Peninsula in Eastern Europe. His father, Mirko, was a theatre director and his mother, Nada, a leading actress. Much of Goran's childhood was spent in theatres. His younger brother is Vlatko Stefanovski (Влатко Стефановски), a well-known virtuoso guitarist.

Having fallen in love with all things English during his teenage years through the influence of the Beatles and the Rolling Stones, Goran went on to study English language and literature at the University of Skopje. However, he could not get the theatre out of his system and spent his third year of studies at the Faculty of Dramatic Arts (FDU) in Belgrade. He graduated as the best student of his generation in Skopje and took a job in the Drama Department of TV Skopje, although he was soon to return to the University to teach English literature, with a particular focus on Shakespeare.

In October 1974 he met Pat Marsh, an English linguist who came to teach English at Skopje University. They married in March 14, 1976. When they met, he was writing a play based on Macedonian folklore for Slobodan Unkovski (Слободан Унковски), one of the directors of a theatre group he had become involved with as a student; Unkovski was to become a lifetime collaborator and friend. Yané Zadrogaz (Јане Задрогаз) achieved great success and went on to be presented at the Belgrade International Theatre Festival (BITEF), then in Paris and finally at the Caracas Theatre Festival in Venezuela.

== Life and work ==
A radio play about Shakespeare, two TV plays with a contemporary setting, and a six-part TV series set in the 1940s followed Goran Stefanovski's early success in the second half of the 1970s. In 1979 he wrote his best-known play, Wild Flesh (Диво месо), which has had fifteen productions to date all over Europe, including London, and is on the secondary school curriculum in his homeland. The play is based on the experiences of his father and uncles during World War II. It brought him the October Prize of the Republic of Macedonia for exceptional artistic achievement, the highest award of the Republic, as well as the 1980 Award for Best Yugoslav Play of the Year at the Sterijino Pozorje Theatre Festival and was performed at the Belgrade International Theatre Festival.

Two years later, Flying on the Spot (Лет во место) had its first production, a play which dealt with the fraught Macedonian Question of the late nineteenth century and the identity of the nation.

Almost every year for the next thirty-three years was to see a new and successful play by Goran Stefanovski. In the 1980s he continually pushed the boundaries of Yugoslav theatre, both in an artistic and political sense. The False Bottom (1983) (Дупло дно) was particularly bold in its challenge to state censors. In 1988 The Black Hole (Црна дупка) received its first productions; with its unique structure and stunning theatricality, it was considered to be an important contribution to European theatre.

1985 marked a departure for the dramatist into a TV serial for children, The Crazy Alphabet (Бушава азбука), each episode teaching one of the 31 letters of the Macedonian alphabet through a combination of animation and sketches. Stefanovski's son, Igor, had been born in 1980 and his daughter, Jana, was to be born in 1986. That year he founded the playwriting department at the Faculty of Dramatic Arts in Skopje, where he was a full professor until 1998.

In 1987, Stefanovski wrote the first version of a screenplay for film director, Stolé Popov (Столе Попов), dealing with the aftermath of the catastrophic 1903 Ilinden Uprising against Ottoman rule. This film, To the Hilt (До балчак), was not to be made until 2014, after it had been through two revisions, but it was the first of six screenplays Stefanovski was to write and began his involvement with film.

In 1990, he took his family to Providence, Rhode Island, USA, where he spent six months as Outstanding Artist Fulbright Scholar at Brown University and began a lifelong friendship with Professor John Emigh.

In 1991, Yugoslavia began to fall apart and descended into civil war. The constantly deteriorating situation led his wife Pat to decide to make a new life for the family in Canterbury, England, from September 1992. For the next six years, Stefanovski was to commute between his homeland and the UK, continuing his teaching in Skopje.

In 1992, Dragan Klaić, one of Goran's former teachers at the Belgrade Faculty of Dramatic Arts and a close friend, put him in touch with Chris Torch of the Jordcirkus theatre group in Stockholm, who commissioned a play, in cooperation with the Antwerp European Capital of Culture, about Sarajevo, the Bosnian city then undergoing a brutal siege. Sarajevo, an oratorio for the theatre went on an extensive tour across Europe in the summer of 1993, including the London International Festival of Theatre and the Kampnagel International Summer Festival in Hamburg. Sarajevo was published in London, New York, and Illinois. This successful venture was followed by performance scripts for the festivals of European Capitals of Culture in Copenhagen, Stockholm, Avignon, and Bologna, all in collaboration with Chris Torch.

Through this connection, Stefanovski had become known in Sweden and between 1998 and 2000 he was a visiting professor at the Swedish Institute of Dramatic Art in Stockholm. The Institute published his A Little Book of Traps (a scriptwriting tool) in 2002. It has been translated and published in five languages, including Chinese. By this time, Stefanovski had become used to writing in English and only later translating his work into his mother tongue.

In September 2000, he settled in Canterbury and taught classes in screenwriting and playwriting at the University of Kent before taking up his post at Canterbury Christ Church University in 2002, teaching screenwriting there until his death in 2018.

Stefanovski continued writing successful plays which were translated and produced all over the world throughout the rest of his life. In 2004 Everyman played at the Riverside Studios in Hammersmith and on tour with Theatre Mélange. Perhaps the most notable of his later plays were his two adaptations of Ancient Greek texts, Bacchanalia after Euripides' The Bacchae and Odysseus after Homer's Odyssey. Both had clear references to the Yugoslav wars and their aftermath. Several of his post-war plays "approach from different angles themes like alienation, wandering and home-longing, experimenting, at the same time, with the itinerant performance, aimed to explore a labyrinthine space".

== Death ==
Goran Stefanovski died of an inoperable brain tumour in 2018 at the age of 66.

== Political views ==
Goran Stefanovski was born and brought up under the communist regime in Yugoslavia. While doing his military service in 1977-78 he was made a member of the Yugoslav Communist Party and assigned to teach classes in Marxism to his fellow conscripts. Particularly during communist times, he walked a tightrope between approval and disapproval by the powers-that-be. His views on political events were still constantly sought after the fall of communism. In the last year of his life, he wrote: "I'm not a politician. It's not my responsibility to take a side and have a prepared position on every issue. I'm a playwright. I'm interested in both the voice of the angel and the voice of the devil. I sympathise both with the darkest on the Right and the brightest on the Left".

== Academic research and teaching ==
Goran Stefanovski also had a long academic career in his homeland and in the UK. From 1975 to 1977 he did postgraduate studies at the Faculty of Philology, University of Belgrade, specialising in Literature Studies, and was awarded an MA in 1979 after presentation of his dissertation entitled "Stage Directions as the Foundation of the Theatre of Samuel Beckett".

For the 1979–1980 academic year he did research on contemporary British drama and Edward Bond at the University of Manchester, UK, with a 10-month scholarship from The British Council. This was to have led to a doctoral degree, but Stefanovski never completed it as creative writing came to hold a central position in his life and claimed the bulk of his time outside university teaching, which was his full-time career from 1978 onwards.

He taught a survey of English Literature with a strong emphasis on Shakespeare and Drama from 1978 to 1986 in the Department of English Language and Literature at the University of Skopje. From 1986 to 1995 he was an assistant professor at the Faculty of Dramatic Arts, University of Skopje, and Head of the Playwriting Department, teaching Creative Playwriting, Theory of Drama and History of Drama – Shakespeare course. In the Spring semester of 1990, he was Fulbright Outstanding Artist Scholar at Brown University, Providence, Rhode Island, USA, and taught an Introduction to Dramatic Writing in the Department of Theatre, Speech and Dance there.

He was promoted to Full Professor in his post in Skopje in 1995 and remained at the Faculty of Dramatic Arts until 1998. From 1998 to 2000 he was Visiting Professor at the Dramatic Institute, Stockholm, Sweden. Stefanovski then taught screenwriting and playwriting classes in the Departments of Film and Drama at the University of Kent at Canterbury, UK, between 2000 and 2002, before taking up the post he held until his death in 2018 as Senior Lecturer in Scriptwriting in the Department of Media and Art at Canterbury Christ Church University in 2002.

His A Little Book of Traps (a scriptwriting tool), published by Dramatic Institute in Stockholm in 2002, encapsulates his approach to playwriting and screenwriting as a craft which can be taught. He was to develop this in various papers and essays.

Stefanovski contributed papers to a large number of conferences and held workshops all over Europe. He reported on his practice-based research of scriptwriting and also on his research into issues of identity and cultural history, politics and policies.

His last public lecture was as keynote speaker at the International Federation for Theatre Research World Congress in Belgrade in July 2018. His last public appearance was to receive an honorary doctorate from the Krastyo Sarafov National Academy for Theatre and Film Arts in Sofia.

== Full-length theatre plays ==
- Јане Задрогаз – 1974 ("Yané Zadrogaz")
- Диво месо – 1979 ("Wild Flesh", originally translated as "Proud Flesh")
- Лет во место – 1981 ("Flying on the Spot")
- Хај-Фај – 1982 ("Hi-Fi")
- Дупло дно – 1984 ("The False Bottom")
- Тетовирани души – 1985 ("Tattooed Souls")
- Црна дупка – 1987 ("The Black Hole")
- Лонг плеј – 1988 ("Long Play")
- Кула вавилонска – 1989 ("Shades of Babel")
- Чернодрински се враќа дома – 1991 ("Chernodrinski comes back home")
- Sarajevo, an oratorio for the theatre – 1993
- Баханалии – 1996 ("Bacchanalia")
- Casabalkan – 1997
- Euralien – 1998
- Tales of a City – 1998
- Hotel Europa – 2000
- The Hague – 2000
- Everyman – 2002
- Демонот од Дебар маало – 2006 ("The Demon of Debar Maalo")
- Пусти то – 2010 ("Let it go")
- Odisej – 2012 ("Odysseus")
- Огнени јазици – 2013 ("Tongues of Fire")
- Figurae Veneris Historiae – 2014

Most of Goran Stefanovski's plays for the theatre were published in Macedonian in the four volumes of Собрани драми, Табернакул, Skopje ISBN 9989-937-21-4 (Книга прва – 2002: Јане Задрогаз, Диво месо, Лет во место, Хај-Фај, Дупло дно, Тетовирани души; ISBN 9989-937-22-2 (Книга втора – 2002: Црна дупка, Лонг плеј, Кула вавилонска, Чернодрински се враќа дома, Сараево, Баханалии, Kaзaбaлкан); ISBN 978-608-210-149-1 (Книга трета – 2010: Гоце, Екс-ју, Евроалиен, Хотел Eвропа, Жив чоек, Духот на слободата, Демонот од Дебар Mаало, Остави тоа!); ISBN 978-608-210-416-4 (Книга четврта – 2015: Одисеј, Огнени јазици, Figurae Veneris Historiae). These editions are now out of print.

Now available in Macedonian:

- Горан Стефановски : Избрани драми ("Диво месо", "Лет во место", "Хај-фај", "Дупло дно", "Баханлии", и "Демонот од Дебар Маало") Polica, Трето издание, 2022 ISBN 978-608-4850-99-1
- Горан Стефановски, Диво месо, Издавачки центар Три, Skopje, 2023 ISBN 978-608-2309-24-8

== Plays available in translation ==
=== In English ===
- 4 by Stefanovski and a 1 act (Wild Flesh, The False Bottom, Tattooed Souls, Casabalkan, Ex-Yu) with introductory texts by Chris Torch and Slobodan Unkovski and translations by Patricia Marsh-Stefanovska, Laertes Egret Playwrights, Chapel Hill, North Carolina, 2025 ISBN 978-1-942281-36-8
- Five Plays (The Black Hole, Shades of Babel, Sarajevo, Odysseus, Figurae Veneris Historiae) translated by Patricia Marsh-Stefanovska, The Conrad Press, 2019 ISBN 978-1-911546-62-7
- Selected Plays (Flying on the Spot, The False Bottom, Wild Flesh) – Translation Project Macedonian Literature in English Volume 99, St Clement of Ohrid National and University Library, Skopje, 2011
- "Hotel Europa" published in the anthology New Europe (Plays from the Continent) edited by Bonnie Marranca and Malgorzata Semil, PAJ Publications, New York, New York, 2009
- "Proud Flesh" in Ten Modern Macedonian Plays, edited and with a foreword by Jelena Lužina, Matica Makedonska, Skopje, 2000, ISBN 9989-48-310-8
- "Sarajevo" in Balkan Blues (Writing out of Yugoslavia), ed. Joanna Labon, pp. 211–268, Northwestern University Press, Evanston, Illinois, 1995, ISBN 0-8101-1325-2
- "Sarajevo" in Storm (Out of Yugoslavia), No. 6, pp. 210–268, edited by Joanna Labon, published in association with Carcanet Press, London, 1994, ISBN 1 85754 110 3
- "Sarajevo" in Performing Arts Journal, New York, Vol l. XVI, No.2, 1994
- Hi-Fi/The False Bottom (The Translation Series), translated by Patricia Marsh-Stefanovska, BkMk Press of the University of Missouri – Kansas, 1986 ISBN 978-0933532496
- "Flying on the Spot", translated by Patricia Marsh-Stefanovska, in theatre magazine Scena, English issue 8, pp. 170–188, Novi Sad, 1985
- "Proud Flesh", translated and with a foreword by Prof. Ralph Bogert, in Slavic and East European Arts, Vol.2, No.1, pp. 59–93, State University of New York at Stony Brook, 1983
- "Proud Flesh", translated by Alan McConnell Duff, in the theatre magazine Scena, (English Issue 4), pp. 170–186, Novi Sad, Serbia, 1981

=== In French ===
- Černodrinski revient à la maison, translated by Maria Béjanovska, L'Espace d'un Instant, Paris, 2013 ISBN 978-2-915037-79-1
- Le démon de Debarmaalo, translated by Maria Béjanovska, L'Espace d'un Instant, Paris, 2010 ISBN 978-2-915037-55-5
- Hôtel Europa : Scénario pour un événement théâtral, translated by Séverine Magois, L'Espace d'un Instant, Paris, 2005 ISBN 978-2915037166
- "Ex-Yougoslavie, le théâtre dans la guerre, textes réunis, traduits et présentés par Mireille Robin" (an excerpt from "Sarajevo" translated into French), Les Cahiers, Revue Trimestrielle de Théàtre, Comédie-Française, No.9, Paris

=== In Spanish ===
- Sarajevo y Figurae Veneris Historiae, translated by Marija Pendeva and Jose Gabriel Santander Serrano, Publicaciones de la Asociación de Directores de Escena de España, Madrid, 2016 ISBN 978-84-92639-87-8
- Carne orgullosa y Doble fondo (Spanish translations of "Wild Flesh" and "The False Bottom" by Marija Pendeva and Jose Gabriel Santander Serrano), Publicaciones de la Asociación de Directores de Escena de España, Serie: Literatura Dramatica, No. 92, Madrid, 2015 ISBN 978-84-92639-77-9
- Hotel Europa y Everyman (El Hombre), translated by Marija Pendeva and Jose Gabriel Santander Serrano, Publicaciones de la Asociación de Directores de Escena de España, Serie: Literatura Dramatica, No. 89, Madrid, 2015 ISBN 978-84-92639-69-4

=== In Italian ===
- Teatro (Italian translations of "Wild Flesh", "Tattooed Souls", "The Black Hole", "Euralien", "Hotel Europa", "The Demon of Debar Maalo" and "Odysseus" by Ana Stefanovska), preface by Paolo Magelli, CUEPRESS, Imalo, Italy, 2022
- "Anime Tatuate" ("Tattooed Souls"), translated by Nicoletta Gaida, in Il Gallo Silvestre, 9, pp. 61–100, Sestante, Mira (Ve), Venezia, 1997

=== In German ===
- "Hotel Europa" in Neue Stücke aus Europa, translated by Elena Krüskemper, Bonn, Germany, 2000
- "Sarajevo", translated by Sabine Zolchow, Theater der Zeit, No. 1, Essen, Mai/Juni 1993
- "Long Play", translated by Simona Erlitzer, in YU Fest 1988, National Theatre of Subotica, pp. 170–205, Subotica, 1988

=== In Russian ===
- "Чернодринский возвращается домой", in Современная македонская пьеса translated by Olga Pankina, ed. Olga Pankina, Okojom, Moscow, 2010 ISBN 978-5-904531-04-1
- Полет на месте и другие пьесы Горан Стефановский ("Yané Zadrogaz", "Wild Flesh", "Flying on the Spot") Радуга, 1987
- "Яне-баламут" ("Yané Zadrogaz") in Драматургия Югославии Серия: Библиотека югославской литературы, edited and translated by Natalija Vagapova, pp. 583–622, Iskustvo, Moscow, 1982

=== In Serbian ===
- "Чернодринсҡи се враҕa дoma" ("Chernodrinski comes back home"), translated by the author, Мостови, (Часопис за пҏеводну ҝњижевност), 111, Беогҏад, 1997
- "Bahanalije" ("Bacchanalia"), translated by Gojko Janušević, in Scena theatre magazine, 1–2, Novi Sad, 1997
- "Crna rupa" ("The Black Hole") translated by Gojko Janušević, in Scena theatre magazine, 1, no. XXIV, pp. 199–208, Novi Sad, 1988
- Teтoвиранe душе и друге драме ("Tattooed Souls", "Flying on the Spot", "Hi-Fi" and "Wild Flesh"), Narodna Knjiga, Beograd, 1987 ISBN 86-331-0204-8
- "Duplo dno" ("The False Bottom"), translated by Risto Vasilevski, Ka novoj drami, Vol. 3, pp. 5–36, edited by Dragana Bošković, Nova Knjiga, Beograd, 1987
- "Teтoвиранe душе" ("Tattooed Souls"), translated by the author, in Књижевне новине, 700–701, pp. 29–32, Београд, 1985
- "Divlje meso" ("Wild Flesh"), translated by Gojko Janušević, in Antologija savremene jugoslovenske drame, Vol.2, pp. 325–403, edited by Ognjen Lakićević, Svetozar Marković, Beograd, 1984
- "Hi-Fi", translated by Biljana Biljanovska, in Ka novoj drami, Vol. 3, pp. 1–63, (Afterword by Dževad Karahasan), Tribina, Beograd, 1983
- "Let u mestu" ("Flying on the Spot"), translated by Dušan Gorenčevski, in Scena theatre magazine, XVIII, 2, pp. 109–128, Novi Sad, 1982
- Divlje meso ("Wild Flesh"), translated by Gojko Janušević, Sterijino Pozorje, Novi Sad, Serbia, 1980

=== In Croatian ===
- Odisej i druge drame ("Wild Flesh", "The Black Hole", "The Demon of Debar Maalo", "Odysseus"), Hrvatska sveučilišna naklada, 2018 ISBN 9789531694124
- "Divlje meso" ("Wild Flesh"), translated by Borislav Pavlovski, in Suvremene makedonske drame, pp. 213–260, edited by Branko Hećimović and Borislav Pavlovski, Znanje, Zagreb, 1982

=== In Slovenian ===
- Odisej (Odysseus), translated by Branka Nikl Klampfer, Maribor, Hisa Knjig, Založba KMS, 2012 ISBN 978-961-6744-55-3
- Demon iz Debar Maala (a collection of four plays "Proud Flesh", "Tattooed Souls", "Hotel Europa" and "The Demon of Debarmaalo"), translated into Slovenian by Aleš Mustar. Afterword by Lidija Dimkovska), pp. 299–307, Cankarjeva Založba, Ljubljana, 2008 ISBN 978-961-231-677-8
- "Hi-Fi", in Makedonska dramska besedila, translated by Mateja Dermelj, edited and with a foreword by Vladimir Osolnik, Univerza v Ljubljani, Ljubljana, pp. 88–115, 2003 ISBN 961-237-023-0
- "Bakanalije" ("Bacchanalia"), translated by Zdravko Duša, in Dramatikon 2, Beletrina, Ljubljana, pp. 217–252, 2000 ISBN 961-6356-19-4

=== In Romanian ===
- Goran Stefanovski: 7 piese de teatru, translated by Mihaela Cernăuţi-Gorodeţchi with Nikola Vangeli, Editura Artes, 2018 ISBN 978-606-547-410-9
- Europeretta, Book of plays translated by Ioana Ieronim, Tracus Arte, București, 2016
- Viata lumii ("Everyman"), translated by Nikola Vangeli, Contact International, Vol.23, 109, 110, 111, pp. 555–567, București, 2013
- Poveşti din Estul Sălbatic, Book of selected plays translated into Romanian by Ioana Ieronim, foreword by Ioana Ieronim, Fundaţia Culturală "Camil Petrescu", Revista Teatrul azi (supplement), prin Editura Cheiron, București, pp. 209, 2010 ISBN 978-606-8220-02-4
- "Everyman", translated by Ioana Ireonimin, in Antologia, Festivalul International de Teatru de la Sibiu, pp. 237–259 (in the original English pp. 534–556), Sibiu, 2009 ISBN 978-606-8073-02-6
- "Hotel Europa", translated by Ioana Ieronim, pp. 145–182 in Dramaturgie contemporana din Balcani, ed. Andreea Dumitru, preface by Ioana Ieronim, Fundatia Culturala Camil Petrescu, București, 2008

=== In Czech ===
- "Kdokoli" ("Everyman"), translated by Ivana Dorovská, in Ctyri Jihoslovanska Dramata (a selection of four Yugoslav plays), pp. 109–139, including a critical essay by Ivana Dorovská "Letmy pohled na soucasnou jihoslovansku dramatickou tvorbu" pp. 5–16, Boskovice, Brno, 2008 ISBN 80-7326-122-7

=== In Slovak ===
- Vybrane dramatické práce (collection of plays translated into Slovak by Jan Janković: "Flying on the Spot", "Tattooed Souls", "Wild Flesh", "Everyman", "The Black Hole" and "Hi-Fi"), Juga, Bratislava, 2009 ISBN 978-80-89030-42-2
- "Tetovane Duše" ("Tattooed Souls"), translated by Jan Janković, Javisko theatre magazine, no.6, Bratislava, 1994
- "Žive maso" ("Wild Flesh"), translated by Jan Janković in Javisko theatre magazine, no.1, pp. 17–33, Bratislava, 1989

=== In Polish ===
- "Demon z przdemieścia" ("The Demon of Debarmaalo"), translated by Danuta Ćirlić-Straczyńska, in Dialog, pp. 104–130, Warsawa, May 2007
- "Sarajewo", translated by Danuta Ćirlić-Straczyńska, in Dialog 4, Kwiecen 1994, Warsawa, 1994
- "Dzikie mięso" ("Wild Flesh"), translated by Jolanta Klaszninowska, in Antologia wspöłczesnego dramatu jugosłowiańskiego, edited by Ognjen Lakićević, pp. 321–378, Wydawnictwo Łódzkie, Łódź, 1988

=== In Turkish ===
- Dövmelí Canlar ("Tattooed Souls"), translated by Zekir Sipahi, Seyirlik Yayınları, Istanbul, 1994 ISBN 975-7296-00-7

=== In Hungarian ===
- "Vadhus" ("Wild Flesh") translated by Marietta Vujicsics, in HID magazine no. XLIX, 7–8, pp. 950–971 & in 9, pp. 1128–1156, Novi Sad, 1985

== Scripts/adaptations ==
- Traviata - 1989. Libretto for a rock opera produced by Omladinski Kulturni Centar, Zagreb, Croatia, ex-Yugoslavia
- Зодијак - 1990 (Zodiac) Libretto for a rock ballet produced by the Macedonian National Theatre Ballet with music by V. Stefanovski and B.Arsovski
- Го сакам Чернодрински – 1991 (I love Chernodrinski). A multi-media performance produced by the Bitola National Theatre, Republic of Macedonia
- Brecht in Hollywood – 1995. Part-time collaborator on this devised piece for the theatre, produced and performed by the Moving Theatre at Bridge Lane, London
- On the Road to Baghdad – 1999. Adaptation of the novel of the same name by Güneli Gün, commissioned and produced by the Green Candle Dance Company, London. Performed at Sadler's Wells, London
- Духот на слободата – 2003 (The Spirit of Freedom). Variations on a play by Chernodrinski produced by the National Theatre Bitola, Republic of Macedonia, in 2005

== Radio plays ==
- Shakespeare the Apprentice – 1975 Produced for Macedonian Radio in 1975

== One-act plays ==
- Гоце – 1991 (Gotsé). Produced for Makedonsko Oro by the Canadian-Macedonian Federation, Toronto, Canada, 1991
- Old Man Carrying Stones – 1994. Commissioned and produced by the Green Candle Company, London, premiered at the Lilian Baylis Theatre at Sadler's Wells, London
- Сега му е мајката – 1995 (It's Now or Never). Produced by an informal group and presented at the Dramski Teatar, Skopje
- Ex-Yu – 1996. Commissioned by The Tricycle Theatre, London, produced in May 1996, directed by Nicolas Kent
- Only Human – 1998. Commissioned by HMR, Sweden for the 50th anniversary of The Declaration of Human Rights, performed in 1998, directed by Suzanne Osten

== TV plays ==
- Клинч – 1974 (The Clinch). Produced and broadcast by The Macedonian National Television in 1975. Also produced two more times as a stage play.
- Сослушувањето на железничарот – 1977 (The Interrogation of the Railwayman). TV film, produced by TV Skopje
- Томе од бензинската пумпа – 1978 (Tom from the Petrol Station). TV film, produced by TV Skopje
- Тумба, тумба дивина – 1980 (Tumba, tumba, divina). Produced by TV Skopje
- Дивље месо – 1981 (Wild Flesh). Produced by TV Belgrade
- Оазата на Мира – 1994 (Mira's Oasis). New Year's Eve TV show produced by TV Skopje, Macedonia

== TV serials ==
- Наши години – 1979 (The Years of Our Lives). TV drama serial in 6 instalments, produced by Macedonian National Broadcasting Service
- Бушава азбука – 1985 (The Crazy Alphabet). TV series for children in 31 instalments, produced by Macedonian National Broadcasting Service - now available as a large hardback and paperback in an edition by Чудна шума, 2023 hardback: ISBN 978-608-4938-47-7 paperback: ISBN 978-608-4938-48-4
- Аирлија транзиција – 1996 (Long Live Transition) in six instalments.Commissioned by USAID and produced by Mala Stanica, Skopje
- Наше маало – 1998 (Our Neighbourhood). Story bible for children's TV series commissioned by CTW, Children's Television Network, New York, the makers of Sesame Street. Produced by Search For Common Ground. First series broadcast 2001.

== Screenplays ==
- Хај-фај – 1988 (Hi-Fi). Feature film script produced by The Vardar Film Company, Skopje, Macedonia, directed by Vladimir Blaževski (Владимир Блажевски)
- Parigi-Istra – 1991 PARIGI-ISTRA Script for part of an omnibus feature film, produced in Croatia, directed by Rajko Grlić
- До балчак 1987, 2001 and 2011 (To the Hilt/Wild Wild East). Feature film script, optioned by Watershed Productions, London. Finally produced by Jordančo Čevrevski (Јорданчо Чевревски) and Vladimir Anastasov (Владимир Анастасов) and directed by Stolé Popov (Столе Попов)
- Walter and Virginia – 2005. First draft of a feature film script commissioned by Get Film, Stockholm, directed by Suzanne Osten
- Frau Einstein – 2007. Doctoring of feature film script for Hammer Productions, Novi Sad, Serbia
- What do you want?- 2007. Script for short film based on etching by and interview with Nick Burton, edited by Andy Birtwistle

== Screenwriting manual ==
- A Little Book of Traps, a scriptwriting tool – 2002. Dramatiska Institutet, Stockholm, Sweden

Available in translation:

Into Macedonian:

- Мала книга на стапици (помагало за пишување драми), Табернакул, Скопје, 2003 ISBN 9989-937-48-6 out of print; republished by Издавачки центар Три, 2003 ISBN 978-608-2308-93-7

Into Chinese (Standard Mandarin):

- "A Little Book of Traps, a scriptwriting tool", translated by Li Lina, Journal of Beijing Film Academy, No.78, Issue 5 2007/2010

Into Serbian:

- Mala knjiga zamki (kako napisati dramu), Sterijino pozorje, Novi Sad, 2009

Into Slovak:

- Malá kniha nástrah (príručka na písanie hier), Divadelný ústav v Bratislave, Bratislava, 2010

== Prose poems ==
- Конзервирани импресии ("Canned Impressions"), Темплум, Скопје, 2020 ISBN 978-608-4871-29-3
- Конзервирани импресии ("Canned Impressions"), Табернакул, Скопје, 2014 (Второ издание) ISBN 978-608-210-391-4
- Конзервирани импресии ("Canned Impressions"), Магма книга 13, Темплум, Скопје, 2004 ISBN 9989-902-38-0

== Published articles and essays ==
- 2022 "Eloge du Contraire" ("In Praise of Opposites"), 11 essays selected and with a preface by Ivan Dodovski, translated from Macedonian into French by Maria Béjanovska, éditions L'Espace d'un Instant, Maison d'Europe et d'Orient, ISBN 978-2-37572-041-7
- 2012 "Cearta dintre mine si Kafka" ("A Quarrel with Kafka"), translated into Romanian by Ioana Ieronim, Romania Literara, 9, annul XLIV, 2.3.2012
- 2010 Кавга со Кафка и други есеи, (Quarrel with Kafka and Other Essays), Табернакул, Скопје, 2010 ISBN 978-608-210-148-4
- 2010 "Chinese Whispers", in Shoreless Bridges (South East European Writing in Diaspora), edited by Elka Agoston-Nikolova, Rodopi, Amsterdam/New York, NY 2010, (Studies in Slavic Literature and Poetics 55), pp. 21–26, ISBN 978-90-420-3020-6, ISBN 978-90-420-3021-3 E-Book
- 2010 "Trans Artists and Cis Artists" published in TEAM Network Year Book (Transdisciplinary European Arts Magazine), pp. 44–492009
- 2009 "Tales from the Wild East", translated into Romanian by Ioana Ieronimin, in the weekly Luceafarul, 45–46, 30.12.2009, Bucuresti. Online version: http://www.revistaluceafarul.ro/index.html?id=1792&editie=812009,
- 2009 Monologue from the essay "Heart of the Matter" translated into Romanian by Ioana Ieronim, published in the weekly Romania literara, Number 51–52, 2009. Online version: http://www.romlit.ro/goran_stefanovski-fondul_problemei
- 2009 "Geschichten aus dem Wilden Osten", (German translation of "Tales from the Wild East" by Eva Bonne) in Wespennest – Zeitschrift für brauchbare Texte und Bilder, Nummer 154, Marz; Wien, ISBN 978-3-85458-154-3
- 2008 "Playwright as a maker of Plays" in Literary Landscapes, Central European Initiative, Round Table at Vilenica, The Author between Text and Context, Essays, pp. 41–52, Drustvo slovenskih pisateljev, Ljubljana. ISBN 978-961-6547-30-7 2008
- 2008 "After Dinner Speech" in Best of Sarajevo Notebooks, No 18, 2008, Sarajevo, Bosnia and Herzegovina
- 2008 "Tales from the Wild East" in Theatre and Performance in Eastern Europe, edited by Dennis Barnett and Arthur Skelton, The Scarecrow Press, Lanham, Maryland, U.S.A, pp. 147–155
- 2007 "Dlaczego Balkany nie sa sexy" (Polish translation of "Tales from the Wild East" by Dorota Jovanka Ćirlić) in Dialog, pp. 94–103, Warsawa, May 2007
- 2006 "The Heart of the Matter" in The Heart of the Matter (The Role of the Arts and Culture in Balkan European Integration), ed. Chris Keulemans, pp. 68–73, European Cultural Foundation, Amsterdam, 2006
- 2006 "Stammi a sentire, Gran Bretagna" in Quando la Cultura fa la differenza (Patrimonio, arti e media nella societa multiculturale), ed. Simona Bodo and Maria Rita Cifarelli, pp 149–155, Meltemi Editore, Roma
- 2005 "O našoj priči" ("On Our Story"), an essay, translated by Nenad Vujadinović, Mostovi, pp. 129–130, Beograd
- 2005 "Tales from the Wild East" essay in Hotel Europa, translated into French by Séverine Magois, éditions L'Espace d'un Instant, Paris
- 2005 Приказни од дивиот исток ("Tales from the Wild East"), essays and interviews, Табернакул, Скопје
- 2004 "A Tale from the Wild East" in Alter Ego – Twenty Confronting Views on the European Experience, edited by Guido Snel, Amsterdam University Press, Salome
- 2001 "Za kaj Balkan ni seksi", ("Tales from the Wild East", Slovenian translation of essay), Air Beletrina 12–13, Ljubljana
- 2001 "Bakanalije" in Dramatikon 2, Beletrina, Ljubljana
- 2000 "Fables du monde sauvage de l'Est" ("Tales from the Wild East"), French translation of essay, Alternatives théâtrales, 64, Bruxelles
- 2000 "Priče s divljeg istoka" ("Tales from the Wild East"), Croatian translation of essay, 15 Dana, 6/2000
- 2000 "Geschichten aus dem Wilden Osten" ("Tales from the Wild East"), German translation of essay, Theater Heute, No. 6, June 2000
- 1999 "Priče s divljeg istoka" ("Tales from the Wild East"), Croatian translation of essay, Radio Zagreb III, Zagreb
- 1999 "Zasto Balkan nije seksi" ("Tales from the Wild East"), Serbian translation of essay, NIN, Beograd
- 1999 "Приказни од дивиот исток" ("Tales from the Wild East"), an essay, Forum, Skopje
- 1996 "Англиската драма без Шекспир во Македонија од 1915 до 1985" ("English drama in Macedonia between 1915 and 1985 (without Shakespeare)"), Книжевен контекст, Faculty of Philology, Skopje, pp. 222–233, ISBN 9989-724-00-8
- 1991 "Pearls of Wisdom", EuroMaske (European Theatre Quarterly), No. 3, Ljubljana
- 1986 "Англиската драма без Шекспир во Македонија од 1915 до 1985" ("English drama (excluding Shakespeare) in Macedonia 1915-1985"), Театарски гласник, 28, pp. 23–28, Skopje, 1986
- 1980 "Разумен театар - Едвард Бонд" ("The Rational Тheatre of Edward Bond"), Театарски гласник, 13–14, pp. 10–14, Skopje
- 1978 "Сценските ремарки како основа на театарот на Самјуел Бекет", ("The stage directions as the foundation of Samuel Beckett's theatre"), Театарски гласник, III, 5–6, pp. 12–13, Skopje, 1978

== Practice-based research ==
- Hamlet: Live, Die, Repeat, 20 October 2017
- Tintin in the Balkans, 22 October 2015
- Teaching the Unteachable, 15 September 2015
- From First Idea to First Night, 24 March 2015
