= Gordana Ćulibrk =

Serbian writer

Gordana Ćulibrk (1952) is a Serbian writer. She lives and works in Belgrade.

She publishes prose and poetry. She received the Crnjanski Stage Award in 1999 for the short story "The Wolf". Ćulibrk is the founder and member of the editorial board of the literary magazine Pokus, as well as the editor of the ID "Književna akademija". She is a member of the Belgrade Writers' Association.

== Works ==
- The Power of the Imprint (2004), a book of poetry
- A desolate island in the heart of civilization (2007), a novel
- Vrnite mi Metohiju (2007)

Her books were translated into French, English and Russian. She is represented in several anthologies.
