= Gordana Garašić =

Croatian army officer

- Military career
- Service years: 1995–present
- Rank: Brigadier general

Major General Gordana Garašić is a Croatian army officer and that country's first female general officer. A human resources expert, she has been posted to the International Security Assistance Force in Afghanistan. Garašić has also served as an adviser to the Croatian delegations to NATO and the European Union and as an adviser to the Croatian president.

== Career ==
Garašić joined the Croatian Ministry of Defence in 1995 after graduating from law school. She had intended to join the Ministry of the Interior but reported to the defence ministry by mistake and was appointed as a senior counsellor in the Human Resources department. The country was at that time fighting the Croatian War of Independence. Garašić has served as an adviser to the Croatian delegations to NATO and the European Union and as a defence adviser to the president of Croatia. Garašić was posted to the NATO-led International Security Assistance Force (ISAF) in Afghanistan for six months in 2010 as head of personal affairs in Regional Command North. She also studied at the Dwight D. Eisenhower School for National Security and Resource Strategy in the United States. Garašić was promoted to the rank of colonel in 2011.

On 1 April 2014 Garašić was promoted to the temporary rank of major general prior to her posting as adviser for gender issues to ISAF. She became the first Croatian woman to hold general rank. In Afghanistan Garašić oversaw the introduction of an all-female facility for the Afghan National Police's elite Crisis Response Units. Her contribution to the integration of women into the police force was recognised in December 2014 when the Afghan government awarded her a medal for achievement. Garašić was appointed to the permanent rank of brigadier general in 2015 and is currently Deputy Director of RACVIAC, an international security co-operation mission based in Croatia.
