= Goca (nickname) =

Goca (pronounced [ɡotsa]; Serbian Cyrillic: Гоца) is a nickname, often a diminutive form (hypocorism) of Gorana or Gordana. The nickname may refer to:

- Goca Božinovska, a Serbian pop-folk singer
- Goca Tržan, a Serbian pop singer
