= Goran Obradović =

Goran Obradović may refer to:

- Goran Obradović (footballer, born 1976), Serbian footballer
- Goran Obradović (footballer, born 1986), (1986-2021) Serbian footballer.
- Goran Obradović (coach) (born 1971), Serbian track and field coach
