= Gordana Turuk =

German artist

Personal details
- Born: March 5, 1974 (age 51) Mannheim, Germany

Gordana Turuk (5 March 1974, Mannheim, Germany) is an artist whose works include glass images, works of art, furniture and accessories made from glass. Gordana Turuk has Croatian heritage. Her works are created under the Gordana Glass brand.

== Education ==
Her education was responsible for leading her in an artistic direction. She first studied textile arts in Zagreb (1992-1994), which she followed up with fashion design at the private Callegari school (Pescara, 1994 - 1998), where she studied under academic painter Josip Marinkovic.

== Works ==
Her works of art are created using an annealed glass technique where coloured pigments are added into the molten glass in combination with pure gold and platinum. Annealed glass is a glass-making technique where the glass is heated to a high temperature to its stress-relief point after which it is poured into prepared moulds that are placed below it. This allows the glass to be used to create various ornaments and to create an aged glass patina.

Gordana Glass pieces have been used as gifts for foreign dignitaries during visits to Slovakia. Examples include Britain's Queen Elizabeth II (who was presented with a glass jewellery box inlaid with gold and platinum by the former president during her official visit to Slovakia), Pope Benedict XVI (who received a golden gross during his visit to Slovakia), the King of Denmark and presidents Miloš Zeman, Václav Klaus, Andrej Kiska and Ivo Josipovič.

The Gordana Glass Gallery is located in the centre of Prague on Dušní ulice.

Gordana Turuk's studio is located close to Bratislava in the villa section of Bratislava's Lamač borough.

She is actively engaged in charitable activities and the Arte Bene civic association in addition to her artistic endeavours.
