= Gordana Kozlovački =

Serbian politician (born 1958)

Gordana Kozlovački (Serbian Cyrillic: Гордана Козловачки; born 21 March 1958) is a politician, medical doctor, and administrator in Serbia. She served in the Assembly of Vojvodina from 2016 to 2020 as a member of the Democratic Party (Demokratska stranka, DS).

== Early life and private career ==
Kozlovački was born in Zrenjanin, in what was then the People's Republic of Serbia in the Federal People's Republic of Yugoslavia. She studied medicine at the University of Belgrade and the University of Novi Sad, becoming a medical doctor in 1984, a specialist in internal medicine in 1996, a specialist in nephrology in 2000, and a master manager in the health care system in 2013. She served as director of Zrenjanin's General Hospital "Dr Đordje Joanović" from 2009 to 2016.

== Politician ==
=== Municipal politics ===
Kozlovački received the forty-seventh position on the DS's For a European Serbia electoral list in Zrenjanin for the 2008 Serbian local elections. The list won twenty-six seats, and she did not take a mandate. She was later given the thirty-sixth position on the DS list in the 2012 local elections and was not elected when the list won fifteen seats.

She led the DS's list for Zrenjanin in the 2016 local elections and was elected when the list won four mandates. Her term in the local assembly was brief; she resigned on 12 July 2016.

=== Provincial politics ===
Kozlovački appeared in the sixth position on the DS's electoral list in the 2016 Vojvodina provincial election and was elected when the list won ten mandates. The Serbian Progressive Party (Srpska napredna stranka, SNS) and its allies won an outright majority, and the DS served in opposition. Kozlovački was appointed to the assembly committees on health and local self-government.

The Democratic Party began boycotting Serbia's legislative bodies in 2019, charging that the SNS was undermining democracy in the country. The DS ultimately boycotted the 2020 Vojvodina provincial election, bringing Kozlovački's term in the assembly to an end.
