= Gordana Komadina =

Croatian basketball player

Personal information
- Born: 20 April 1976 (age 50) Šibenik, SFR Yugoslavia

Career history
- Elemes Šibenik
- Gospić

Gordana Komadina (born 20 April 1976 Šibenik, SFR Yugoslavia) is a former Croatian female basketball player.
