= Kosta Trifković =

Serbian writer

Kosta Trifković Коста Трифковић
- Born: 20 October 1843; Novi Sad, Kingdom of Hungary, Austrian Empire (modern-day Serbia)
- Died: 19 February 1875 (aged 31); Novi Sad, Kingdom of Hungary, Austrian Empire (modern-day Serbia)
- Resting place: Novi Sad, Serbia
- Writing career
- Language: Serbian

Kosta Trifković (Serbian Cyrillic: Коста Трифковић; 20 October 1843 – 19 February 1875) was a Serbian writer and one of the best comediographers of the time. Trifković wrote lighthearted comedies about city life in Vojvodina which were popular with the public, especially his best play, The Choosy Bride-to-Be (Izbiračica).

== Biography ==
Kosta Trifković was born in Danube Street (Dunavska ulica) in the city of Novi Sad on October 20, 1843, at the time in the Kingdom of Hungary, Austrian Empire (modern-day Serbia). He was the only child of Atanasije and Ane Trifković. He studied in Novi Sad, Vinkovci, Pest, and in Rijeka took courses in seafaring. He went to sea just before finishing high school, but his delicate health proved unequal to the task, and after two years sailing the seven seas he went to Bratislava (Pozun) to study law. Upon graduation, he moved back to Novi Sad where he established his law practice with a colleague, Djordje Vukičević, in 1867. In 1870 he became a senator and president of the borough court in Novi Sad. There he wrote plays in his spare time. Soon his passion for the stage completely engrossed him, he tried his hand both at dramatic criticism and at dramatic authorship.

The father of Serbian comedy, Jovan Sterija Popović, who dramatized universal problems and stated didactic imperatives, became outmoded and soon was overshadowed by a score of young writers. Kosta Trifković filled the gap between Sterija-Popović and the new school. Trifković's first piece, Mladost Dositeja Obradovića (lit. 'The Youth of Dositej Obradović'), was produced in 1871, and proved the writer to be the legitimate successor of Jovan Sterija Popović. His industry was prodigious: between 1871 and 1874, he composed fifteen plays, all of them original, and not counting numerous translations or recasts of classical masterpieces.

He died of consumption in Novi Sad on February 19, 1875. He was 32.

Serbian national history furnished an abundant source of subjects and inspiration. Among the masters of the nineteenth century theater, we may mention Jovan Sterija Popović, Jovan Subotić, Branislav Nušić, Ivo Vojnović and Kosta Trifković, who followed Jovan Sterija Popović in this field, though his comedies of intrigue have no didactic purpose. Trifković depicts his limited environment with kind humour, particularly with My Congratulations, The Overseer and Fastidious Girl.

== Works ==
His most popular dramatic pieces were Čestitam, Školski nadzornik, Francuski-pruski rat, Izbiračica, Ljubavno pismo, Na Badnji dan, Pola vina, pola vode), Mila, and Mladost Dositeja Obradovića. He wrote 15 original comedies, and translated many foreign comedies for the Serbian theatre. Kosta Trifković's dramatic works have been translated into German, French, Italian, Hungarian, Slovenian, Bulgarian, and other languages.

== Bibliography ==
Plays:

- Milo za drago (Tit for Tat, 1870)
- Mladost Dositeja Obradovića (The Youth of Dositej Obradović, 1871)
- Na badnji dan (On Christmas Eve, 1871)
- Čestita (My Congratulations, 1871)
- Školski nadzornik (The School Inspector or The Overseer, 1871)
- Francusko-pruski rat (The Franco-Prussian War, 1872)
- Izbiračica (The Choosy Bride-to-Be or Fastidious Girl, 1872)
- Ljubavno pismo (The Love Letter, 1873)
- Mila (1872)
- Ni brigeša (1872)
- Tera opozicija (Pressure from the Opposition)
- Pola vina, pola vode (Half Wine, Half Water)
- Mrnarska vera

Short stories:

- Ivančin grob (Ivan's Tomb, 1872)
- Mletačke tamnice (Venetian Prison, 1872)

== External sources ==
- Jovan Skerlić, Istorija Nove Srpske Književnosti/ History of Modern Serbian Literature (Belgrade, 1914, 1921), pages 344-346.
