= Miladin Ševarlić (dramatist) =

Serbian writer, director and dramatist

- Born: 1943; Belgrade, Serbia
- Occupation: playwright, theater and TV director
- Period: 1968-2014

Miladin Ševarlić (Serbian: Миладин Шеварлић, born in 1943), Serbian writer, director and dramatist.

== Biography ==
Miladin Ševarlić was born in Belgrade in 1943. Graduated in world literature (1967) and dramaturgy (1968). He spent his working life, mainly in theaters, as a dramatist, artistic director and manager. He was also the editor-in-chief of the Art program of TV Belgrade and the editor-in-chief of the publishing company "Prosveta". He is the editor-in-chief of the magazine Drama, the Association of Dramatists of Serbia, whose president he served for two terms (the first time in 1984). He was elected president for the third time in 2010. He is a member of the Association of Writers of Serbia, by invitation.

== Literary work ==
He is the author of more than 30 dramatic works, which, starting in 1968, were performed in theaters in the country and abroad, broadcast on radio and television, and printed in periodicals, collections, anthologies and special editions. He also published five books of Selected Dramas. (See the website of the Association of Playwrights of Serbia - Special Editions.) Directed two of his plays, Mr. Minister and Seducer. Wrote television and film scripts.

He also published poems in literary magazines in the 1960s and 1970s (Savremenik, Književnost, Delo...), theater reviews in Politica Express in the 1970s, and essays on social and cultural issues in the newspaper Borba in the 1990s, later in the magazine Drama and other publications. Stage adaptation of Gorski vijenac of Petar Petrović Njegoš, was performed for him in 1973 at the Montenegrin National Theater. His novel The Death of Colonel Kuzmanović was published by the Serbian Literature Society, 1986, and the Encyclopaedia of Customs and Beliefs (with Miodrag Zupanac), Sfairos, 1989. Plato, 2001. Plato also published a book of essays, Serbian Atlantida, in 2002, and in 2014, the Cultural and educational community of Serbia published a book of excerpts from Ševarlić's diary, entitled Whiskey and Trumpeters. A collection of collected essays, speeches, articles and interviews was published by Čigoja and the Association of Playwrights of Serbia under the title Motherland is in Danger, and a collection of poems Oklopnici (patriotic poems) was published by the Cultural and Educational Association of Serbia in 2019.

== Awards ==
He has been awarded several times for his works: the award at the first (anonymous) competition of the Association of Dramatists of Serbia (1980), for the play The Decline of the Serbian Empire; three "Branislav Nušić" awards, for the plays Heavenly Army (1986), Dragon of Serbia (1990) and The Seducer (2000); "Sterija Award" at the 29th Sterija Theater (1994) for the drama Dragon of Serbia; prize for the text at the Festival of First Performances in Paraćin (1994), for the drama Dragon of Serbia; the "Joakim Vujić" award (1995) for the drama Karađorđe; the "Golden Link" award for a permanent contribution to the culture of Belgrade (1999). Recognition of the Government of the Republic of Serbia for outstanding contribution to national culture (2011), high international recognition for life's work of the academy "Ivo Andrić" in 2014 and Vuk's award for outstanding contribution to the development of culture in the Republic of Serbia and the all-Serbian cultural space (2017).
