= Branko Baletić =

Serbian-Montenegrin film director

Branko Baletić (pronounced [brǎːŋkɔ bâlɛtit͡ɕ]; born 5 June 1946 in Belgrade, Serbia) is a Montenegrin film director and producer.

== Career ==
His films include Granica (1990) (producer), Stela (1990) (executive producer), and his most celebrated, Balkan Express (1983), a comic tale of Serbian bootleggers and thieves during the German occupation in WW2, which remains a milestone of Serbian cinema.

== Filmography ==
- 2007: Balkan ekspres 3 (director)
- 2005: Imam nesto vazno da vam kazem (producer)
- 1997: Tri letnja dana Vozac autobusa aka Three Summer Days (actor)
- 1995: "Otvorena vrata" Cekajuci Batu, one episode (director)
- 1990: Granica (producer)
- 1990: Stela (executive producer)
- 1989: Najbolji (executive producer)
- 1989: Hamburg Altona (executive producer)
- 1988: Klopka (executive producer)
- 1988: Zivot sa stricem aka My Uncle's Legacy (executive producer)
- 1987: Dogodilo se na danasnji dan aka It Happened on This Very Day, English title (producer)
- 1987: Uvek spremne zene (director)
- 1987: Uvek spremne zene (writer)
- 1986: Nanule aka Zivjeti se mora, a Croatian title for television (supervising producer)
- 1983: Balkan ekspres aka Balkan Express (director)
- 1983: Kamiondzije 2 television series (second unit director)
- 1981: Sok od sljiva (director)
- 1981: Sok od sljiva (writer)
- 1977: Specijalno vaspitanje aka Special Education, English title
- 1969: Drzi bure vodu dok majstori odu Television Series (director)
- 1969: Laka lova Television Series (director)
