= Slobodan Unkovski =

Macedonian director and academic

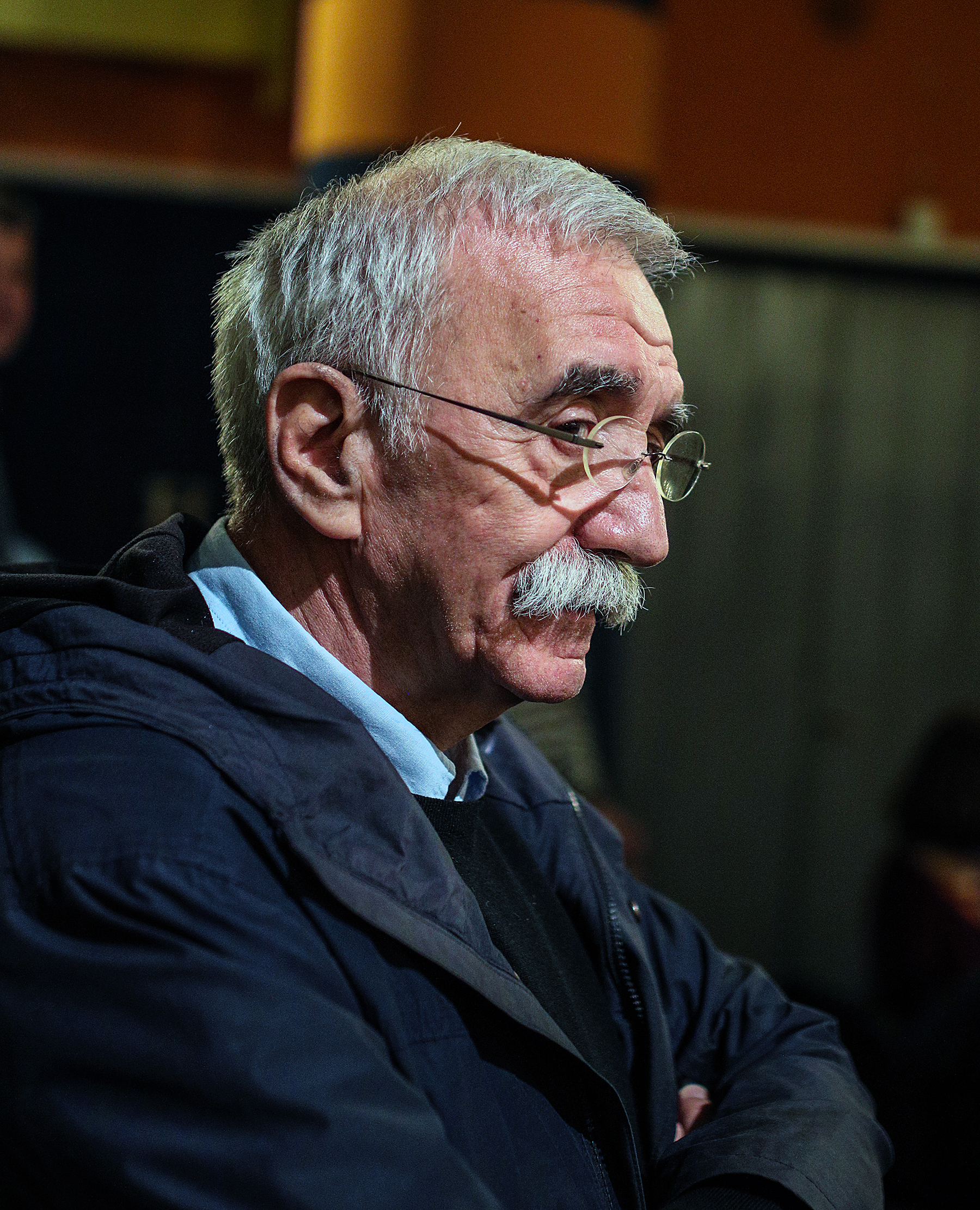
- Born: 1948 (age 77–78); Skopje, SFR Yugoslavia (present-day North Macedonia)
- Education: Faculty of Dramatic Arts, University of Arts in Belgrade
- Years active: 1974-present

Slobodan Unkovski (Macedonian: Слободан Унковски; born 1948) is a Macedonian director and university professor. He is known for TV Skopje show Bušava azbuka.

== Early life ==
Slobodan Unkovski was born in Skopje in 1948. He graduated in directing at the Academy of Theatre, Film, Radio and Television in Belgrade in 1971 in the class of Vjekoslav Afrić. He was also the Minister of Culture in the Macedonian government.

== Career ==
Unkovski directed numerous plays for the Yugoslav Drama Theater; such as Croatian Faust by Slobodan Šnajder in 1982, Cabaret Balkan by Dejan Dukovski in 1995, Milena Marković's Ship for the Dolls in 2006, William Shakespeare's As You Like It in 2009.

Unkovski is also known for directing TV movies based on dramas by Goran Stefanovski.

== Selected works ==
- An ordinary story, March 8, 1969, Belgrade, Yugoslav Drama Theatre
- Croatian Faust, December 7, 1982, Belgrade, Yugoslav Drama Theatre
- Tattooed souls, February 10, 1986, Belgrade, Zvezdara theatre
- Theater illusions, March 4, 1991, Belgrade, Yugoslav Drama Theatre
- Cabaret Balkan, March 18, 1995, Belgrade, Yugoslav Drama Theatre
- Ship for Dolls, June 5, 2006, Belgrade, Yugoslav Drama Theatre
- Figaro's Marriage and Divorce, November 16, 2006, Belgrade, National Theatre
- As you like it, November 20, 2009, Belgrade, Yugoslav Drama Theatre
- Mandragola, December 16, 2009, Belgrade, Madlenijanum
- It's not death, a bicycle (to have it stolen from you), June 17, 2011, Belgrade, Yugoslav Drama Theatre
- Life is a dream, January 23, 2012, Belgrade, National Theatre
- Einstein's dreams, October 15, 2017, Belgrade, Yugoslav Drama Theatre

== Awards ==
- The best performance of the Sterijino pozorje (1975, 1980, 1983, 1985, 1990)
- Best MESS Performance (1973, 1979, 1983)
- Award for the best director at Gavela evenings
- Bojan Stupica Award
