= Vida Ognjenović =

Serbian theater director and diplomat

Vida Ognjenović Вида Огњеновић
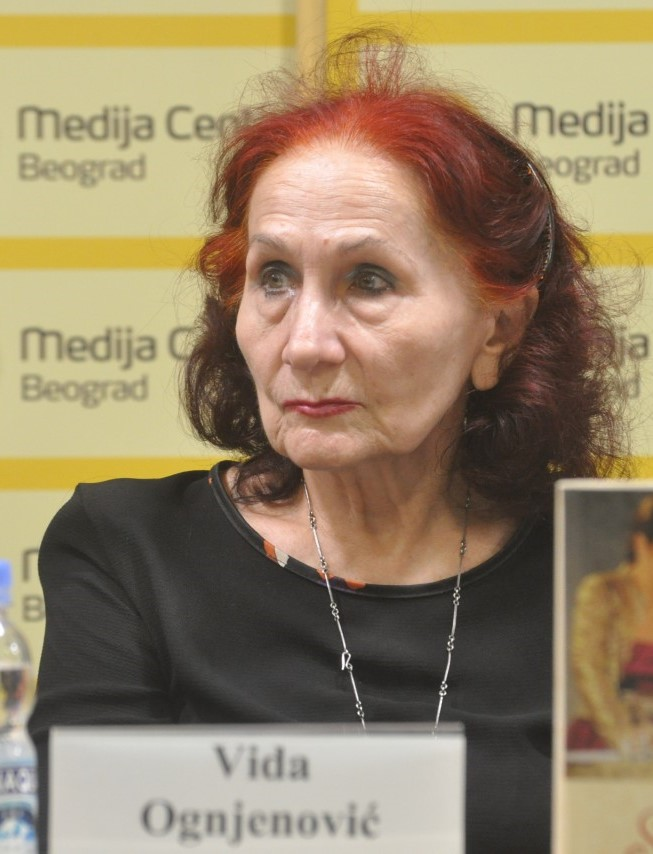

Serbian Ambassador to Denmark
- In office 13 June 2011 – 22 February 2013

Personal details
- Born: 14 August 1941 (age 85) Duboćke, Nikšić, Italian-occupied Montenegro
- Party: Social Democratic Party (2021–present); Democrats of Serbia (2021); Democratic Party (1990–1996; 2004–2020); Democratic Center (1996–2004)
- Education: University of Belgrade Faculty of Philology

Vida Ognjenović (Serbian Cyrillic: Вида Огњеновић, pronounced [ʋǐːda oɡɲěːnoʋitɕ]; born 14 August 1941) is a Serbian theater director, playwright, writer, drama professor and diplomat.

== Biography ==
Ognjenović completed primary education in the town of Vrbas, before going to Sremski Karlovci for gymnasium studies and later got degrees in world literature at University of Belgrade Faculty of Philology and directing at The Faculty of Dramatic Arts. She began her graduate studies in Paris at Sorbonne University and defended her master's thesis in 1972 at the University of Minnesota, after receiving a Fulbright scholarship.

She worked as an assistant at the Faculty of Dramatic Arts in Belgrade from 1975 to 1979, and in the 1990s became a professor at the Academy of Arts, University of Novi Sad. She was the first woman director of the National Theatre in Belgrade, between 1991 and 1993.

In 1989, she was one of the founders of the Democratic Party, the first opposition party in Serbia. She was appointed Ambassador to Norway representing Serbia and Montenegro from 2001 until 2006. She served as the ambassador of Serbia to Denmark from 2007 until 2013.

Her drama "Jegor's road" was inspired by the story about Russian monk from Praskvica Monastery.

She was one of the leading Parliamentary candidates of the Democratic Party in the January 2007 elections in Serbia. She was a vice-president of the Democratic Party.

She became a member of the Serbian Academy of Sciences and Arts in 2024.

== Awards ==
In 2012, she was given the World Award of Humanism by the Ohrid Academy of Humanism.

== Works ==
- Šekspiromanija (1980)
- Strah od scenske rasprave (1980)
- Melanholične drame (1991)
- Kanjoš Macedonović (1993)
- Devojka modre kose (1993)
- Setne komedije (1994)
- Otrovno mleko maslačka (1994)
- Kuća mrtvih mirisa (1995)
- Stari sat (1996)
- Mileva Ajnštajn (1999)
- Jegorov put (2000)
- Najlepše pripovetke (2001)
- Drame I-III (2001–2002)
- Putovanje u putopis (2006)
- Preljubnici (2006)
- Don Krsto (2007)
- Nasuprot proročanstvu (2007)
- Prava adresa (2007)
- Nema više naivnih pitanja (2008)
- Posmatrač ptica (2010)
- Živi primeri (2012)
