= Gordana Vlajić =

Serbian author and activist

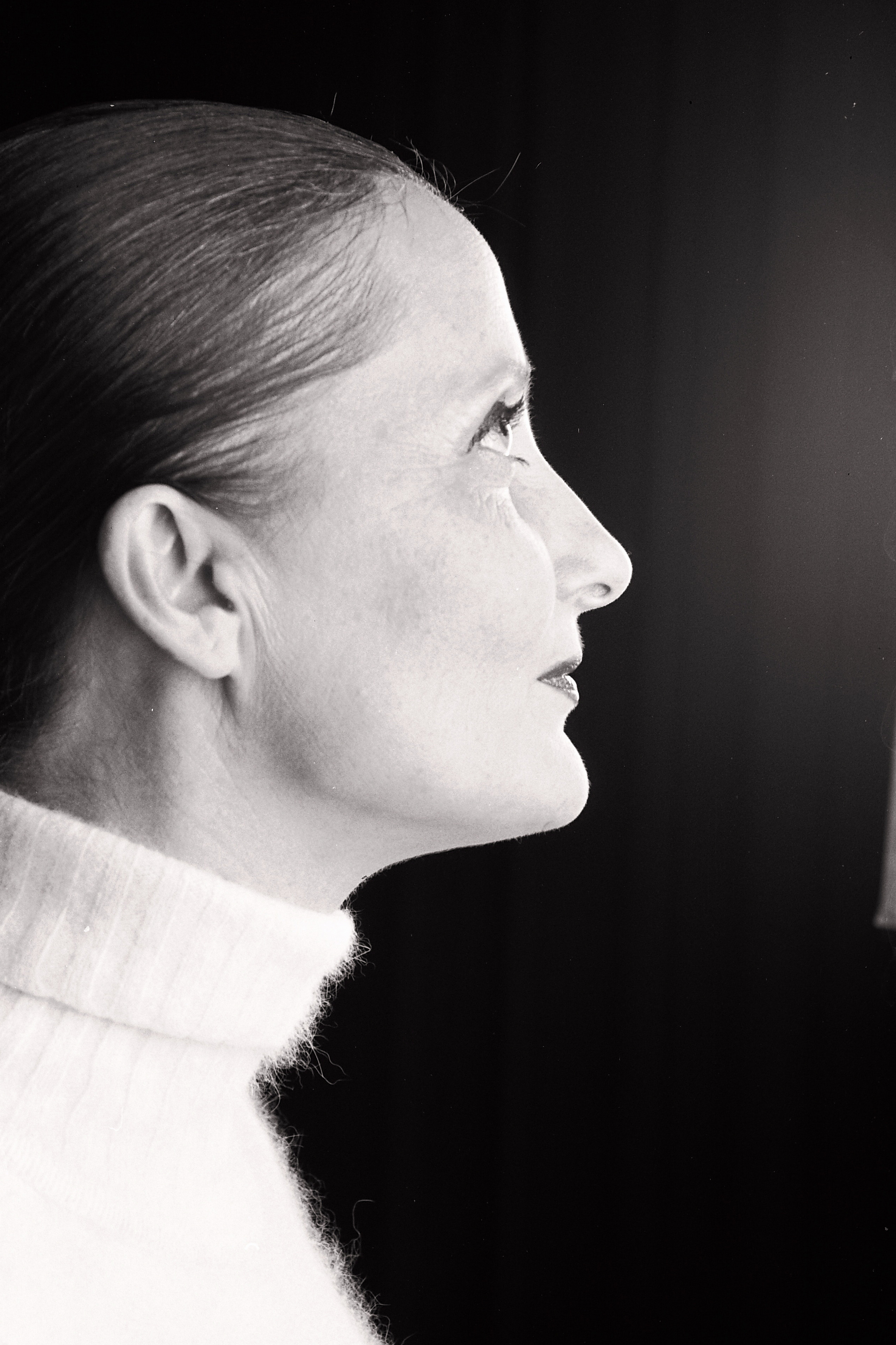
Portrait of Gordana Vlajic

Gordana Vlajić (Serbian Cyrillic: Гордана Влајић; born 1959) is an author and political activist in Serbia.

== Early life and career ==
Vlajić was born in Pančevo, Vojvodina, in what was then the People's Republic of Serbia in the Federal People's Republic of Yugoslavia. She graduated from the University of Belgrade Faculty of Political Sciences, majoring in journalism, and subsequently undertook studies in public relations in The Netherlands.

== Author ==
Vlajić has written the poetry collections Krivo mi je (2005) Izložba reči (2008), A, da stvarno odemo na kafu? (2010), and Usud (2018), as well as the prose books Roaming (2007; published under a pseudonym), Raščupane muškatle (2009), and Baba Budimka i čuvar gumenog zamka (2012). She has also written a number of works for children, including Moja mama najlepše kuva (1998), Mama, je l' sutra opet ideš na posao? (2000), Zaistinska srpska bajka (2015), Slovarica, prirode čuvarica (2016), Šarena lica mojih ulica (2017), and ZEDSI, hibridni roman za tinejdžere, mlađe i starije (2019). Her works have been translated into Polish, English, Macedonian, Arabic, Portuguese, French, Romanian, Hebrew, and Slovenian.

She is a program editor for Matice iseljenika i Srba u regionu, poetry editor for the Belgrade publishing house ARTE, a co-founder of Beogradski čitač, and the founder and editor of the children's magazine Ekopedija. She is a member of the Association of Writers of Serbia, the Association of Writers of Vojvodina, and Mensa.

== Political and administrative activities ==
Vlajić has worked in Pančevo's secretariat for environmental protection. She is a member of the Movement for the Restoration of the Kingdom of Serbia (Pokret obnove Kraljevine Srbije, POKS) and appeared on the party's electoral lists in the 2020 Serbian parliamentary election and the concurrent 2020 Vojvodina provincial election. The former list did not cross the electoral threshold; she received the fourteen position on the latter list and was not elected when it won five mandates.
