= Miloš Crnjanski =

Serbian writer (1893–1977)

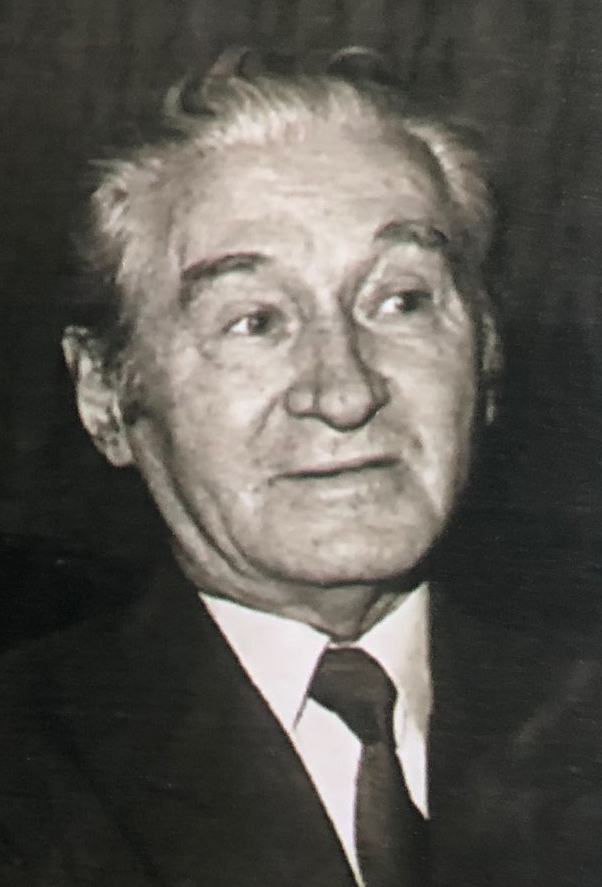
- Born: 26 October 1893; Csongrád, Austria-Hungary
- Died: 30 November 1977 (aged 84); Belgrade, SFR Yugoslavia
- Resting place: Belgrade New Cemetery
- Education: University of Vienna, University of Belgrade
- Occupations: Poet, writer, journalist, diplomat
- Spouse: Vida Ružić
- Writing career
- Language: Serbian
- Period: Avant-garde
- Genres: poetry, novel, short story, essay, travel literature, memoir
- Notable works: Migrations, Lament over Belgrade, The Journal of Carnojevic, A novel about London
- Notable awards: NIN award
- Movement: Expressionism

Miloš Crnjanski (Serbian Cyrillic: Милош Црњански, pronounced [mîloʃ tsrɲǎnski]; 26 October 1893 – 30 November 1977) was a Serbian writer and poet of the expressionist wing of Serbian modernism, author, journalist and a diplomat.

== Biography ==
Crnjanski was born in Csongrád (modern-day Hungary), to an impoverished family which moved in 1896 to Temesvár (modern-day Timișoara, Romania). He completed the elementary school in Pancsova (today Pančevo, Serbia), and Grammar school in Temesvár. Then he started attending the export academy in Fiume (today Rijeka, Croatia) in 1912, and in the autumn of the following year he started studying mathematics and philosophy in Vienna.

At the beginning of World War I, Crnjanski was persecuted as part of the general anti-Serbian retribution of Austria to Princip's assassination in Sarajevo. Instead of being sent to jail, he was drafted to the Austro-Hungarian Army and sent to Galician front to fight against the Russians – where he was wounded in 1915. Crnjanski convalesced in a Vienna war hospital, although just before the end of the war he was sent to the Italian front. After the war, he started studying comparative literature at the University of Belgrade. but he interrupted his studies to go to Vienna, Munich and Paris, spending the winter and Spring of 1921 travelling in France and Italy.

After graduating from the Faculty of Philosophy in 1922, he taught at the Fourth Belgrade Grammar School and espoused "radical modernism" in articles for periodicals including Ideje, Politika and Vreme – sparking "fierce literary and political debates".

In 1928 in a semi-diplomatic capacity, he spent a year in Berlin after joining the Central Press Bureau of the Yugoslav Government.

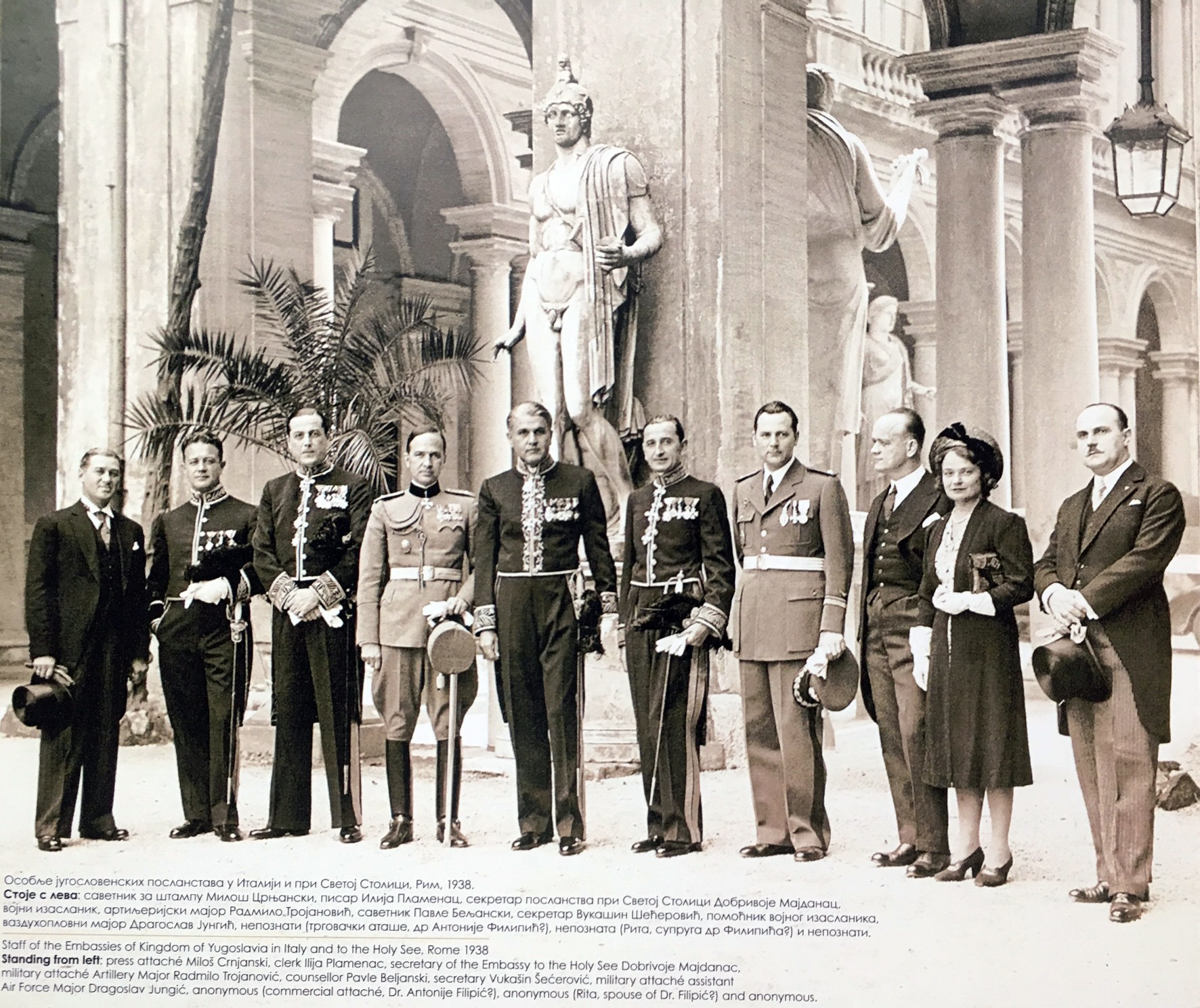
Crnjanski, and members of the Yugoslav embassy in Rome, 1939

He entered the diplomatic corps for the Kingdom of Yugoslavia and worked in Germany (1935–1938) and Italy (1939–1941) before being evacuated during WWII to England. He took odd-jobs and eventually became the London correspondent of the Argentinian periodical El economist. During this period he wrote Druga knjiga Seoba (The Second Book on Migration) and Lament nad Beogradom (Lament over Belgrade). He returned to Belgrade after 20 years of exile in 1965 and shortly after published Sabrana dela u 10 tomova (“Collected Works in 10 volumes”). In 1971, he received the prestigious NIN award for Roman o Londonu.

Crnjanski, aged 84, died in Belgrade on 30 November 1977. He is interred in the Alley of Distinguished Citizens in the Belgrade New Cemetery.

He is considered to be a classic of the Serbian literature by the scholars as well as the public.

== Works ==
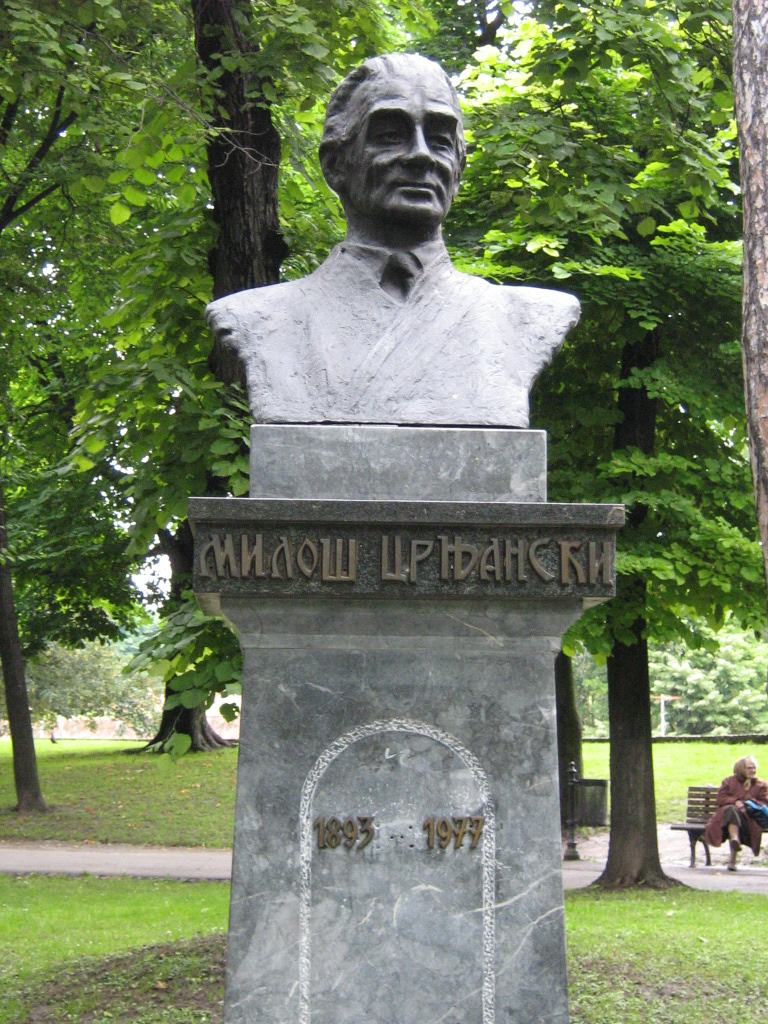
The bust of Crnjanski, Kalemegdan

Crnjanski's first books portrayed the futility of war. He laid the foundations of the early avant-garde movement in Serbian literature, as exemplified by his 1920 Objašnjenje Sumatre (The Explanation of Sumatra);

‘The world still hasn't heard the terrible storm above our heads, while shakings come from beneath, not from political relations, not from literary dogmas, but from life. Those are the dead reaching out! They should be avenged.’

Crnjanski published a large number of works of various subjects and contents:

=== Poetry ===
- Lyrics of Ithaca (1919)
- Chosen verses (1954)
- Lament over Belgrade (1965);

=== Tales ===
- Stories about men (1924)

=== Novels ===
- The Journal of Carnojevic (Dnevnik o Čarnojeviću, 1921)
- Migrations (Seobe, 1929)
- Second book of Migrations (Seobe, knjiga druga, 1962)
- Kod Hiperborejaca (1965)
- Kap španske krvi (1970)
- A Novel of London (Roman o Londonu, 1971)
- Suzni krokodil (unfinished)
- Podzemni klub (questionable)

=== Dramas ===
- Masks (1918)
- Doss-house (1958)
- Nikola Tesla

=== Itineraries ===
- Ljubav u Toskani (1930)
- Knjiga o Nemačkoj (1931)
- Pisma iz Pariza
- U zemlji toreadora i sunca

=== Other ===
- Sveta Vojvodina (1919)
- Antologija Kineske lirike, anthology (1923)
- Naše plaže na Jadranu (1927)
- Boka Kotorska – Der golf von Kotor (1928)
- Pesme starog Japana, anthology (1928)
- Sveti Sava (1934)
- Sabrana dela (1966)
- Stražilovo, poem (1973)
- Knjiga o Mikelanđelu, posthumous (1981)
- Embahade, posthumous (1985)
- Naša nebesa

=== Lost works ===
- Son of Don Kihot, novel
- O ljubavi, drama
- Gundulić, drama
- Prokleti knez, drama
- Juhahaha, comedy inspired by Peter I of Serbia
- The Shoemakers of London

Some of the works were destroyed by the author himself, while other manuscripts of the novel Son of Don Kihot was lost on the way to the print house. Some of his works are said to have been stolen in London. He also wrote many essays, articles, and other texts.

Migrations has been translated into English (Harvill 1994, ISBN 0-00-273004-9), but with the author's name transliterated as "Milos Tsernianski". Crnjanski wrote about forty texts about theater. Crnjanski also founded the newspaper Putevi, with Marko Ristić (1922), and Ideje, a political paper (1934). He also published two books on eastern nations poetry anthology.

A Novel of London has been translated to English by Will Firth about 50 years after its original appearance in Serbian (Diálogos 2020, ISBN 978-1-944884-66-6).

== See also ==
- Sumatraism
