= National Theatre in Niš =

Coordinates: 43.3205°N 21.9°E

- Нишко Народно Позориште
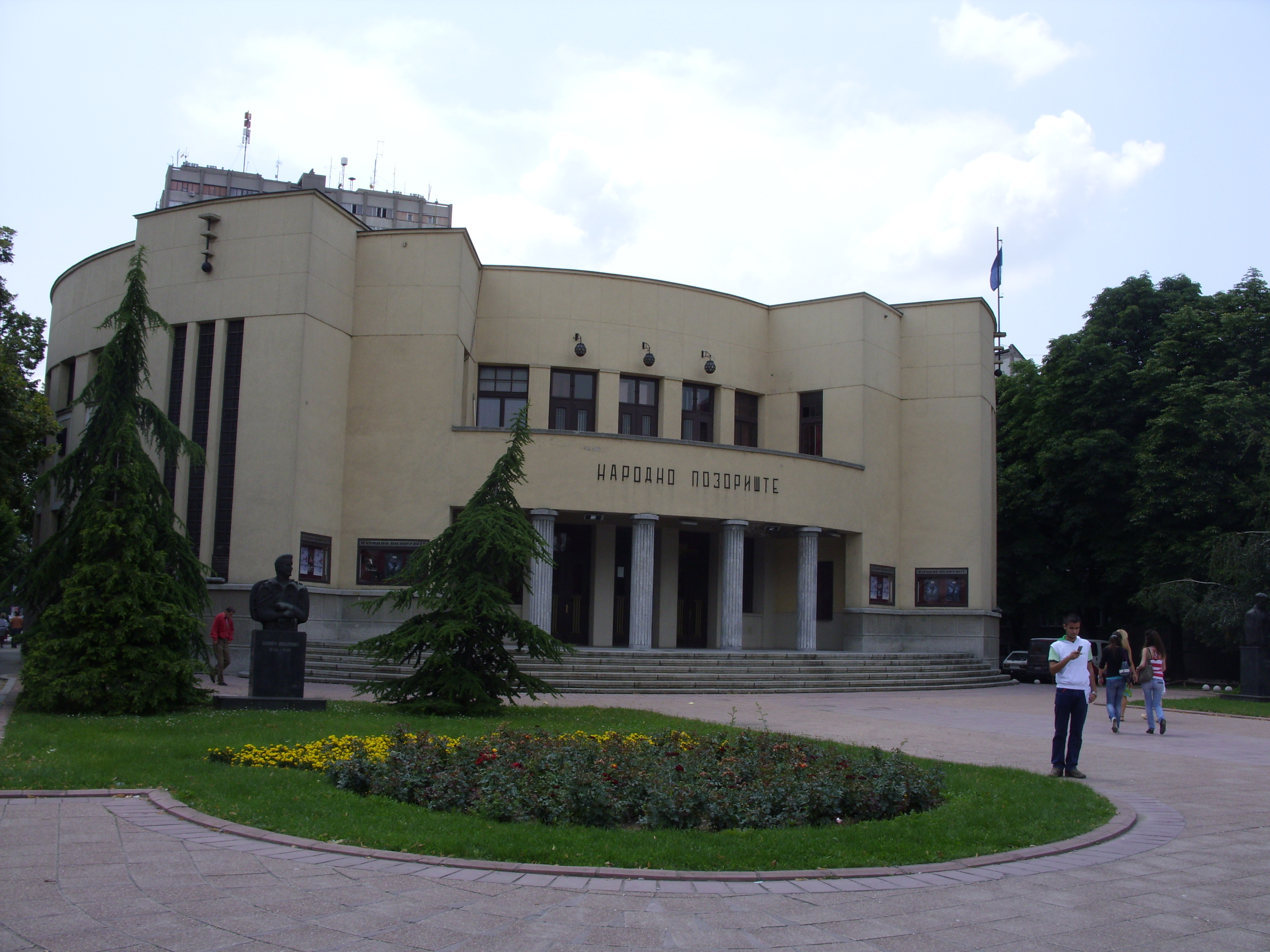
- National Theatre in Niš
- Interactive map of National Theatre in Niš
- Address: Sinđelić Square; Niš; Serbia
- Capacity: 687

Construction
- Opened: 11 March 1887 as "Sinđelić" Theatre
- Rebuilt: 1968, 1986, 2002/03
- Architect: Aleksandar Bugarski

Website
- www.narodnopozoristenis.rs

The National Theatre (Serbian: Народно позориште у Нишу, romanized: Narodno Pozorište u Nišu) is a theater located in Sinđelić Square, Niš, Serbia. It was founded in 1887 as "Sinđelić" Theatre, and reorganized in 1906 as National Theatre, following the completion of new theatre building.
