= Suzana Kostić =

- Born: 31 December 1961; Leskovac, Serbia
- Education: Ss. Cyril and Methodius University of Skopje
- Scientific career
- Fields: Conducting, Music Education
- Workplaces: University of Niš
- Website: www.artf.ni.ac.rs/index.php/dr-suzana-kostic/

Suzana Kostić (born 31 December 1961) is a Serbian conductor, music educator and music scholar. Her performance specialties are choral music and large-scale works for solo voices, chorus, and orchestra. She is also known for the premiere performances of works by contemporary Balkan composers.

== Education ==
She completed all her academic degrees at Faculty of Music, Ss. Cyril and Methodius University of Skopje. Kostić holds two B.M. degrees: in music theory and pedagogy (1984), and in conducting (1986), working with composer Toma Prošev, and conductor Fimcho Muratovski as her primary advisors. She studied with Dragan Šuplevski and earned her M.M. in choral conducting in 1991, and received a D.M.A. in conducting in 2008 under the supervision of Fimcho Muratovski and Dimitrije Bužarovski.

== Conducting ==
During her undergraduate studies she started working as an assistant conductor of the choir “Mirce Acev” in Skopje, led by Aleksandar Lekovski. She later established the children's choir AGM and became leader of the Youth Choir of the Cultural Center of Leskovac. Prior to joining the Academic Choir of the Student Cultural Center of Niš led by Milorad Veljković-Špaja, she worked with the choir EI, KUD Stanko Paunović as assistant of Radojica Milosavljević-Ica. She took over the leadership of the Academic Choir SKC in 1999.

Kostić conducted the Academic Choir SKC for thirteen years, and as a leader of this ensemble she realized numerous performances in Italy, France, Portugal, Poland, Austria, Turkey, Bulgaria, Greece, Macedonia, Slovenia, the Republic of Srpska, Ukraine and Russia. Moscow Radio Orfey often broadcast the live recording of the concert of this choir with Orthodox spiritual music held in Rachmaninov Concert Hall of the Moscow State Conservatoire in 2005. Her career as conductor of the Academic Choir SKC is documented on 5 CDs in edition of Student Cultural Centre of Niš, and in more than 50 audio and video recordings by public broadcasting services in Serbia and abroad.

She has collaborated with diverse soloists and music ensembles, and has also given performances with Niš Symphony Orchestra and the Symphony Orchestra and Choir of The National Radio Television of Serbia.

Kostić has performed extensive choral repertoire ranging from Renaissance to works by contemporary composers, with special interest in works by composers from the Balkans. Besides staging of Orff's Catulli Carmina and Carmina Burana, Stravinsky's Les Noces, Sviridov's Pushkin’s garland, Beethoven's Symphony No. 9 and Mozart's Coronation Mass, she has conducted the first performances of the following compositions:

- Lojze Lebić: Pohvala svetu (International Choral Festival of Niš in 1988)
- Srđan Jačimović: Mirska pjenija (International Choral Festival of Niš in 1996), Trahinjanke (ICF in Niš in 1994), La Honte, Madrigal srama (ICF in Niš in 1990), Akatist apostolu Andreju prvozvanom (2001)
- Aleksandar Vujić: Glorija (1997)
- Miroslav Štatkić: Harmonija svetlosti (International Choral Festival of Niš in 1998)
- Anatoly Kisselev: Vsenochno bdenie (International festival Radio Orfey Presents in Rachmaninov Concert Hall of the Moscow State Conservatoire, with the blessing and in honour of nameday of Patriarch Alexy II in 2005, International Choral Festival of Niš, City Assembly House in 2006)
- Dimitrije Bužarovski: Vocal symphony op. 53 (International Choral Festival of Niš in 2008, Foundation Day of the University of Niš in 2008, Festival of Youth Culture of Knjaževac in 2008, TEHO (Tetovo Chorus Echoes) in 2009, Skopje Summer Festival in 2009)
- Bratislav Petković: Urobor i InICIjacija (2009).

She has also given performances with orchestral music repertoire, among them: Brahms's Symphony no. 3, Beethoven's Leonore Overture No. 3, Mozart's Piano concerto in D-major, and Gershwin's Rhapsody in Blue and Concerto in F.

Kostić frequently collaborates with the National Theater of Niš and the Puppet Theater of Niš.

== Teaching ==
Kostić has been a professor in the University of Niš Faculty of Arts, teaching: conducting, choral singing, choir and orchestra, since the establishment of the school in 2002. Previously Kostić held a teaching position in the College of Music of Niš, which was predecessor school of the Faculty of Arts. She also taught piano accompaniment and orchestra playing at the music school “Stanislav Binički” in Leskovac, worked as music journalist in Radio Leskovac, and has been a visiting professor at the College of Teachers in Jagodina and the Faculty of Music, Ss. Cyril and Methodius University of Skopje.

== Writings ==
Her scholarly opus includes several textbooks for choral singing and conducting, as well as the monographs on International Choral Festival of Niš (2006) and ICF Score Collection – Mirror of the Festival (publication of her dissertation, 2010). She has been editor of the music magazine Aperto nuovo (previously Aperto), editor-in-chief of the Facta Universitatis peer-reviewed international journal, Series Visual Arts and Music (FU Vis Art Mus) (2015/16), and associate editor of the Encyclopedia of City of Niš, volume 5: Culture (2011) by the Serbian Academy of Science and Arts and the Lexicon of the City of Niš (2011) (Službeni glasnik Srbije). Suzana Kostić published the choral scores along with Academic Choir SKC CD, by the first composer from Niš, Stojan Andrić, in 2010. In addition, she has been the editor of International Choral Festival of Niš catalogues in 2004, 2006, 2008 and 2010.

== Professional and community service ==
Kostić was one of the founders of the Faculty of Arts at the University of Niš, vice-dean of the school, and currently she holds the position of the Dean of the School. She was a member of the Program board of the International Choral Festival of Niš from 2002 to 2008, and from 2004 to 2010, its artistic director. In addition she has been member of the program board of the NIMUS festival, Mokranjčevi dani festival, and vice-president of the management board of Niš Symphony Orchestra. She has also served as vice-president od City Council for Culture in 2003, and has been a member of the Scholarship Board of City of Niš in 2006. She has been frequently invited as a jury member of music competitions in Serbia and abroad.

== Awards ==
For her achievements she has been awarded with:

- The Best Debutante Award of the International Choral Festival of Niš in 1990 (for the performance of V Rukovet by Stevan Mokranjac).
- Special Award of Mokranjčevi dani in 1992.
- The Golden Badge Award of the Cultural Association of Serbia in 1994.
- The Golden Lyre Award of The College of Music in Niš in 1997.
- The Golden Badge Award of the International Choral Festival of Niš in 1998.
- Grand Prix of The International Choral Festival Yalta – Victoria in 2003.
- The Honorary Award for Interpretation and Conductory Mastership of the Kiev Conservatory in 2004.
- Special Award for performance of Eastern-Orthodox Music and Laureate Conductor Award of VIII MCYICE Festival in Moscow in 2004.
- Grand Prix and Laureate Conductor Award of the International Choral Festival Moscow Sounds in 2004.
- The Golden Fairy Award for virtuoso and innovative performance of the International Choral Festival Golden Fairy in Prijedor in 2007.
- Best Performance of Contemporary Music Award of the International Choral Festival Golden Fairy in Prijedor in 2008.
- Year Award of the National Theater of Niš in 2011.
- Charter of the Rotary Club of Niš (awarded for excellence in career and fostering of high ethical standards).
- The October Prize of the City of Leskovac in 2015.
