= The Parade (film) =

2011 film by Srđan Dragojević

Парада / Parada The Parade
- Theatrical release poster
- Directed by: Srđan Dragojević
- Written by: Srđan Dragojević
- Produced by: Vladimir Anastasov; Mike Downey; Igor Nola; Biljana Prvanović; Eva Rohrman
- Starring: Nikola Kojo; Miloš Samolov; Hristina Popović; Goran Jevtić; Goran Navojec; Dejan Aćimović; Toni Mihajlovski
- Cinematography: Dušan Joksimović
- Edited by: Petar Marković
- Distributed by: Filmstar
- Release date: 31 October 2011
- Running time: 112 min
- Country: Serbia
- Languages: Serbian; Croatian; Bosnian; Albanian
- Budget: €1.3 million
- Box office: €4.0 million

The Parade (Serbian: Парада, Parada) is a 2011 Serbian comedy-drama film, written and directed by Srđan Dragojević and released on 31 October 2011. The film, which deals with LGBT rights issues in Serbia, features footage of the 2010 Belgrade gay pride parade.

== Plot ==
A group of gay activists are trying to organize a pride parade in Belgrade. Among them is Mirko Dedijer, a struggling theater director who mostly makes a living by planning lavish and kitschy wedding ceremonies. Organizing such a parade is no easy task in Serbia as evidenced by the violence at the 2001 attempt. Now, almost a decade later, the situation is not much better – nationalist and right wing groups pose just as much threat particularly as the police refuse to secure the event. Mirko's effeminate boyfriend Radmilo, a veterinarian, is not as political and is content with keeping a low profile. Although the two try to live discreetly, both experience abuse from the homophobic majority.

In parallel, we meet Miško Drašković a.k.a. Limun, a macho Serbian veteran of the Yugoslav Wars in his mid-to-late forties. No stranger to criminal activities, divorced Limun operates a judo club that doubles as a bodyguard agency (whose clientele mostly consists of nouveau riche businessmen and female turbo-folk singers) while dating Biserka, a younger, low-brow ditzy trophy girlfriend who runs a beauty parlour. His son from a previous marriage, Vuk, works in an auto repair shop and is a member of a fringe right-wing skinhead group that attacks gay people.

The paths of the two couples cross. Radmilo performs a life-saving operation on Limun's beloved bulldog, the victim of a drive-by shooting that served as a warning to its master. Simultaneously, Biserka seeks out Mirko with a view of hiring him to plan hers and Limun's wedding. The eventual meeting of the two couples goes horribly wrong with Limun's violent and homophobic side emerging, which serves as the final catalyst for Mirko to leave Serbia for Canada (leaving Radmilo behind) and for Biserka to leave Limun.

Biserka decides to end contact with Limun but calls Mirko to apologize. Radmilo picks up the phone and, learning of the circumstances of Biserka and Limun, sees an opportunity and formulates a plan. He then shows up at Limun's agency/judo club offering Mirko's services in organizing his wedding party in return for Limun's personnel securing the gay parade. Limun reluctantly accepts, and, though Biserka returns to him, his club staff refuse to protect homosexuals, partly due to the likely reaction of their community. Seeing no other option, Limun decides to contact former wartime adversaries, most of them who engaged in petty smuggling across the borders during the Yugoslav wars. Limun and Radmilo embark on a recruiting trip all over ex-Yugoslavia.

They manage to sign up for their mission: Roko (45) a Croat war veteran who now runs a kafana, Halil (50) a Bosniak who owns a video rental parlour, and Azem (45) an Albanian from Kosovo who makes a living by selling drugs stolen via homing birds, mostly to the US troops stationed there.

When Limun's attempt to train the gay activists in martial arts fails, the skinheads refuse to be bought off and the police decline a bribe to protect the parade, the tiny group is attacked and brutalized, with Mirko getting killed before the police makes an intervention. However, thanks to this courage and effort, the film ends by celebrating a successful parade the following year protected by several thousand cops.

== Cast ==
- Nikola Kojo as Limun
- Miloš Samolov as Radmilo
- Hristina Popović as Biserka, Limun's girlfriend
- Goran Jevtić as Mirko, Radmilo's partner
- Goran Navojec as Roko
- Dejan Aćimović as Halil Zubović
- Toni Mihajlovski as Azem
- Nataša Marković as Lenka, gay activist
- Mladen Andrejević as Đorđe, gay activist
- Relja Popović as Vuk, Limun's son from a previous marriage
- Radoslav Milenković as Kecman, corrupt police inspector
- Mira Stupica as grannie Olga
- Marko Nikolić as Bogdan, Radmilo's father
- Branimir Popović as Zvonce
- Uroš Đurić as Kačamak
- Milan "Strongman" Jovanović as Afrika
- Milan Marić as Rešetka
- Bojan Navojec as Žuko, Roko's brother
- Saša Petrović as Ibro
- Anita Mančić as Tamara, Limun's ex-wife
- Mladen Nelević as Boro, assassin for hire
- Mirjana Đurđević as Radica, Boro's wife

== Production ==
According to its writer and director Dragojević, the film was conceived in summer 2001 while he watched the footage of the violence at the attempted gay pride parade in Belgrade. He wrote the first screenplay draft for Parada in 2004 before coming back to it in 2007 after failing to secure financing for his other film project titled 1999. In that time he experimented with framing the screenplay within different genres, but eventually decided that politically incorrect comedy is the best platform to tell this story. He penned the final version of the script over three weeks during summer 2008 while on vacation on the island of Mljet.

By fall 2009, Dragojević was ready to start shooting with the original plan being to shoot the parade scenes at the actual 20 September 2009 gay pride parade in Belgrade that ended up getting called-off due to security concerns. The shooting actually began a year later at the 2010 parade and continued in late March 2011 on locations in Croatia (Pag, Rab, and Obrovac) and Macedonia (Bitola).

According to one of its producers Biljana Prvanović, Parada cost €1.3 million to make and its funding came from European Council's Eurimages fund, Croatian Audio-Visual Center (HAVC), Serbian Ministry of Culture, Slovenian Ministry of Culture, Macedonian Ministry of Culture, and embassies of Germany, the Netherlands, and France in Belgrade as well as Serbian companies Dunav Osiguranje, Prva Srpska Televizija, and Serbia Broadband. Dragojević complained in interviews that over hundred companies in Serbia turned him down for funding due to not wanting to be associated with a gay-themed project.

Listed as the film's producers are: Biljana Prvanović of the Delirium Films from Serbia, Igor Nola from the Croatian Audio-Visual Center (HAVC), Eva Rohrman from Slovenia's Forum Film, Vladimir Anastasov from Macedonia's Sektor Film, and Mike Downey from the UK's Film and Music Entertainment (F&ME).

=== Director's statement ===
In the late 1970s, a small park just below Hotel Moskva in downtown Belgrade was the gathering place for some twenty of us, punk rock fans. The same park was the gathering place for homosexuals, too. Not far from us, these neatly dressed family men with impeccable socialistic biographies were looking for partners. Besides sharing the same location, we had just one more thing in common – both groups were repeated bashing targets for healthy looking, and "healthy" thinking young men. They couldn't stand the sight of us, with our safety pins, dyed hair and ragged clothes, as well as the other group, but only because of their different sexual orientation.

Over the following decades, Belgrade has seen much "weirder" looks than our silly clothing style that was just a mere revolt against the Socialist life. No-one gets bashed anymore because of the clothes they wear or the music that they listen to. But even today, in Serbia 2011, these "healthy" looking young men beat up men and women of a different sexual orientation not only in parks but also on the streets of Belgrade.

After the fall of the Milošević's regime, we thought that sexual minorities would finally gain their rights and dignity. In 2001, there was even an attempt to organize the first Pride Parade in the history of Serbia. The attempt ended in bloodshed – some thirty gay activists were brutally beaten up by football hooligans and neo-Nazis while the police just stood by doing nothing to stop this massacre. Images of this savage beating circled the globe and shattered the hope for young Serbian democracy, and the European Union revoked €50 million of financial help for Serbia. A decade later, nothing has improved in this regard.

On the contrary – with a "little help" from Orthodox church, a wide specter of quasi-democrat politicians in power and mass desperation and frustration induced by wild and brutal social-economic transition from the socialist-communist self-management model to capitalist free market economy, things have never been worse on the human rights front – especially LGBT rights. For me, three-year process to finish this film was much more than regular film making. Faced with threats from nationalist and neo-nazi organizations, shooting almost secretly, with constant lack of money, I have always had in mind that making Parada is my citizen's duty.

Now, when the film is done, I believe even more that Serbia badly needs this story in 2011, just as I believed, more than a decade ago, that my country needed a film that would speak about the war and guilt in a different voice from the official line. The result was Pretty Village, Pretty Flame and two years later The Wounds, with a movie theater audience of more than 1.5 million people overall. These two films were the first to spark the debate about the war and the responsibility for violent conflicts in ex-Yugoslavia.

I strongly believe that Parada will have a similar effect on the Serbian nation. They will scream, they will shout but – they're going to watch it. And when they watch it – maybe they will think and reconsider their prejudices and stereotypes toward those whose only guilt is that they're different. I was shooting the ending of Parada during last year's pride in Belgrade, the first "successful" Pride in Serbia's history. The only success was that participants stayed alive. Six and a half thousand policemen were protecting less than thousand gay activists & friends against seven thousand hooligans and neo-nazis. The result of the pride was 300 wounded policeman and hooligans and demolition of Belgrade's downtown.

I strongly believe that `The Parade` will help so we can enjoy happy and joyfull Pride in Belgrade in following years. Sometimes, Art can work in that way...

== Release and box office ==
=== General theatrical release ===
After the media screening on 28 October 2011, Parada premiered in Belgrade's Sava Centar on Monday, 31 October and in Serbian movie theaters from 1 November. Premiere in Novi Sad was held on November the 1st and in Niš on 18 November. In Montenegro, premiere took place in Podgorica on 16 November.

In late January 2012, Serbian government's Ministry of Education and Science (headed by cabinet minister Žarko Obradović and vice-minister Zoran Kostić, both from the Socialist Party of Serbia (SPS)) sent out a notice to school boards across Serbia about free screenings of Parada for principals and teachers of elementary and secondary schools, essentially recommending the movie as a work that promotes tolerance. The idea initiated by the movie's director Dragojević was to organize free screenings (the expense was covered by the film distributor and movie theater owners) for principals and teachers and then leave it up to their discretion whether they want to take their pupils to the cinema at a cut price as part of overall education on homosexuality. Dragojević managed to get the theater owners to cover the free screenings for principals and teachers because according to Zoran Cvetanović, the owner of Art vista theaters "the potential of a number of teenagers seeing the film, even at a cut price, meant increased business for us, especially since that demographic was noticeably absent during Parada's commercial theatrical run". Some, such as Miodrag Sokić, the president of Belgrade's gymnasia forum, criticized the fact that the Ministry decided to support someone's private commercial project: "In the last four years (since this ruling coalition has been in power), no other movie got a recommendation from the Ministry in this manner. Supporting a movie, even as an extracurricular activity, is meddling in the school curriculum and that is serious stuff. I don't blame the movie's director Dragojević, but I really have a problem with the Ministry's recommendation".

In March and April 2012, Serbian police arrested several individuals suspected of participating in online copyright infringement and illegal distribution of film copies.

The premieres in Bosnia and Herzegovina were respectively held, only in Republika Srpska entity, on 7 November in Bijeljina and on 10 December in Banja Luka,

In Croatia, premieres were held in December – December 12 in Zagreb, December 13 in Rijeka and December 14 in Split. For a time there were discussions over whether the film will be shown with subtitles in Croatia, but in the end the distributor decided against it. Much like in Serbia, the Croatian theatrical audience also responded in great numbers. After its first day of general release in the country on seven screens across Croatia, Parada was seen by 1,500 people, which according to the local distributor is on par with Hollywood blockbuster openings in Croatia. Initially projected to sell more than 60,000 admission tickets in the country, which would be more than all Croatian films combined sell recently in a single year, Parada ended up selling more than 150,000 thus overtaking 2005's Što je muškarac bez brkova? at the second spot of the Croatian all-time theater list (first is still 1996's Kako je počeo rat na mom otoku with more than 200,000). Final figure of tickets sold reached almost 170,000. In mid March the film got refused from Visia cinema in Dubrovnik that's managed by the Catholic Church's local diocese. Since that particular movie theater is the only operational one in the entire city, Parada effectively got banned from the city of Dubrovnik. Explaining the decision, Mate Uzinić, the bishop of Dubrovnik, listed two reasons for refusal of Parada – first, that it promotes sin and homosexual lifestyle, and secondly, that "it present a view of the Homeland War that the Dubrovnik Diocese can't get behind".

In Macedonia the premiere was held in Skopje on 16 December, followed by Bitola on the 17th. In Slovenia, the premiere was held in Ljubljana on December 20. By early March 2012, the film got a 'golden ribbon' in Slovenia for 25,000 admission tickets sold in the country's theaters. So far only Slovenian productions or co-productions were able to reach the figure, the last one being 2001's No Man's Land.

On 25 January, the film started playing in theaters in Bosnia and Herzegovina's other entity, Federacija BiH, though no special event premieres were held there. The movie soon reached the 18,000 admission tickets figure.

From 2 March, the film went into theatrical release in Austria, following a premiere at Vienna's UCI Kinowelt Millennium City multiplex.

=== Festival circuit ===
The film was accepted for the 2012 Berlinale's Panorama programme as the only film from former Yugoslavia out of twenty that applied for the festival. At the festival, the movie's producers struck a distribution deal for the French market with Sophie Dulac Distribution as well as a distribution deal for the Bulgarian market. The film had a premiere showing in Berlin on 13 February 2012, as well as two more press screenings. Parada received the Panorama Audience Award for feature film among 23,500 votes. It also won the Siegessäule (German LGBT magazine) readers' award as well as the Ecumenical Jury (representing the Protestant and Catholic Churches' international film organisations – Interfilm and Signis) special mention.

== Full list of international festivals and awards ==
Berlinale Film Festival Panorama Audience Award Fiction Film, Prize of the Ecumenical Jury, Reader Jury of the "Siegessäule" award

Torino GLBT film festival Audience award

Galway film festival Best international film award

Odesa Jury of the International Federation Of Film Clubs – Best Film

Freiburg film festival Audience award

Pula Zlatna Arena za najbolji scenario Zlatna Arena za najbolju glumicu – Hristina Popovic

Festroia – Setubal – Portugal Grand prix – Golden Dolphin Audience Award

Prishtina Red Goddess – Best Balkan film

MedFilm Rome Grand Prix

Montpellier film festival audience award

Festival Cinéma Méditerranéen de Bruxelles Prix du Public – audience award

Tirana International film festival best director award – Srdjan Dragojevic, best editor award – Petar Markovic

== Serbian Festivals and Awards ==
FIPRESCI award for best film and best actor in 2011.

Cinema City International Film Festival in Novi Sad Audience award

Sofest Sopot Best editor and best actress

Screenplay Festival Vrnjacka Banja Best original screenplay

The Parade is in selection with other 19 movies for "European Oscar" award of EFA (European Film Academy)

=== Admissions ===
Latest admission summation, on 1 April 2012 is:

Serbia / Montenegro / Republika Srpska (entity of Bosnia and Herzegovina) – 336,857

Federation of Bosnia and Herzegovina (entity of Bosnia and Herzegovina) – 23,000

Croatia – 163,227

Republic of Macedonia – 11,000

Slovenia – 31,588

Summary in region: 565,590

== DVD release ==
DVD release is scheduled for 3rd week of April. It contains a full-length theatrical movie version, Serbian and international trailer, and extras – 1 hour making of featuring Srdjan Dragojevic, Goran Jevtic, Nikola Kojo & Milos Samolov. Furthermore, audio commentaries from Srdjan Dragojevic, Nikola Kojo and Milos Samolov.

== Reaction ==
Press' Branko Rosić gave the film a highly favourable notice, comparing its "hilarious dialogues" to Dragojević's highly regarded earlier works, such as Lepa sela lepo gore and Rane.

Danas columnist and well-known Serbian novelist Svetislav Basara wrote about Parada in his regular column, praising its narrative form and extolling its virtue.

Another established Serbian writer, Marko Vidojković, devoted one of his columns in Kurir to the movie, describing the experience of watching Parada in one of Belgrade's multiplexes. Since at the time of his column, the movie was already a verified box office hit, approaching 200,000 admissions in Serbia alone, Vidojković praised Dragojević for "effectively organizing the biggest pride parade in the Balkans in his trademark Malcolm McLarenesque manner".

The movie's and its director's politics also sparked reaction in the Serbian non-mainstream and fringe media. Ajla Terzić of the far-left portal Peščanik refers to Parada as the cinematic equivalent of kavurma, a cheap cholesterol-filled dish that's "consumed by lowbrow and low income masses who do so because it is affordable, thus disregarding its horrendous nutritional effects". Božidar Maslać of the centre-right portal NSPM concentrated on the movie's poster in his notice, feeling that it "ripped-off the Belgrade Zoo logo" and seeing it as yet another plagiarism in Dragojević's cinematic career. Jelena Đurović's (of the far left-wing Agitpop) take on Parada is prefaced with an admission of a personal crush on Srđan Dragojević she developed back in the early 1990s when he first appeared on the Serbian public scene, which was followed by a long list of personal disappointments in him due to her having problems with the political, ideological, and sociological aspects of his career choices and movies. However, she likes the politics of Parada and claims to be back to square one with Dragojević.

Republika Srpska vice-president Emil Vlajki wrote at length about Parada in Fokus daily, seeing it as another tool of the US-sponsored "mental genocide" while labeling Dragojević "a talented director who sold his soul to the devil for fistful of dollars".

Following its 12 December premiere showing in Zagreb, Parada got a short affirmative notice from Večernji list's Milena Zajović. Similarly, after the Split premiere two days later, Slobodna Dalmacija's Marko Njegić wrote an affirmative report from the event.

Croatian novelist Ante Tomić wrote about Parada in his regular Slobodna Dalmacija column, praising it as "an example of marvelous artistic manipulation where the author shamelessly used horrendous politically incorrect technique to make a film that, when viewed as an overall unit, couldn't be more politically correct".

Mima Simić, Croatian film critic and an LGBT activist, touched on the film and its commercial success during her interview for BH Dani, calling it "calculated and cunning work whose main goal is to regain audiences of former Yugoslavia and win Western markets". She further thinks the subject of gay rights as a symbol of transition in eastern Europe is "a gold mine that Dragojević is fully taking advantage of". She concludes by saying the film shows the Balkans are beginning to understand that "it's not really OK to beat up gays".

In parallel with its domestic theatrical success, Parada started receiving notices and getting reviewed abroad. One of the first notices was Paul Canning's on international LGBT website Care2 followed by a notice in Screen International as the film posted great numbers in Serbian and Croatian cinemas. It was also the subject of an affirmative entry by Phil Hoad on his blog on The Guardian website.

With the film's showing at the 2012 Berlinale, Parada received affirmative notices in major outlets such as Reuters, Der Spiegel, Agence France-Presse, and L'Orient Le Jour, as well as online outlets such as Gay Star News, Splitsider, and Europa.

Following the Catholic Church's decision to ban the film in Dubrovnik, Parada got a notice from Associated Press as well as another one from Reuters.

== Critical reception ==
=== Serbia ===
In the mainstream Serbian print media, the film received generally positive reviews and notices. Politika's Dubravka Lakić stated that, by "employing shallow, occasionally lowbrow humour delivered through effective jokes and quick yucks", Dragojević made a "thoroughly watchable, rhythmically populist film that sends out a call to tolerance and a message that love always triumphs".

Blic's Milan Vlajčić classified the film as a "bitterly unbridled comedy that significantly departs from what usually constitutes a situation comedy in Serbia". He went on to compare Parada's "uncontrolled and slightly anarchic humour, filthy street lingo, and playing with stereoypes" with Mel Brooks' Producers and Ernst Lubitsch's Ninotchka, concluding that Dragojević "avoided banal moralizing while packing the film with funny stereotypes".

Danas' Pavle Simjanović compares aspects of Parada with Mike Nichols' The Birdcage and even Norman Jewison's The Russians Are Coming, the Russians Are Coming while expressing concern that Dragojević's film won't have the intended effect of "ridding the stubborn majority of its phobias towards this stigmatized minority" because the director at some point stopped making a comedy and instead turned to creating a political pamphlet.

The movie got its most glowing review from Miroljub Stojanović writing in NIN magazine who sees Parada as "an uncompromising, subtle, and primarily intelligent film, which examines today's Serbia with such minutia that it possess all the qualities of hyperrealism". He concludes by saying that "Parada is not only the Serbian society's ultrasound, it is its MRI".

Writing for B92 radio-television's web portal, in a mixed review Slobodan Vujanović feels that though it causes many of the film's faults, Parada' topicality is a sign of bravery and virtue on Dragojević's part. He further sees "this satirical comedy with a sad ending" as a "rough, arrogant, objective, and angry criticism of our society as well as the sociopathic nature of some inhabitants of former Yugoslavia who don't mind being soaked in human blood up to their elbows, but won't be caught dead shaking hands with a faggot". While approving of Parada' comedic aspects, Vujanović has issues with the moral stance of its satirical ones, feeling that some the film's cliche characters, especially the former wartime adversaries "all of whom are psychopaths who engaged in some horrible stuff during the war", receive an undue redemption.

The reviews in the Serbian online media are more mixed. Although he still gave Parada passing marks, Popboks' Đorđe Bajić has problems with the film's overall tone and its "lack of tact and subtlety", concluding that it "hits the target when it comes to delivering a loud and unconstrained pastime, but fails when it tries to be anything more than that". The review by KakavFilm.com is essentially more of the same while the review published by Filmovanje.com feels Parada could've been a great movie had Dragojević been more direct, brave, and worthwhile" concluding that "as it is, at times, you're not sure whether you're watching Tesna koža or Šišanje". Writing for far-left portal E-novine, Vladan Petković was extremely critical, seeing Parada as "nothing more than a marketing trick" while citing its main problem to be the fact that "protagonists are caricatures while antagonists are stereotypes". He continues: "Dragojević tried his hardest to pack the film with witty dialogues and thus provide new material for the Balkan movie audiences' favourite activity – citing movie one-liners. And I must say I laughed a few times at some (albeit rare) original jokes, but for that to truly work well, the movie must be good as a whole unit (such as Maratonci..., Ko to tamo peva, Varljivo leto '68, Kako je propao rokenrol...), which Parada isn't. It stays in the realm of politically correct fuck-about that's camouflaged in political incorrectness". On the other hand, Marko Radojičić of medio.rs gave Parada a particularly favourable review, praising its casting, direction, attention to detail as well as its overall message, and City Magazine gave the film another glowing review, calling it Dragojević's best work. The film also received online notices from Slobodan Georgijev in BalkanInsight.

=== Bosnia and Herzegovina ===
Though still not widely reviewed, it got a negative notice from RS newspaper Nezavisne novine's Branko Tomić who commends the movie's trailer, but reprimands Dragojević for "not being brave enough to shake up Serbia out if its slumber by showing it a passionate gay kiss". He further feels that the public set "big social expectations for the movie based upon the trailer and the director's earlier works", but thinks they will not be met and that the movie will disappear in the viewers' minds shortly after leaving the theater.

Though it did not start playing in Federation BiH's cinemas until 25 January, Parada got some online reviews even before that date. Mirko V. Ilić of depo.ba gave the film a negative review, seeing it as a "mixture of camp comedy (first 100 minutes) and drama about two Serbias (the rest of the film)" and labeling the former "solid, well directed, and not bad" and the latter "unbearably bad". He further feels the movie is calculated and disingenuous for not showing a gay kiss and thinks "the movie will not help cure the Balkaniod Belgrade whose prominent representative is also Dragojević himself judging by his previous films".

=== Croatia ===
Vjesnik published a positive review with Božidar Trkulja seeing Parada to be about various forms of love, which Dragojević "skillfully mixes and frames into a compact, humour-laden, and pleasant cinematic experience".

The review by Jutarnji list's Jurica Pavičić is punctuated by his claim that "gifted cynic Dragojević who primarily possesses propensity and capacity for ridicule and whose previous movies are built on superior and often antipathetic sarcasm ... has finally delivered something which he never did before – a movie with lots of tenderness". In between comparing aspects of Parada with films by Akira Kurosawa and John Sturges, Pavičić praises the actors, criticizes the film's production design, and concludes by praising Parada as a "lovable, shamelessly and purposely populist work that gives you a bitter political lesson wrapped in cotton candy".

Writing in Novosti, the weekly aimed at the Serb minority in Croatia, Damir Radić gives the film an extremely negative review, feeling that Dragojević "turned to hyperbolization of stereotypes, both gay and ethnic, in order to be ideologically controversial as well as to, through populism, attract a large audience, all of which would've been fine had the movie been uproariously funny, but it is dominantly unfunny and, as it goes on, increasingly boring". He further reproaches Dragojević for "drastically losing the rhythm" and calls him out for "ideological malice which the director already exhibited previously in Lepa sela lepo gore and now continued in Parada through the Albanian narcodealer character who is not only the most deplorable of all criminals in the multiethnic group, but also has the most perverse sexual habits having once engaged in a sexual act with a zebra and giving it an STD, all of which is supposed to be funny".

Mladen Šagovac of moj-film.hr concentrates more on Parada's political than stylistic aspects in his positive review, and in this regard singles out the character of Mirko "whose transformation from effeminately feeble gay person into a confrontational one represents both a call to reason and a war cry that will surely serve to soften the bizarre, nationalistically-rooted, anti-gay views of the people across Balkans". Marcella Jelić of tportal.hr gave Parada a negative review, feeling Dragojević made "a series of morally deeply problematic decisions in the film, the most obvious of which is presenting hardened criminals, chauvinists, war profiteers, and thugs as sympathetic and charming characters". She concludes by exclaiming: "Still, I'd be willing to forgive all of its shortcomings had Parada been truly funny, but it isn't except in a few rare moments. As it is, its only saving grace is that its noble aim justifies its means. It's just too bad its means are so boring". Robert Jukić of film-mag.net also didn't like the film, seeing it as "a fairly uneven product that balances between comedy and drama in which Dragojević sinks his teeth into some hot topics such as corruption and war profiteering, but the end result is pale and aloof". He also feels its humour is forced and pandering while expressing doubt whether the movie will appeal to Croatian cinema-going public "because homophobia is not such a big problem in our country like it is in the neighbouring one".

All Srdjan Dragojevic's Parades

=== Slovenia ===
review by Delo – the greatest Pride Parade review by Simon Popek

=== Abroad ===
With its showing at the 2012 Berlinale, the movie started getting reviewed abroad.

Calling Parada "a rude and raunchy challenge to Balkan homophobia", Screen International's Mark Adams praises "broad comedy fare that revels in its stereotyping and takes no prisoners" as well as Dragojević for "directing with a good deal of intelligence and being very much aware that his unsubtle characters offer an entertaining look at the culture clash between brutal Balkan machismo and a gay community".

On the other hand, Jay Weissberg of Variety disliked the movie very much, writing: "Parada sees itself as a genial satire, but Srđan Dragojević's tired and tiresome caricatures are just embarrassing. Using formulaic traits – effeminate gay men, over-macho nationalists – to convince audiences to confront their homophobia might work for anyone still thinking Paul Lynde is fresh, but viewers who've watched gay-themed pictures mature since the 1970s will cringe at this naively well-meaning but hopelessly dated farce".

In The Hollywood Reporter, Karsten Kastelan writes, "In this hilarious, raunchy comedy directed by Srdjan Dragojevic, a homophobic gangster is charged with protecting a gay pride parade in Belgrade".

Paul Hockenos reviewed the film in Boston Review in July 2012.

== Awards ==
=== Serbia ===
Fipresci Srbija – best feature film in 2011.

Fipresci Srbija – Nikola Kojo – best male role in 2011.

=== International ===
Berlin International Film Festival 2012: Panorama Audience Award for Fiction Film

Prize of the Ecumenical Jury – Special Mention

Reader Jury of the "Siegessäule" at 26th Teddy Awards
