= Trivalia =

- Trivalia in 1992

Background information
- Origin: Niš, Serbia
- Genres: Gothic rock; post-punk; darkwave; industrial music; Byzantine music; alternative rock; electronic body music
- Years active: 1986–1994
- Labels: Black Rider, SKC Niš, Happy House, DOM
- Past members: Vladimir Žikić; Boban Stojiljković; Srđan Jovanović; Ivan Marković; Miloš Vukotić; Ivan Litovski; Miloš Medić; Peđa Avramović

Trivalia (Serbian Cyrillic: Тривалиа) was a Serbian and Yugoslav gothic rock/industrial band formed in Niš in 1986. Led by vocalist and principal songwriter Vladimir Žikić "Mantis", Trivalia combined gothic rock, industrial music and darkwave with influences of Byzantine music and other musical genres.

== History ==
=== 1986-1994 ===
The band was formed during the summer of 1986 in Niš by vocalist Vladimir Žikić "Mantis", also known under the pseudonym "Vlad-a-Mantis" (formerly of the band Bigoti, the band's principal songwriter as well as the rhythm machine sequencer), Srđan Jovanović "Điđa" (guitar), and Boban Stojiljković "Bocko" (formerly of Bigoti, bass guitar). During the years, the band collaborated with a number of musicians from Niš; on a number of occasions they performed with drummer Miloš Medić and keyboardist Peđa Avramović. The band was named after Tribalia, the homeland of the Triballi, an ancient Thracian tribe that lived in modern southern Serbia and western Bulgaria.

Starting with a lot of already written material, in 1987 the band recorded their debut EP We Always..., inspired lyrically by religion, mythology, secret societies and musically predominantly by movie soundtracks and the popular post-punk and gothic rock acts such as Joy Division, The Sisters of Mercy, The Mission, The Cure and Fields of the Nephilim. The album was released independently by the band themselves on compact cassette only, which would be the case with several of their future releases. Beside the recorded material, on live appearances the band also performed cover versions of the bands they were citing as their influences. Their live appearances usually had a form of art performances, featuring stage decorations, video and light effects.

From 1988 to 1989, the band performed rarely due to Stojiljković's mandatory stint in the Yugoslav army. On his return, the band recorded new material featuring a combination of gothic rock, darkwave and industrial music with the elements of Byzantine music, independently released on the EP Pravoslavia (Orthodoxia). The EP, featuring the songs "Popečenije" ("Ministry"), "Praviteljstvujušči sovjet serbski" ("The Ruling Council of Serbia"), "Pričes" ("Eucharist") and "Blagosloven Gospod" ("Praised Be the Lord"), did not include drum recordings, and the band instead used the Edic rhythm machine both on studio and live performances. In late 1989, Jovanović left the band, being replaced by Ivan Marković "Parsifal".

In 1990, the new lineup recorded several new tracks which, beside the selection of the previously recorded material, appeared on the compilation album Telo i duša (Body and Soul), released in a limited printing of 50 copies by the band's own independent record label Black Rider. The name of the label was inspired by the Black Riders from J. R. R. Tolkien's The Lord of the Rings. For a period of time the band issued the fanzine entitled Black Rider, and Žikić hosted a radio show with the same title on the Niš Belle Amie radio. During the same year, the band released the EP Dat Rosa Mel Apibus (Latin for The Rose Gives Honey to the Bees), inspired by the Rosicrucian Order and featuring three songs: "Ruža i krst" ("Rose and Cross"), "U sobi" ("In the Room") and "Blede ruke volim tako mnogo" ("Pale Hands I Love So Much"). Printed as a limited edition 7-inch EP by Jugoton, the EP was released in March 1991 by the Niš Students' Cultural Centre. The song "Ruža i krst" had quickly become a minor hit, providing the band with an opportunity to perform as an opening act for Električni Orgazam, KUD Idijoti and U Škripcu. After the EP release, the new band member had become Miloš Vukotić (guitar, vocals, keyboards).

In late 1991, the band released religiously-oriented album Crna voda (Black Water), thematically inspired by the book The Holy Blood and the Holy Grail and musically by the film The NeverEnding Story, featuring darker and heavier sound than their previous releases. The album, produced by Dejan Glozić and released by Happy House records, featured guest appearances by the guitarists Dejan Šišnjić and Goran Savić. Beside the new tracks, the album featured the rerecorded versions of "Ruža i krst" and "U sobi", this time more guitar-oriented. The band had also appeared in the Television Belgrade show Afirmator 2. After the album release, the band held several local performances in Niš, including the 21 May 1992 performance at the M Pub, featuring, beside their material, cover versions of songs by The Ramones, The Sisters of Mercy and Kraftwerk.

The studio album Headhunter, released in 1992, for the first time featured the material with the lyrics entirely in English language. The album, featuring electronic body music influences, mainly acquired by the band members through the works of the bands Skinny Puppy, Front Line Assembly, Klinik and Front 242, was released by the Dobri Isak frontman Predrag Cvetičanin's indie record label DOM. After the album release, the band was joined by Ivan Litovski as the new guitarist, and released the compilation album Body Collection. The album featured a new version of the song "Headhunter", a cover version of Kraftwerk single "Das Model", and two recordings from their 1992 M Pub performance. After the compilation release, in early 1994, the band had disbanded.

=== Post breakup ===
In 1996, the recordings from the band's concert held on Halloween in the Niš Medical Faculty students club was released on the live album Halloween Nights. During the same year Žikić, under the Trivalia moniker, released the album Instant God. After the release of the album, he withdrawn from the scene. He gained a PhD in biology at the University of Belgrade Natural Sciences and Mathematics Faculty, gaining an employment as a professor at the University of Niš Faculty of Science and Mathematics biology and ecology department.

Miloš Vukotić formed the band Ružne Religiozne Lutke (Ugly Religious Dolls), with which he recorded the album TV je mrtav (TV Is Dead), released in 1998.

== Discography ==
=== Studio albums ===
- Crna voda (1991)
- The Headhunter (1992)
- Instant God (1996)

=== Live albums ===
- Halloween Nights (1996)

=== Extended plays ===
- We Always... (1987)
- Pravoslavia (1989)
- Dat Rosa Mel Apibus (1990)

=== Compilation albums ===
- Telo i duša (1990)
- Body Collection (1992)
