= Ejdus =

Ejdus (Serbian Cyrillic: Ејдус) is a Serbian surname. Notable people with the surname include:

- Predrag Ejdus (1947–2018), Serbian actor
- Vanja Ejdus (born 1976), Serbian actress, daughter of Predrag
