= The Open Communication =

Intercollegiate debating league in Serbia

- Formation: 1997.
- Type: Student debating organization
- Headquarters: Belgrade
- Location: Belgrade, Serbia
- President: Katarina Lazić
- Website: http://www.ok.org.rs

The Open Communication Universities Debating Network (Serbian: Отворена комуникација/ Otvorena komunikacija) was founded in 1997 in Belgrade. Founded by both professors and students, it was established as an organization which promotes civic discourse, non-violent communication, critical thinking, argumentative presentation of ideas, public speaking as a form of free speech and the use of parliamentary debate as an educational and promotional tool.

== Working with students ==
Preserving the same goals, Open Communication has been working in three University centers (Belgrade, Novi Sad, Niš) and now has more than 150 active members out of over 850 students that passed its parliamentary debate training program. It currently encompasses 5 debate clubs, among which the Belgrade Law School Debate Club was formed first in 1997. The Club has been functioning since its foundation even during the times when its activities were banned. During that period the Law School Debate Club organized its activities as part of the Alternative Academic Network and Belgrade Open School. However, since the democratic changes in Serbia in 2000, the Law School Debate Club has continuously received generous financial and institutional support from the School of Law.

== International recognition ==
Open Communication is a recognized member of International Debate Education Association (IDEA) and the Serbian representative in the European Universities Debating Council, currently holding the office of Vice President, and it successfully cooperates with numerous international, regional and local organizations through international tournaments and seminars.

== Goals ==
The primary goals and activities of this organization include:

- promoting debate through faculty-based clubs;
- organizing seminars, debate tournaments and debate academies;
- organizing expert lectures, panel discussions and public debates;
- pursuing all forms of tolerant, rational and open communication to promote it as political and educational means, as well as a powerful tool for civil initiative and action.

Organizing public debates has been one of the activities of Open Communication in recent years. The organization states that raising public awareness and educating students about communication through argumentation is among its goals.

== Regional activities ==
Open Communication is also active in promoting debating around the region. Trainers who are members of the network have held workshops in Austria, Hungary, North Macedonia and Montenegro over the past year.
