= Milan Marić =

Milan Marić may refer to:

- Milan Marić (actor, born 1981), Serbian actor
- Milan Marić (actor, born 1990), Serbian actor
