= Pekic =

Pekic is a surname. Notable people with the surname include:

- Borislav Pekić (1930–1992), Serbian writer and political activist
- Damir Pekič (born 1979), Slovenian football player
- Dušan Pekić (1980—2000), Serbian actor
- Petar Pekić (1896–1965), Croatian historian
- Sofija Pekić (born 1953), Serbian basketball player
