= Akil Mark Koci =

Albanian composer (born 1936)

Akil Mark Koci (born 1936) is a Kosovar Albanian composer and music writer.

== Education ==
Koci was born in 1936 in Prizren, Kingdom of Yugoslavia (in today's Kosovo). There he graduated from the Josip Slavenski music school. He went on to study at the Sarajevo Music Academy, graduating in 1962 and specialising in music theory. He furthered his studies at one of the oldest conservatories in Germany, the Staatliche Hochschule für Musik und Darstellende Kunst Stuttgart, specialising in composition under the noted professor and composer, Milko Kelemen.

Koci also studied under Toma Prošev at the Music Academy in Skopje and was awarded his master of arts by Zija Kučukalić in Sarajevo.

As a German government DAAD scholarship holder he continued his specialisation at the Hochschule für Musik Hanns Eisler in Berlin in his main field of interest, instrumental music.

Just after his studies, Koci worked at an electronic studio running three programmes for Radio Belgrade, with composer Vladan Radovanović.

== Career ==
Koci's musical idiom is markedly contemporary based on the achievement of European modern music. His works often are aleatoric, dodecaphonic and usually non-thematic. As one of the most distinguished representatives of Albanian contemporary music, his works have been performed in almost all European and many non-European countries as well as in music festivals at home and abroad.

Akil Mark Koci is one of the founders several festivals of contemporary instrumental music, such as Music Scene, Pristina; Days of Kosovar Music, Đakovica; and the Kosova Music Accords, Pristina. He is also a regular participant in numerous festivals of contemporary music, notably the Music Biennale Zagreb, UNESCO Festivals of Contemporary Music, Paris, and Tribunes of Music in Opatija, Dubrovnik, Belgrade, Sarajevo, Tirana, Warsaw and others.

Koci was a professor of musicology at the Faculty of Arts of the University of Pristina. He is the recipient of several national and international awards. At different times, he occupied the posts of Secretary, Vice-President and President of the Kosovar Composers' Society as well as the President and Vice-President of the Music Society of Yugoslavia.

He is actively engaged in the domain of composition and musicology. In the scope of the latter, he has written over 250 critiques, essays and musical analyses published in various newspapers and magazines. Koci is a member of the editorial board of the music magazines Zvuk, and Nota.

Koci also host the podcast Fjala dhe Muzika, an arts programme.

The highest prize of International Competition of Classical Music Pristina, the Akil Koci Prize for outstanding performances of pieces by Albanian composers, is named in his honor.

He lives in London.

== Tributes ==
A tribute concert held in Zagreb and hosted by the Croatian Composers' Society to celebrate the composer's 70th birthday.

A second tribute concert was held in Pristina on 25 May 2007 at the Red Hall, with the participation of the Kosovo Philharmonic Orchestra.

On 29 June 2007, he was presented with a ceremonial plate in honour of his 70th birthday by His Excellency Kastriot Robo, Albanian Ambassador to the United Kingdom.

Together with Noel Malcolm, he is joint recipient of the honorific title 'Ambassador of Albanian culture'.

In February 2015, he was awarded the Presidential Medal of Merit by the President of Kosovo.

In November 2016, Koci was presented with the Order of the Grand Master of the Republic of Albania by the Albanian President.

In October 2018, he was awarded the Nikete Dardani award for lifetime achievement by the Minister of Culture of Kosovo.

== Discography ==
- Koci, A.M., Filigranët I & II, Superstrukturat, (album) Jugoton Zagreb, 1973 (LSY 61239)
- Koci, A.M., Ab aeterno (album), Jugoton Zagreb, 1974 (LSY 61239)
- Koci, A.M., Sokoli e Mirusha (album), Jugoton Zagreb, 1974 (LSY 63067)
- Koci, A.M., Kënga e Rexhës (album), Jugoton Zagreb, 1983 (LSY 62086)

== Bibliography ==
- Koci, A.M., Portrete të kompozitorëve shqiptarë në Jugosllavi, Prishtina, 1971.
- Koci, A.M. (ed.), Jugoslovanska glasbena dela, Drzavna Zalozba Slovenije, Ljubljana, 1980.
- Koci, A.M., Vibracione të shpirtit shqiptar, Librarium Haemus, Bucharest, 2008.
- Koci, A.M., Vibracione të shpirtit shqiptar, vol. 2, Misioni Katolik Shqiptar, Zagreb, 2009.
- Koci, A.M., Aspektet filozofike dhe estetike në simfonitë e Beethovenit, Koha Publishers, Prishtina, 2009.

== See also ==
- List of compositions by Akil Mark Koci by musical genre.
- Akil Koci Prize
- Fjala dhe Muzika Podcast

== Sources ==
- Youth Music. "Composer Biographies" Online https://web.archive.org/web/20070616103041/http://www.singbook.org.uk/composer_akil.jsp Accessed January 20, 2007.
- YouTube. "Akil Koci 70th birthday concert" Online https://www.youtube.com/watch?v=E4KEvsjMAsg Accessed August 24, 2007.
