= Milan Jovanović (strongman) =

Serbian power lifter

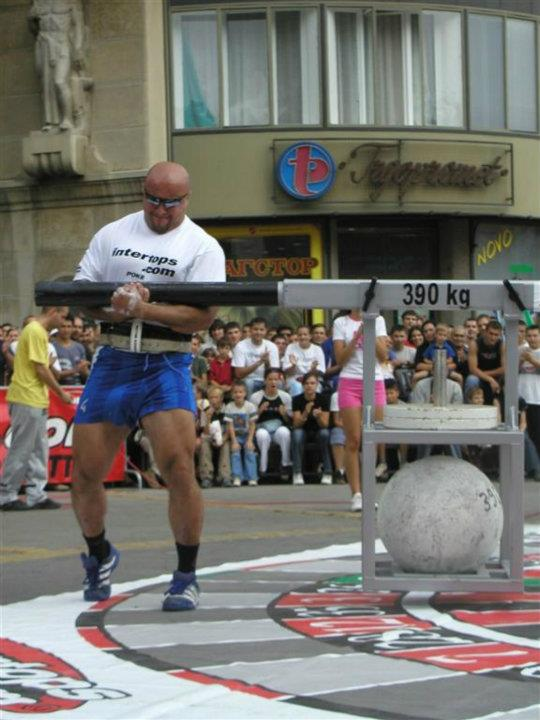
- Jovanović in 2005

Personal information
- Nicknames: Strongman, Milan Strongman, Ribcracker Savage
- Nationality: Serbian
- Born: February 5, 1970 (age 56) Niš, SR Serbia, SFR Yugoslavia
- Education: University of Niš
- Occupation(s): Powerlifter, strongman, bodyguard, personal trainer
- Height: 6 ft 4 in (1.93 m)
- Weight: 310 lb (140 kg)
- Spouse: Jovana
- Website: www.milanstrongman.com

Sport
- Sport: Powerlifting
Medal record
Men's Equipped Powerlifting
World Championships
Gold medal – first place	2000 WPA Lancaster	125 kg
Gold medal – first place	2004 WPC Vienna	140+ kg
European Championships
Bronze medal – third place	2002 GPC Schmölln	140+ kg
Masters World Championships
Gold medal – first place	2010 GPC Prague	M1 140 kg

Milan Jovanović (Serbian Cyrillic: Милан Јовановић; born February 5, 1970) is a former WPA and GPC world multi-ply powerlifting champion and a strongman competitor. He is sometimes known by the nickname Ribcracker. He is also a writer and blogger.

== Sporting career ==
Jovanović started powerlifting in 1998 and won nine Serbian national championships in a row. He achieved his major success in powerlifting at the international level by winning the 2000 WPA world title in Lancaster, Pennsylvania and the 2003 WPC world title in Wien, Austria when he finished first overall with 936 lbs in squat.

In 2003 Jovanović entered his first Strongman competition, which was held in his native Niš, Serbia. He achieved his major success at the international level in 2005 when he finished fifth overall in the United Strongman Series competition. In 2006 he was injured and retired from competition.

In September 2010 he made a successful return, taking part at the GPC worlds RAW competition held in Prague, Czech Republic.

=== Personal bests ===
- Bench press - 628 pounds (285 kg)
- Squat - 1000 pounds (430 kg)
- Deadlift - 794 pounds (361 kg)

== Bodyguarding career ==
After injury he moved to the United States and became a bodyguard in Miami, Florida, working for celebrities including Mickey Rourke and Kimbo Slice, Shaquille O'Neal, and Jenna Jameson. According to Bas Rutten, Jovanović was also Slice's strength coach.

== Writing career ==
His blog on b92.net is the most visited blog in Serbia. Milan Strongman Jovanovic publishing his texts in Serbian issue of Playboy and newspaper Kurir.

== Personal life ==
Jovanović has three sons and holds a master's degree in electronics at the Faculty of Electronic Engineering University of Niš. He also appeared in several supporting roles in a couple of movies, namely The Parade, The Sisters and Montevideo, vidimo se!.

== Acting career ==
Film	Director	Year	Character
Sestre	Vladimir Paskaljevic	2011	Husein
Parada	Srdjan Dragojevic	2011	Afrika
Travelator	Dusan Milic	2014	
Jesen samuraja	Danilo Beckovic	2016	Vidoje
Vivegam	Siva	2017	self
Incoming	Eric Zaragoza	2018	Bolat
Nebesa	Srdjan Dragojevic	Post-production	

Serie	Year	Character
Folk	2013	self
Montevideo, vidimo se!	2014	
Zigosani u reketu	2019	Milance
Sol negro	2019-2020	Lale Bozadzija
