= The Wounds =

1998 Yugoslavian drama film

- Directed by: Srđan Dragojević
- Written by: Srđan Dragojević
- Produced by: Dragan Bjelogrlić; Goran Bjelogrlić; Nikola Kojo; Milko Josifov; Aleksandar Avramović
- Starring: Dušan Pekić; Milan Marić; Dragan Bjelogrlić; Vesna Trivalić; Branka Katić
- Cinematography: Dušan Joksimović
- Edited by: Petar Marković
- Music by: Aleksandar Habić
- Production companies: RTS, Cobra Films
- Release date: 15 May 1998 (Yugoslavia)
- Running time: 103 minutes
- Country: Yugoslavia
- Language: Serbian
- Budget: $800,000

The Wounds (Serbian: Ране / Rane) is a 1998 Serbian drama film written and directed by Srđan Dragojević. It depicts the violent lives of two boys in Belgrade as they aspire to make names for themselves in the city's underworld. The story takes place throughout the 1990s, against the backdrop of Yugoslav Wars and growing ethnic hatred.

The film won a Bronze Horse at the Stockholm International Film Festival and a FIPRESCI Prize at the Thessaloniki Film Festival, "For its powerful, dramatic depiction of the brutal reality and complexity of life in the Balkans today."

== Plot ==
Rane's opening sequence announces it as being "dedicated to the generations born after Tito". The film follows two boys, Pinki and Švaba, through their preadolescence and early adolescence as they're growing up in New Belgrade during the Yugoslav Wars (1991–95).

Born on 4 May 1980—the day Yugoslav president Josip Broz Tito died—baby Pinki would be named by his father Stojan Mučibabić, an idealistic, impulsive, and patriotic Yugoslav People's Army (JNA) officer deeply devoted to the Titoist brand of communism. The father's first choice for his firstborn son's name was actually Tito, but the municipal office registry administrators thought it provocative and inappropriate in the time of nationwide grieving so he quickly pulled out his backup options—including Ramiz after a communist resistance Partisan guerrilla fighter—eventually settling on Pinki after another Partisan. Meanwhile, Pinki's best friend Švaba is raised and cared for only by his grandmother, a Croatian Serb who had fled to Serbia during World War II amid genocide being perpetrated against the Serbs by the Croatian fascist movement Ustaše.

Living in a block of apartment buildings in New Belgrade's neighbourhood of Paviljoni, both kids are extremely juvenile; Pinki is a bit more thoughtful and articulate while Švaba is moody, impulsive, and prone to anger outbursts. The duo also has another friend in the neighbourhood—Dijabola, an eager, geeky, and bespectacled outsider whose sexy and aloof single mother Lidija is a well-known local television personality, hosting her own highly rated interview program while his Slovenian father is absent from his life. Though they hang out with Dijabola, Pinki and Švaba mostly consider him a third wheel and treat him poorly. He is constantly the butt of their insults and target of their roughhousing that occasionally crosses the line into physical violence.

The story begins during late summer 1991 as the kids watch Serbian troops (regular JNA troops and various volunteer militias) going off to war in the breakaway Yugoslav federal constituent unit of Croatia where the Battle of Vukovar is raging. Pinki's father Stojan is extremely frustrated about being forced into early retirement by the JNA and thus missing his chance to go to war. He spends his days glued to the television set, watching news reports from Vukovar and cheering on the JNA. By now he has transformed into a Miloševićesque Serbian nationalist; his impulsiveness nowadays mostly manifesting through petty quarrels with neighbours and verbal outbursts with ethnic and political overtones. Instead of Tito, he's become a huge supporter of Slobodan Milošević while immensely disliking Milošević's main political rival Vuk Drašković. Prepubescent Pinki, for his part, is mostly oblivious to the events around him, spending most of his time compulsively masturbating—often with neighbour Lidija in mind.

By 1992 and 1993, Serbia is under a UN trade embargo, and the war has spread from Croatia to Bosnia as well. Entering their early teens, Pinki, Švaba and Dijabola begin their fascination with a neighbour across the street nicknamed Kure who drives a nice car, makes regular robbing excursions to Germany while dating a trashy kafana singer. They're deeply impressed with his swagger and lifestyle and are ecstatic one day when he invites them to unload his car that's full of apparel and appliances he brought over from Germany. In fact, he sends Dijabola away and picks only Švaba, but then upon Švaba's suggestion tells Pinki to come along as well.

Like many of their peers, Pinki and Švaba enter the world of crime at fourteen years of age in an ex-communist community that is in hyper-transition, which, because of war and sanctions, reminds the two friends of a theater of the absurd. The idols of the main characters are famous Belgrade gangsters featured on a TV show called Puls Asfalta (Pulse of the Asphalt), which turns them into media stars. Pinki and Švaba fantasize of being on the show one day and they attempt to be noticed by its producers by committing crimes. After they succeed in establishing themselves as influential criminals and drug dealers, their uprising in the world of crime is cut by mutual conflict as both start having sex with Lidija. Švaba shoots Pinki five times in the same places that Jesus was wounded two thousand years ago. Pinki manages to survive and after some time he escapes from the hospital, and calls his friend to make peace. The truce is more than terrible, as the wounded boy has, after an unwritten rule, to inflict five identical wounds to his friend, so the friendship can be rebuilt. After shooting Švaba three times, he considers wounding him one more time instead of the required two. They are suddenly interrupted by a furious Dijabola who shoots at them, especially Švaba, for killing his mother. A shootout occurs and Švaba and Dijabola are killed. In the end, Pinki, who is wounded and is lying on the ground, laughs at the audience by claiming that he "made out better than you."

== Cast ==
- Dušan Pekić – Pinki
- Milan Marić – Švaba
- Dragan Bjelogrlić – Čika Kure
- Vesna Trivalić – Lidija
- Andreja Jovanović – Dijabola
- Branka Katić – Suzana
- Miki Manojlović – Stojan (Pinki's father)
- Gorica Popović – Nevenka (Pinki's mother)
- Nikola Kojo – Biber
- Zora Doknić – Švaba's grandmother
- Danica Maksimović – Ninana, the prostitute
- Feđa Stojanović – Žikica, the news anchor
- Bata Stojković – Neighbour
- Seka Sablić – Neighbour
- Radoslav Milenković – Police inspector
- Nikola Pejaković – Kafana owner
- Dragan Maksimović – Patient in the hospital
- Milorad Mandić – Body builder

== Production ==
=== Background ===
With the positive critical reaction to his 1996 film Lepa sela lepo gore on the festival circuit throughout North America, thirty-three-year-old director Dragojević ended up signing with the William Morris Agency whose representatives first approached him at the Montreal World Film Festival. Receiving backing from one of Hollywood's most prominent talent agencies along with having a successful film on his hands, would lead to the young director spending most of the late summer and early fall 1996 in advanced talks about continuing his career in the United States.

Simultaneously, back home in Serbia he had two film ideas in the early stages of development—epic World War I story St. George Slays the Dragon and a smaller film based on a television news report about two teenage criminals in contemporary Belgrade—both of which his Serbian producers, Cobra Film owned by the Bjelogrlić brothers (Goran and Dragan), wanted him to do before potentially leaving for the United States. In the end, after going through multiple Hollywood meetings during which he reportedly got offered scripts that he found "execrable", Dragojević decided not to move to America, choosing instead to do the smaller of the two films in Serbia.

=== Idea ===
The story is built around a real-life occurrence depicted in a 1994 episode of Tragač, television series hosted and produced by Predrag Jeremić (1962-2022) that aired on RTV Studio B, about Mirko "Beša" Bešević and Marko "Kameni" Pejković—two criminally-involved Belgrade adolescents who started out as friends before viciously turning on one another. In a fit of anger one youth shot the other five times, but the wounded youth survived and recovered. Later, attempting to 'repair' their friendship, the shooter offered his recovered friend to shoot him five times in the exact body parts in order to get even. The recovered victim accepted the offer and shot his assailant back five times before they resumed their friendship.

Dragojević was reportedly told of this by friends and decided to use it as basis for a screenplay he says he wrote in thirteen days. He furthermore claims to have purposely avoided watching the actual TV report because he didn't want to have his writing, casting, and directorial decisions subconsciously influenced by images or language in it.

After finally seeing the report upon film's completion, Dragojević said he was amazed with the visual and behavioural similarities between the two sets of teens.

=== Casting ===
Looking for first-time actors to cast in the two main roles, the production team organized mass auditions during which reportedly thousands of Belgrade youths were looked at in area high schools, with director Dragojević seeing several hundreds of them. As the number of candidates was narrowed down to ten, they were enrolled in Mika Aleksić's acting studio for specific two-month training that included going over the entire script scene-by-scene before the final duo—seventeen-year-old Pekić and sixteen-year-old Marić—were selected. Dragojević cast Dušan Pekić for the lead role of Pinki, noting that Pekić shared a similar background with the character. The film proved to be Pekić's first and only role, as he died in 2000.

The filming began in fall 1997 and had 78 shooting days.

The film's was funded in large part by the state institutions such as the state-run broadcaster RTS. Among its corporate sponsors, the movie's closing credits also list the McDonald's Corporation and Fruit of the Loom.

== Release and reaction ==
As Rane was going into theatrical release, the film's director, Srđan Dragojević, put out an accompanying statement explaining his personal motivation to revisit the subject of Yugoslav Wars, this time from the perspective of those living behind the frontlines. In it he directly accused the Milošević administration of "forcing the young people of Serbia to grow up in the country flooded by the wave of primitivism and nationalism where those who went through puberty while Vukovar and Sarajevo were being destroyed have been made the terrible victims whose wounds will never heal": "This is a story about young criminals whom I believe have a deep moral right to be violent, even to murder, despite the political unacceptability of this idea. An insensitive society and a totalitarian Serbian regime have made thousands of Serbian teenagers dangerous, senseless killing machines, ironically whose main victims are themselves".

The film was released in FR Yugoslavia (Serbia and Montenegro) in May 1998 where it became a cinema hit with 450,000 admission tickets sold despite its promotional cycle in the country being severely impacted by the government's refusal to run the film's ads on state television RTS (then under general manager Dragoljub Milanović). The authorities had been dissatisfied with the country's bleak portrayal in the film. Talking to the Serbian edition of Playboy in 2004, the movie's producer Dragan Bjelogrlić said the following:

We were under a media embargo of sorts when it came to publicity for Rane. I managed to find out from the Yugoslav Left (JUL) circles at the time that they're not mad at us for making a movie against them, but that they have a problem with the fact that we did it using their money. And in a way they have a point there because that was a calculated swindle on our part. It would be very useful for me to now be able to say that they threatened me, but that simply isn't true. I'm no martyr, here. The only thing was that they wouldn't give me access to RTS, but at that time no sane person would even think of going on RTS. Journalists asked me a lot about that, especially in Croatia and Bosnia-Herzegovina, but there's really not much to the story.

In January 2014, as guest on Veče sa Ivanom Ivanovićem, Bjelogrlić expanded on the problem Rane had with Serbian authorities back in 1998.

The 1990s in Serbia were a strange time, and I can point out many situations in support of that claim, including this absurdity that we made anti-state films using state money. Today, that wouldn't be possible, and I say that almost with nostalgia..... On the other hand, back then we lived in a country that we considered to be a dictatorship and we thought of Milošević as a big time dictator, and it's not like we had no reasons to think of him that way. However, on the festival circuit with Lepa sela and especially with Rane we'd meet foreigner after foreigner telling us in utter bemusement: 'Wait a sec, you guys got state funding to make a movie like this, wow, it must be a very free and democratic society'. And of course it wasn't really, because we employed a lot of tricks so that in many instances the individuals approving the money had the wrong impression of what the movie is going to be. Specifically with Rane, we submitted a completely fake script to the RTS. So then, at the premiere, a minor scandal occurred when some functionaries walked out and as a result our TV promotion got cut immediately. And being the film's producer, I figured it would be good to see through private channels if there would be more serious repercussions so I managed to get to a man who held high post in the police at the time. And he told me the famous line: 'We're OK with you criticizing us, but we're not OK with the fact you're doing it with our dough' and advised me to lay low until the situation blows over. So I went to France to watch the World Cup and I continued traveling around Europe for a bit. So, by the time I got back home things cooled down a bit and nothing serious took place.

Starting in April 1999, the film began a theatrical distribution in Croatia thus becoming the first Serbian film in the post-Yugoslav Wars era to have distribution in that country. Another curiosity of its release in Croatia was that it was subtitled. Even its title was translated from Rane to Ozljede, all of which became subject of much outrage and ridicule. It became a hit in the cinemas regardless, selling more than 40,000 admission tickets (~42,000) in Croatia.

Looking back on his acting career, in February 2012, Bjelogrlić brought up the role of Čika Kure as being one of the dearest to him, but also revealed a later personal realization that he "could've done a much better job portraying it".

== Critical reception ==
=== United States ===
Amy Taubin of The Village Voice finds Rane's pace to be erratic and frequently frantic, seeing its final scene as having "a relentless, demented logic of its own" while noting "there's nothing gratuitous about the violence of Dragojević's cinematic language". She further remarks that the movie's imagery is "a bit too invested in martyrdom" representing "a politicized and catholicized version of live fast, die young, leave a beautiful corpse" before she detects "a touch of Holden Caulfield in Pinki's voiceover narration", while noting "the film plays like a cross between Los Olvidados and Dead Presidents".

The New York Times' Janet Maslin brings up Emir Kusturica's Underground as having "demonstrated the anguish in the Balkans may be better conveyed through raucous, stinging satire than by more conventionally compassionate means" and notes that Dragojević employed the same tonal approach, which "helped him define a new generation of thugs who arouse both horror and pity". She concludes that the movie is "filmed with enough stylistic bravado and sardonic narration to recall Trainspotting, seeing it best appreciated as an answer to the question Švaba poses late in the movie (in response to Pinki's statement "You've got to care about something") — "What if you can't find anything?"

Keith Phipps of The A.V. Club sees Rane as being "modeled in many respects after Goodfellas" while "Dragojević's decision to let lost youth tell its own story reinforces the power of his forceful narrative and visual style, as Pinki's nihilistic musings reveal a character for whom hope has never been an option". Phipps also picks up on Dragojević's statement about Rane being a very cruel and shocking film that makes A Clockwork Orange seem like a Disney production by saying that "Dragojević's post-Tito kids live in a world that Burgess and Kubrick could only have imagined; where Clockwork carried a heavy allegorical weight, Rane has the disturbing feel of reportage".

== See also ==
- Dizelaši, Belgrade youth sub-culture
- Crime that Changed Serbia, 1995 documentary about Belgrade gangsters
