= Mi plačemo iza tamnih naočara =

Studio album by Dobri Isak
- Released: 1986
- Recorded: Markiz's room, 1985; Radio Niš, 1986
- Genres: Post-punk; darkwave
- Length: 34:59; 60:23 (reissue)
- Labels: SKC Niš; PMK Records (reissue)
- Producer: Saša Marković

Reissue cover

Professional ratings
Review scores
| Source | Rating |
|---|---|
| Barikada (CD reissue review) | 8.5/10 stars |
| Balkanrock (CD reissue review) | 4.5/5 stars |
| Mikrofonija (CD reissue review) | (favorable) |
| Terapija (CD reissue review) | 8/10 stars |
| TMM (CD reissue review) | 8.5/10 stars |

Mi plačemo iza tamnih naočara (trans. We Cry Behind Dark Glasses) is the first and only studio album by the Yugoslav post-punk/darkwave band Dobri Isak, released in 1984.

The album was originally released on compact cassette and with a limited printing of a hundred copies only, rapidly sold out and became a collector's item. In 2009 the album was re-released by PMK Records with seven bonus tracks of unreleased material, bringing to the band new attention from the audience and recognition from the music critics in Serbia and other former Yugoslav republics.

== Background ==
Formed in Niš in 1983, Dobri Isak recorded their only studio album, Mi plačemo iza tamnih naočara, in 1984. The album was released by the Niš Students' Cultural Center (SKS), being the first release of the Center's Studentkult production, which issued an array of musical and literary releases. The album, released on compact cassette only and printed in a limited number of 100 copies, had been distributed by the Ljubljana Students' Cultural Center, and rapidly sold out, but owing to copying managed to reach underground music audience in all parts of Yugoslavia. The group disbanded in 1986, their album gaining a cult status during the following decades.

== 2009 reissue and later reissues ==
In 2009 the album was re-released by PMK Records with seven bonus tracks of unreleased material, bringing to the band new attention from the audience and recognition from music critics in Serbia and other former Yugoslav republics.

In June 2010, PMK Records released the 150 copies limited edition reissue of the album, featuring an alternate album cover, with the band's logo written in red, and a black CD. In 2015 the album was released on vinyl record for the first time by the same record label. During the same year, the label issued the 100 copies limited vinyl edition of the album on transparent red vinyl, co-releasing it with Swedish record label Ne! Records. In 2021, the album was once again reissued on vinyl by PMK Records, Šareni dućan and Blind Dog Records.

== Album cover ==
The original album cover features an image of comic book superhero The Phantom. The original audio cassette foldout J-card also featured images of comic book heroes Spider-Man and Mandrake the Magician.

== Track listing ==
All tracks written by Dobri Isak except "Feniks", written by the band Arnold Layne (N. Cvetičanin, D. Krstović, D. Marinković, M. Manić)

Ulična strana A (Street Side A)
| No. | Title | Length |
|---|---|---|
| 1. | "Ona se igra nožem" ("She Plays with a Knife") | 2:12 |
| 2. | "Sinoć si sanjao da si pas" ("Last Night You Dreamed You Were a Dog") | 3:02 |
| 3. | "Mi plačemo iza tamnih naočara" ("We Cry behind Dark Glasses") | 4:54 |
| 4. | "Čekamo te (na istom mestu)" ("We Await for You (at the Same Place)") | 2:53 |
| 5. | "Ja znam da ću propasti" ("I Know I Will Perish") | 4:49 |

Sobna strana A (Room Side A)
| No. | Title | Length |
|---|---|---|
| 1. | "Feniks" ("Phoenix") | 3:30 |
| 2. | "Plakati su ikone" ("Posters Are Icons") | 3:05 |
| 3. | "Dozvoli mi da ostanem u tvom krevetu" ("Let Me Stay in Your Bed") | 2:59 |
| 4. | "Mrzim te" ("I Hate You") | 3:45 |
| 5. | "Tu u uglu (tada sam te poslednji put video)" ("There in the Corner (That Is when I Last Saw You)") | 3:50 |

=== CD reissue bonus tracks ===
| No. | Title | Length |
|---|---|---|
| 11. | "Mi plačemo iza tamnih naočara (verzija iz Markizove sobe)" ("We Cry behind Dark Glasses (Version from Markiz's Room)") | 4:36 |
| 12. | "Ona se igra nožem (verzija iz Markizove sobe)" ("She Plays with a Knife (Version from Markiz's Room)") | 2:14 |
| 13. | "Kad nisi mlad (verzija iz Radio Niša)" ("When You Are Not Young (Version from Radio Niš)") | 2:47 |
| 14. | "Helen Keller" ("Helen Keller") | 2:43 |
| 15. | "I Isus nosi vunene rukavice" ("Jesus Wears Wool Gloves, Too") | 2:54 |
| 16. | "Čudna kuća" ("The Strange House") | 6:36 |
| 17. | "Filmovi" ("Movies") | 3:23 |

== Credits ==
=== Dobri Isak ===
- Predrag Cvetičanin "Frodo" - guitar, vocals
- Miloš Miladinović "Pacov" - bass guitar, backing vocals
- Saša Marković "Markiz" - drums, backing vocals
- Saša Marković "Stipsa" - album producer

=== Additional personnel ===
- Nenad Cvetičanin (guitar, backing vocals on the recordings made at Markiz's room)
- Dejan Krasić (guitar on the recordings made at Radio Niš)

== Cover versions ==
- In 1994, on the album Land Ho!, Nenad Cvetičanin's band Arnold Layne & Alhemija, covered the song "Mi plačemo iza tamnih naočara".
- In 2010, Croatian rock band Mlijeko released a cover of "Mi plačemo iza tamnih naočara" on their self-titled debut album.
