= Dizelaši =

1990s Serbian subculture

Dizelaši (Serbian Cyrillic: дизелаши; singular dizelaš, Serbian Cyrillic: дизелаш) was an urban street youth sub-culture popular in the 1990s in Serbia. It has been described as a mainstream fashion and social subculture, that of a working class, similar to the British chav, French racaille and Russian gopnik. The French movie La Haine (1995) is often mentioned in relation to these subcultures. It was characterized by turbo-folk, hip-hop and dance music (such as Đogani), mass-appeal designer clothes (such as Diesel), embroidered sweatshirts and sportswear (such as Nike Air Max and Reebok Pump shoes and Kappa sweatsuits) and large link chains. Track jackets were tucked into the bottom pants which in turn were tucked into socks, as to conceal goods; it is said that legendary gangster Knele (1971–1992) popularised it, having used it as a tactic ensuring his gun would slide into his socks rather on the pavement when running from the police.

It emerged in Belgrade in the late 1980s and became popular by 1992, in a period of embargo on FR Yugoslavia following the outbreak of the Yugoslav Wars. The youths were stereotyped as gangsters (also called mangupi), involved in illegal activities such as fuel smuggling. The dizelaši were widely seen as a sign of social decay. One Belgrade journalist wrote about the dizelaši: "The guys who belong to this, let's say "movement", wear streetwear from the clothing Diesel and Nike, usually track pants and-very important-they always tuck their shirt into their pants. They are bald and they look like bodybuilders. And it is very popular to run around packing heat [carry a gun]...The women fulfill the other half of the heterosexual code: sexiness, short skirts, bare midriff". The 1980s and early 1990s had been a period of economic decline in Yugoslavia, and the young people who became involved in the dizelaši movement tended to be working class people who were unable to find jobs. The inability to find legal employment led to a prevalent mood of cynicism and pessimism amongst many young people who embraced the dizelaši style with the emphasis on machismo and violence being especially appealing to angry, cynical working class young men.

The Russian counterpart is the Gopnik sub-culture, with which it is grouped together into "Post-Soviet fashion" that has become popular in recent years. In contrast to the dizelaši, the opposing sub-culture was called padavičari ("spazzes" - "padavica" is the Serbian name for epilepsy), including hippies, rockers, headbangers, metalheads and ravers. A typical dizelaš was seen as:

A youngster, short-cut [hair], in a track suit, with a gold chain around his neck, a mobile phone (possibly a good car), often tied to criminal activities.

The resurge of the fashion has been dubbed Neodizelaši. The 1995 documentary about Belgrade gangsters, Crime that Changed Serbia, is an icon of the culture.

Modern-day subculture closely related to old dizelaši is called gaseri (Serbo-Croatian) / gaserji (Slovene).

== In movies ==
- Dva sata kvalitetnog TV programa, 1994 film
- Crime that Changed Serbia, 1995 documentary about Belgrade criminals
- The Wounds, 1998 film about a violent teen duo in Belgrade
- Skinning, 2010 film
- Welcome to Dizeldorf, meaning Welcome to Düsseldorf, Mashan Lekitch - Mašan Lekić 1994 documentary about Belgrade nineties culture

== See also ==
- Chav, sub-culture in UK
- Gopnik, sub-culture in Russia
- Šatrovački, sociolect

== Sources ==
- Calic, Marie-Janine (2019). A History of Yugoslavia. West Lafayette: Purdue University Press. ISBN 9781612495644.
- Eric D. Gordy (1 November 2010). Culture of Power in Serbia: Nationalism and the Destruction of Alternatives. Penn State Press. pp. 133–. ISBN 978-0-271-04368-5.
- Ivana Kronja. "Urbani životni stilovi..." Komunikacija. Archived from the original on 2012-06-18.
- Rečnik savremenog beogradskog žargona: preko 4500 žargonskih reči i izraza. Istar. 2002. ISBN 9788690231164.
- Milosz Miszczynski and Adriana Helbig, ed. (27 March 2017). Hip Hop at Europe's Edge: Music, Agency, and Social Change. Indiana University Press. pp. 95–. ISBN 978-0-253-02321-6.
- Papović J., Pejović A. (2016) Revival without Nostalgia: The ‘Dizel’ Movement, Serbian 1990s Cultural Trauma and Globalised Youth Cultures. In: Schwartz M., Winkel H. (eds) Eastern European Youth Cultures in a Global Context. Palgrave Macmillan, London
