= Wait for Me and I Will Not Come =

2009 film

- Directed by: Miroslav Momčilović
- Starring: Miloš Samolov; Mirjana Karanović; Gordan Kičić
- Release date: 13 June 2009
- Running time: 90 minutes
- Country: Serbia
- Language: Serbian

Wait for Me and I Will Not Come (Serbian: Čekaj me, ja sigurno neću doći) is a 2009 Serbian drama film directed by Miroslav Momčilović.

== Cast ==
- Miloš Samolov - Bane
- Mirjana Karanović - Andja
- Gordan Kičić - Alek
- Milica Mihajlović - Teodora
- Branislav Trifunović - Nemanja
- Vanja Ejdus - Marina
- Petar Božović - Milenko
- Jelena Đokić - Dejana
- Danica Maksimović - Razredna
- Ljubomir Bandović - Todor
