= List of compositions by Akil Mark Koci =

This is a list of compositions by the Kosovar Albanian composer Akil Mark Koci.

== Choral works ==
- Lirisë, To Freedom, 1959. First performance: April 1960, Sarajevo.
- Maca e vogël, Little Cat, 1959. First performance: March 1967, Children's Choir Radio Pristina.
- Vajzës, To the Girl, 1960. First performance: June 1968, Kruševac Festival Choir.
- Nënës time, 1960. First performance: February 1988, Choir of Radio Pristina.
- Pa titull, Untitled, 1971. First performance: November 1972, Choir Radio Zagreb, Opatija.
- O, e ëmbëla, 1971. First performance: June 1986, Choir of Radio Pristina.
- Kaltërsirat, 1972. First performance: October 1986, Choir of Radio Pristina.
- Iz zapisa Stevana Mokranjac, From the manuscripts of Stevan Stojanović Mokranjac, 1973. First performance: November 1977, Choir of Radio Belgrade, Opatija.

== Voice & Piano ==
- Popullit tim, To my People, 1971. First performance: November 1977. Music Scene, Pristina.
- Elegji, Elegjy, 1971. First performance: November 1973. Radio Ljubljana, Slovenia.
- Rekviem, Requiem, 1971. First performance: September 1974. Radio Ljubljana, Slovenia.
- Nimfa, 1971. First performance: Music Scene, Pristina.
- Rekviem, Requiem, 1971. First performance: September 1974. Radio Ljubljana, Slovenia.
- Trimja Gjakovare, 1974. First performance: 1986. Music Scene, Pristina.

== Symphonies, Suites & Concertos ==
- Attimo, for string orchestra. First performance: 1973.
- Multiple Sinocricies, for symphonic orchestra. First performance: 1974.
- Silueta, for oboe and strings. First performance: Novi Sad 1975.
- Sirigmofonia, for symphonic orchestra. First performance: Zagreb 1975.
- Simfoni libertas for symphonic orchestra. 1975.
- Ab Aeterno, for symphonic orchestra. First performance: Music Scene 1976, Pristina.
- Pentalfa, for symphonic ensemble. First performance: Opatija 1976.
- Dialogue, for double bass and orchestra. First performance: Pristina 1977.
- Marginalët I, for symphonic orchestra. First performance: Opatija 1977.
- Marginalët II, for symphonic orchestra. First performance: Music Scene 1978, Pristina.
- Koncert për viol dhe orkestër, concerto for viola and orchestra. First performance: 1978, Days of Kosovar Music.
- Quasi Concerto, for orchestra, 1978.
- Koncert për violinë dhe orkestër. First performance: 1987.
- Koncert për flautë dhe harqe, concerto for flute and strings. 1988.
- Symphonic Movement, for orchestra. 1989.
- Transformime, for strings. 1990.
- Capriccio, for strings. 1990.
- Concerto for piano and orchestra. 1990.
- Scherzo, for orchestra. 1991.
- Salvatio, for orchestra. 1991.
- Dassacaglia, for strings. 1991.
- Sinfonieta, for orchestra. 1992.
- Scherzo, for solo violin. 1992.
- Concerto for oboe and strings. 1992.
- Dance from Albania, for orchestra and strings. 1992.
- Reflections, for clarinet and orchestra. 1993.
- Hosana, for choir. 1993.
- Adieu dhe lamento, for solo soprano and piano. 1994.
- Christus Factus, for choir. 1996.
- Sonatinagiocosa, for solo violin. 1996.
- Koncert për violinë dhe orkestër alla Paganini, for Yehudi Menuhin. 1996.
- Passacaglia, for violin and strings. 1996.
