= Sinđelići =

Serbian television series

- Promotional poster
- Синђелићи
- Created by: Emotion movies
- Starring: Voja Brajović; Vanesa Radman; Snežana Bogdanović; Branka Pujić; Boris Komnenić; Milena Dravić; Goran Radaković; Branko Cvejić; Milica Mihajlović; Vučić Perović; Brankica Sebastijanović; Svetlana Bojković
- Opening theme: Jedan i jedan su sedam (One and one are seven)
- Country of origin: Serbia
- Original language: Serbian
- No. of seasons: 6
- No. of episodes: 229

Production
- Production locations: Belgrade, Serbia
- Running time: 45 min.

Original release
- Network: Prva Srpska Televizija
- Release: October 14, 2013 – July 12, 2019

Sinđelići (Serbian Cyrillic: Синђелићи) is a Serbian television drama comedy which started on October 14, 2013. Sinđelići is an adaption of Los Serrano.

== Plot ==
Lila and Sreten getting married and begin to live with their children from their first marriage. Lila has two daughters, and Sreten has three sons. But things do not go as they planned. Family Sinđelić make Sreten, his brothers Jezdimir "Jezda" and Momčilo (season 2) and Sreten's sons Metodije, Gojko and Kolja. After his first wife's death, Sreten married Lila, his girlfriend from adulthood. Lila has daughters Eva and Tereza, mother Ksenija and aunt Lidija (season 2). Sreten's best friend is Fedor "Feki" Ristić, and Lila's best friend is Nikolina "Niki" Ristić, Fedor's wife.

== Cast ==
Actor	Character
Voja Brajović	Sreten Sinđelić
Vanessa Radman (S1 E1); Snežana Bogdanović (S1 E2-S3); Branka Pujić (S4-)	Dobrila Sinđelić
Boris Komnenić	Jezdimir "Jezda" Sinđelić
Milena Dravić	Ksenija
Goran Radaković	Fedor "Feki" Ristić
Branko Cvejić	Momčilo Sinđelić
Milica Mihajlović	Nikolina Ristić
Vučić Perović	Metodije "Metod" Sinđelić
Brankica Sebastijanović	Eva Stoimenov
Miloš Klanšček	Gojko Sinđelić
Jelena Kosara	Tereza Stoimenov
Nemanja Pavlović	Kolja Sinđelić
Svetlana Bojković	Lidija
