= Mamaroš =

2013 film

- Directed by: Momčilo Mrdaković
- Written by: Momčilo Mrdaković
- Starring: Sergej Trifunović
- Cinematography: János Vecsernyés
- Release dates: 22 June 2013 (Moscow); 2 July 2013 (Serbia)
- Running time: 105 minutes
- Country: Serbia
- Language: Serbian

Mamaroš is a 2013 Serbian comedy film written and directed by Momčilo Mrdaković. It competed in the main competition section of the 35th Moscow International Film Festival.

== Cast ==
- Sergej Trifunović as Policajac
- Erin O'Brien as Concession Girl
- Bogdan Diklić as Pera Ilic
- Mira Banjac as Mara
- Milos Samolov as Mika
- Milan Marić as Decak vojnik
- Vlasta Velisavljevic as Penzioner / Tajni agent
- Goran Radaković as Staklorezac Sima
- Anita Mančić as Lela
- Adam Kern as Immigration Officer
