= Radovan Lale Djuric =

Serbian-American artist

- Born: May 7, 1945; Niš, Serbia
- Died: April 2014 (aged 68); New York City, USA
- Education: University of Niš
- Occupation: artist
- Organization: Nis Art Foundation
- Spouse: Marlene Baragano
- Children: 1

Radovan Lale Djuric (May 1945 – April 2014) was a Serbian-American artist and the founder of the Nis Art Foundation.

== Early life and education ==
Radovan Lale Djuric, who went by "Lale", was born on May 7, 1945 in Niš, Yugoslavia (now Serbia).

He studied at the College of Architecture at the University of Niš in Niš.

== Career ==
After his studies in Niš, Djuric worked at the National Theatre in Belgrade, Serbia as a set designer before studying fine art in Belgrade, Venice, Amsterdam, and Paris. Djuric went on to work with the Dalmas design firm in Paris before moving to the United States for the remainder of his career.

After moving to the United States in the 1970s, he set up his own gallery space called "Lale's Space" on East 72nd street in Manhattan, New York. Djuric displayed his own artwork, including his large folding panels.

== Personal life and death ==
Djuric and his wife Marlene had one child, a son named William.

Djuric died in April 2014 at the age of 68, and was laid to rest in his native Serbia.
