= Telo i duša =

Compilation album by Trivalia
- Released: 1990
- Recorded: 1987–1990
- Genre: Gothic rock
- Length: 39:45
- Language: serbian, english, latin
- Label: self-release

Telo i duša (trans. Body and Soul) is an album by the Serbian gothic rock band Trivalia. It was released in 1990.

== Track listing ==
=== Side A ===
No.	Title	Length
1.	"I Always..."	4:37
2.	"Ruža i krst" (The Rose and the Cross)	3:24
3.	"To smo mi" (That's Us)	3:51
4.	"Praviteljstvujušči sovjet serbski" (The Ruling Council of Serbia)	6:10
5.	"The Kill"	1:32

=== Side B ===
No.	Title	Length
1.	"U sobi" (In the Room)	3:48
2.	"Show Me"	5:14
3.	"Iza vrata" (Behind the Door)	3:18
4.	"Strah" (Fear)	3:36
5.	"Dress Me in Black"	4:11
