= Kënga e Rexhës =

Kënga e Rexhës (Rexha's Song) is a ballet by the composer Akil Mark Koci based on the Albanian folk song "Kënga e Rexhës", also known as "Çohu Rexho". It is presented in two acts. It was originally choreographed by Franjo Horvat in 1982. The scenographer for the 1982 version was Jelna Uhlik-Horvat.
