= Dobri Isak =

Former Yugoslav post-punk/darkwave band

Background information
- Origin: Niš, SR Serbia, SFR Yugoslavia
- Genres: New wave; post-punk; darkwave; gothic rock
- Years active: 1983–1986
- Labels: SKC Niš, PMK Records
- Past members: Predrag Cvetičanin; Zoran Đorđević; Miloš Miladinović; Saša Marković; Nenad Cvetičanin

Dobri Isak (Serbian Cyrillic: Добри Исак; trans. Kind Isaac) was a Yugoslav post-punk/darkwave band formed in Niš in 1983.

Dobri Isak existed for only a couple years, releasing only one studio album, Mi plačemo iza tamnih naočara (1984), before disbanding in 1986. During the following decades, the band's only album continued to enjoy a cult status, and after it was reissued in 2009, received new attention from audiences and recognition from music critics in Serbia and other former Yugoslav republics.

== History ==
=== 1983–1986 ===
The name Dobri Isak was created even before the group was formed, at the time when I was reading in parallel Fear and Trembling and Burgess' A Clockwork Orange, which in a strange way got connected in my conscience. In Fear and Trembling, describing his own anguish, Kierkegaard creates variations on the Biblical story of Abraham and Isaac. But in every variation, Abraham is active, he follows God's order in different ways, and Isaac is just an object, a sacrifice to be offered. And in A Clockwork Orange, there is a moment in which Alex, after therapies he was subjected to, becomes physiologically incapable of doing evil, the moment in which you become horrified knowing what will happen to him upon his return to the world you are familiar with. And then I started thinking about people who are–without that sort of therapy–naturally incapable of doing evil. And I started to call those people, just for myself, Kind Isaac. And I knew that Kierkegaard was Kind Isaac, that Kafka was Kind Isaac, that Van Gogh was Kind Isaac, that Ian Curtis was Kind Isaac.

— Predrag Cvetičanin in 2016

Original Mi plačemo iza tamnih naočara compact cassette foldout J-card

Dobri Isak was formed in Niš in late 1983 by Predrag Cvetičanin (guitar, vocals), Zoran Đorđević (guitar), and two members remembered only by their first names, Branko (bass guitar) and Boban (drums). Cvetičanin had previously been a member of the high school band Partizanska Eskadrila (Partisan Escadrille, named after the 1979 film by Hajrudin Krvavac), which performed covers of songs by Yugoslav new wave bands like Azra, Šarlo Akrobata and Električni Orgazam. Alongside the groups Fleke (Spots) and Arnold Layne i Alhemia (Arnold Lane and Alchemy), Dobri Isak was the most prominent act of Niš's new wave scene, which was part of the vibrant Yugoslav new wave scene. Having performed at minor local venues, Dobri Isak recorded a home-made demo, however, the lineup dissolved during the summer of the following year. After several months, Cvetičanin reformed the band with his former bandmates from Partizanska Eskadrila, bass guitarist Miloš Miladinović and drummer Saša Marković "Markiz". Soon after, Nenad Cvetičanin, Predrag's brother, also became a member of the band. He joined the band while his own, Arnold Layne i Alhemia, was on hiatus due to part of the members serving their mandatory stints in the Yugoslav army.

The band recorded their first and only studio album Mi plačemo iza tamnih naočara (We Cry Behind Dark Glasses), released in 1984 by the Niš Students' Cultural Center (SKC), being the first release of the Center's Studentkult production, which issued an array of musical and literary releases. Part of guitar sections on the recording were played by Dejan Krasić, also a member of Arnold Layne i Alhemia. The album was released on compact cassette only and printed in a limited number of 100 copies. It had been distributed by the Ljubljana Students' Cultural Center, and rapidly sold out, but owing to copying managed to reach underground music audience in all parts of Yugoslavia.

Following the album release, the band performed at the 1985 Serbian Youth Festival in Knjaževac, winning the Best Performance Award, and gaining the opportunity to appear at the Dani Novih Omladinskih Novina (Days of New Youth Magazine) in Split during the summer of the same year. After the Split performance, the band performed with several other Niš bands at the Pozdrav iz Niša (Greetings from Niš) festival in Skopje. In a short time period, the band had another performance in Skopje, appearing as guests at the first solo concert of the band Padot na Vizantija.

During late 1985, the band performed at the Rock Bands Festival held at the Belgrade Youth Center, and in early 1986 they had two appearances at the Zagreb alternative rock festival YU Rock Moment, during March in the semi-final, and in May at the festival finale, held at Zagreb's Republic Square, performing with Let 3, Oktobar 1864 and Mizar, among other acts. During 1986, Predrag Cvetičanin produced the recordings for the Niš synthpop band Romantične Boje (Romantic Colours), singing part of the lead vocals on the track "San" ("A Dream"), but the recordings were never released due to the unsuccessful negotiations with PGP-RTB record label; the material would be officially released for the first time in 2016 by California record label Doomed to Extinction.

Dobri Isak performed until 24 May 1986, when they held their last concert, performing with Arnold Layne i Alhemia and Mizar at Niš Synagogue, after which they decided to split up.

=== Post-breakup ===
Following the band's disbandment, Predrag Cvetičan started the publishing house Dom (Home). For a period of time, he published his fanzine Glas prola (Prole's Voice). In 1988, he published the book Svetla u podrumu duše (Lights in Soul's Basement), featuring his translations of Joy Division lyrics. Eventually, he gained a PhD in sociology, becoming a professor at University of Niš Faculty of Arts, where he still teaches. He wrote a number of books on sociology.

During the 1990s and the 2000s, Dobri Isak's only continued to enjoy a cult status. In December 2009, the indie record label PMK Records re-released Mi plačemo iza tamnih naočara with seven additional bonus tracks consisting of previously unreleased material. The album reissue brought the new attention of the audience and recognition from music critics in Serbia and other former Yugoslav republics.

In June 2010, PMK Records released the 150 copies limited edition reissue of the album, featuring an alternate album cover and a black CD. In 2015 the album was released on vinyl record for the first time by the same record label. During the same year, the label issued the 100 copies limited vinyl edition of the album on transparent red vinyl, co-releasing it with Swedish record label Ne! Records. In 2021, the album was once again reissued on vinyl by PMK Records, Šareni dućan and Blind Dog Records.

== Legacy ==
In 2016, PMK Records released the tribute album I mi plačemo iza tamnih naočara (We Too Cry Behind Dark Glasses), featuring covers of Dobri Isak songs by the bands Asphalt Chant, Iv/an, Figurative Theatre, Cyborgs on Crack, Pod, Novembar, Language.Sex.Violence, Paydo Komma, Baden-Baden, Katabazija, Plazma Maschina, Šlagvort Na Kraju, Psihokratija, Plastic Sunday, Horkestar and t.O.F. Croatian rock band Mlijeko released a cover of "Mi plačemo iza tamnih naočara" in 2010.

The 2012 documentary about Niš rock scene directed by Marijan Cvetanović and Velimir Stojanović was entitled Mi plačemo iza tamnih naočara.

== Discography ==
=== Studio albums ===
- Mi plačemo iza tamnih naočara (1984)
