= Akil Koci Prize =

The Akil Koci Prize is the highest prize given annually at the International Competition of Classical Music Pristina for outstanding performances of pieces by Albanian composers.

The prize is given to two candidates in the form of a yearly scholarship.

It is named in honor of the Kosovar composer, Akil Mark Koci and presented by him every April at the Red Hall, Pristina.

The 2005 recipient of the prize was 12-year-old Albanian pianist, Arti Marika.

The 2008 recipient of the prize was Turkish pianist, Furkan Ozyazici.

== Sources ==
- Turkish Cultural Foundation. Online https://web.archive.org/web/20110718192447/http://www.turkishculture.org/person_detail.php?ID=1699
- European Union of Music Competitions for Youth. Online Accessed 27 May, 2007.
- International Chamber Music Festival Prishtina. Online https://web.archive.org/web/20071008054756/http://www.arskosova.net/ Accessed 27 May, 2007.
- Istanbul University Archive. Online http://www.istanbul.edu.tr/duyurular/duyuru_icerik.php?1403= Accessed 29 October 2008.
