= Milica Mihajlović =

Serbian actress

- Born: 4 June 1972 (age 54); Belgrade, SFR Yugoslavia
- Occupation: actress
- Years active: 1989–present

Milica Mihajlović (Serbian Cyrillic: Милица Михајловић; born 4 June 1972) is Serbian actress.

She is daughter of Serbian writer Dragoslav Mihailović, and her husband is actor Vojislav Brajović.

== Selected filmography ==
=== Film ===
Year	Title	Role
2002	Frozen Stiff	Junkie
2009	Wait for Me and I Will Not Come	Teodora
2010	White White World	Dara
2012	Death of a Man in the Balkans	Doctor

=== Television ===
Year	Title	Role
1993	Say Why Have You Left Me	Vera
1994–1995; 2013–2014	Otvorena vrata	Anka Crnotravka
2015–2018	Neighbours	Milica Zdravković
2013–2019	Sinđelići	Nikolina Ristić
2020–present	Mama i tata se igraju rata	Milena
