= Miloš Samolov =

Serbian actor

- Милош Самолов
- Born: 31 March 1974 (age 52); Belgrade, SR Serbia, SFR Yugoslavia
- Education: Faculty of Dramatic Arts
- Alma mater: University of Arts in Belgrade
- Occupation: Actor
- Years active: 2002–present
- Height: 1.81 m (5 ft 11 in)

Miloš Samolov (Serbian Cyrillic: Милош Самолов; born 31 March 1974) is a Serbian actor. He made his acting debut in the 2002 film Mala noćna muzika in 2002, and has since garnered notable lead and supporting roles in Serbian film, television and theatre. His notable film credits include lead roles in S.O.S. - Save Our Souls (2007), Wait for Me and I Will Not Come (2009), The Belgrade Phantom (2009), The Parade (2011) and Death of a Man in the Balkans (2012). He has received widespread critical acclaim and popularity for his role as Sima in the Serbian television show Komšije. For his work in theatre, he received two Zoran Radmilović Awards, an Emperor Constantine Award and a Serbian Oscar of Popularity.

== Selected filmography ==
Year	Title	Role	Notes
2009	Wait for Me and I Will Not Come	Bane	
2009	The Belgrade Phantom	Cvele	
2011	The Parade	Radmilo	
2012	Death of a Man in the Balkans		
