= Anita Mančić =

Serbian actress

- Анита Манчић
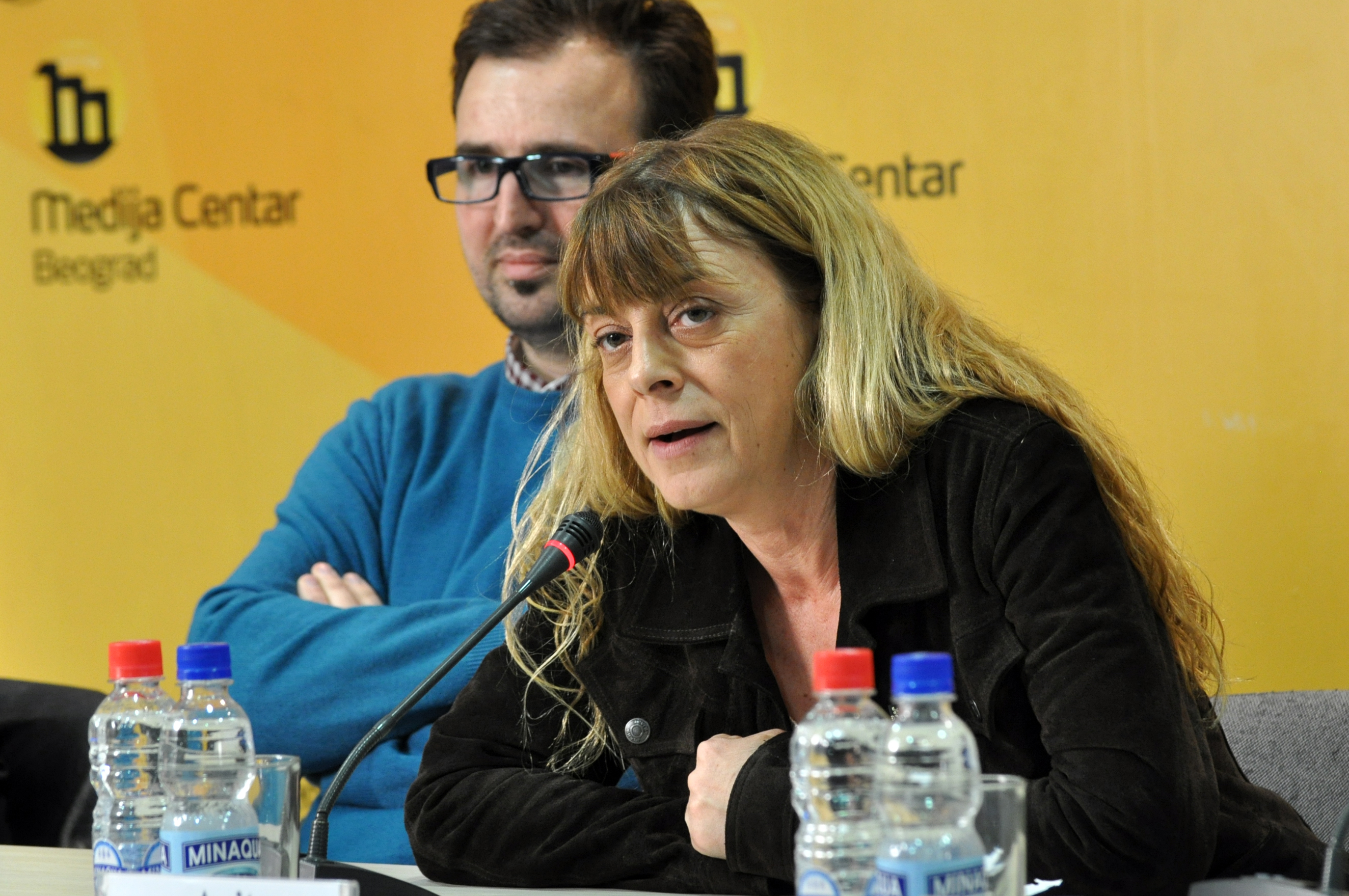
- Mančić in May 2014
- Born: 30 September 1968 (age 58); Zemun, SR Serbia, SFR Yugoslavia
- Education: Faculty of Dramatic Arts; University of Arts in Belgrade
- Occupation: Actress
- Years active: 1987–present

Anita Mančić (Serbian Cyrillic: Анита Манчић; born 30 September 1968) is a Serbian actress. She appeared in more than forty films since 1990.

== Selected filmography ==
Film
Year	Title	Role	Notes
2013	Mamaroš		
2012	Death of a Man in the Balkans		
2011	The Parade		
2010	Montevideo, God Bless You!		
2008	Love and Other Crimes		

Bulevar revolucije

TV
Year	Title	Role	Notes
2002	Novogodišnje venčanje		
2018	Jutro će promeniti sve	Biljana	
