= Dušan Pekić =

Serbian actor (1980–2000)

Dusan Pekić (Serbian Cyrilic Душан Пекић, 2 May 1980 — 26 March 2000) was a Serbian actor. His only role was in the film The Wounds, in which he portrayed Pinki, a boy who grows up in Belgrade during wars and sanctions. He planned to enter the Faculty of Dramatic Arts in Belgrade, after the end of his military service.

He got the role of Pinki because the Kobra Film company noticed him in Zemun and invited him to an audition.

He died on March 26, 2000, in Kraljevo during his military service, he died due to suffocation, due to regurgitation. He was buried at the New Bezanija cemetery.

The musician Lestra recorded a song in honor of Pinki, called "Pinki's Story".
