= University of Niš Faculty of Science and Mathematics =

Division of a Serbian university

- Природно-математички факултет у Нишу
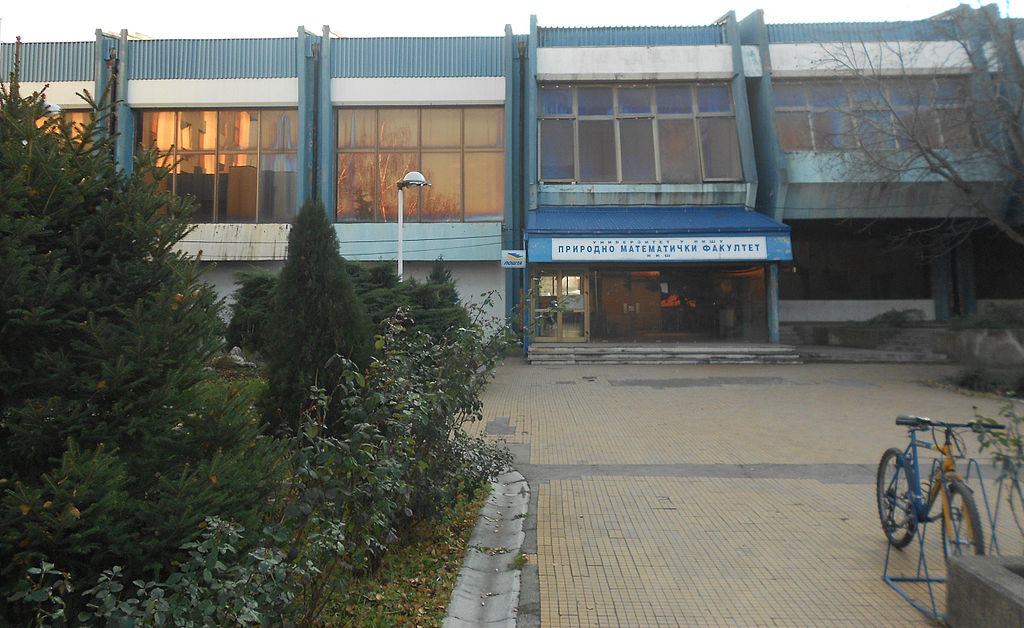
- Type: Public
- Established: 20 September 1999; 26 years ago
- Dean: Perica J. Vasiljević
- Academic staff: 212 (2018–19)
- Students: 1,567 (2018–19)
- Undergraduates: 981 (2018–19)
- Postgraduates: 428 (2018–19)
- Doctoral students: 158 (2018–19)
- Location: Niš, Serbia; 43°18′34.3″N 21°55′23″E
- Campus: Urban
- Website: www.pmf.ni.ac.rs

The University of Niš Faculty of Science and Mathematics (Serbian: Природно-математички факултет Универзитета у Нишу, romanized: Prirodno-matematički fakultet Univerziteta u Nišu), also known as the Niš Faculty of Science and Mathematics, is one of the educational institutions of the University of Niš, Serbia.

== History ==
Today's Faculty of Sciences and Mathematics, as an institution of the University of Niš, began its life within the Faculty of Philosophy in Niš. Established in 1971, the Faculty of Philosophy initially comprised several departments, three of which were Department of Mathematics, Department of Physics, and Department of Chemistry. It is these three departments that constituted the core which would later expand into Niš University's Faculty of Sciences and Mathematics. The Faculty was officially founded by Decision of the Government of the Republic of Serbia on 20 September 1999. By the same Decision it was determined that the Faculty would have five departments: Department of Mathematics, Department of Physics, Department of Chemistry, Department of Geography, and Department of Biology with Ecology.

At present, the Faculty of Sciences and Mathematics employs over 200 teaching and research staff. Since its establishment, more than 4,000 students have earned a bachelor's degree, and over 150 students have acquired a doctoral degree in the field of natural sciences and mathematics.

== Organizational structure ==
All educational and research activities at the Faculty are realized through its departments and laboratories, Center for Advanced Study in Natural and Mathematical Sciences, and IT Center. At present, the Faculty consists of six departments: Department of Mathematics, Department of Computer Science, Department of Physics, Department of Chemistry, Department of Biology and Ecology, and Department of Geography.

Research activities are realized in the laboratories, computer classrooms, and Center for Advanced Study in Natural and Mathematical Sciences. The Center itself comprises eight divisions: Division of Mathematics, Division of Computer Science, Division of Theoretical Physics, Division of Experimental and Applied Physics, Division of Chemistry, Division of Biology and Ecology, Division of Geography, and Division of Environmental Protection. The Office of the SEENET-MTP Network and the Botanical Garden are also part of the Centre.

== Educational activity ==
The Faculty educates future teachers of mathematics, computer science, physics, chemistry, biology, and geography for work in primary and secondary schools; research scientists for work at universities, research institutes and other scientific institutions; professionals for work in the government institutions, public sector enterprises, insurance agencies, banks and other financial organizations, ICT companies, travel agencies, tourism organizations, etc.

The Faculty of Sciences and Mathematics offers 20 accredited academic programs at all levels of university education.

The first level academic studies (undergraduate studies of three years in duration) are organized through the study programs in mathematics, computer science, physics, chemistry, biology, and geography.

The second level academic studies (master studies of two years in duration) are organized through the following academic programs:

- Mathematics (modules: General Mathematics, Mathematical Models in Physics, Probability, Statistics, and Financial Mathematics),
- Computer Science (modules: Software Development, Information Management),
- Physics (modules: General Physics, Applied Physics, Physics and Informatics),
- Chemistry (modules: Research and Development, Teacher of Chemistry),
- Applied Chemistry (modules: Applied Chemistry, Environmental Chemistry),
- Biology,
- Ecology and Nature Conservation,
- Geography, and
- Tourism

At the third level academic studies, the Faculty offers five academic programs which lead to the following academic titles:

- PhD in Mathematical Sciences,
- PhD in Computer Science,
- PhD in Physical Sciences,
- PhD in Chemical Sciences, and
- PhD in Biological Sciences,
- PhD School of Mathematics

== Scientific research ==
Improvement and continuous modernization of the existing study programs are governed by the scientific development and new demands placed before the job profiles that students are trained for at the Faculty. The academic staff pursues research, is engaged in various projects, and cooperates with the industry; they organize seminars and workshops for the academic staff with experts from abroad or from industry as lecturers. The Faculty of Sciences and Mathematics makes it possible for research methods and research findings to be integrated into the academic programs of doctoral studies.

The Faculty is currently involved in a total of 46 national and international projects that span across fundamental research, technological development, integrated study, and interdisciplinary research. Over 80% academic staff participate in the realization of the national research projects.

The Faculty is also involved in a number of TEMPUS and FP projects.

The academic stuff at the Faculty takes part in scientific conferences and professional symposia in the country and abroad. The Faculty itself has organized a number of significant scientific meetings.

== International cooperation ==
The Faculty is active in cooperation with universities, institutes and other faculties in the country and abroad. The following are some of the international partners that the Faculty has established cooperation with in several areas:

- International Centre for Theoretical Physics (ICTP) Trieste, Italy,
- Institutes MAX PLANCK Munich, UNESCO Paris and UNESCO-BRESCE Venice as partners in Southeastern European Network in Mathematical and Theoretical Physics (SEENET-MTP),
- Faculty of Natural Sciences and Mathematics, St. Cyril and Methodius University, Skopje, Macedonia,
- Bulgarian Academy of Sciences, Sofia, Bulgaria,
- Centro de edafologia y biologia aplicada del segura (CEBAS-CSIC), Campus Universitario de Espinardo, Murcia, Spain,
- National Institute for Agricultural Research (INRA-SPO), Montpellier, France,
- School of Pharmacy and Pharmaceutical Sciences, Trinity College Dublin, College Green, Dublin, Ireland,
- Department of Chemistry, Norwegian University of Science and Technology (NTNU), Trondheim, Norway,
- Faculty of Pharmaceutical Sciences, Tokushima Bunri University, Tokushima, Japan,
- University "Marie et Pierre Curie", Paris, France, and
- School of Science, University of Greenwich.

== Publishing activity ==
To a considerable extent, the publishing activity at the Faculty goes hand in hand with the scientific research conducted by the academic staff. The Faculty publishes the academic journal Filomat (IF 0.753) which features articles in the fields of mathematics and computer science. In the same area, two more journals are published, Functional Analysis, Approximation and Computation (FAAC) and Matematika i informatika, whereas the journal Biologica Nyssana is devoted to research in biology. The academic staff at the Faculty also takes part in the publishing of the two series of the journal Facta Universitatis – Physics, Chemistry and Technology and Mathematics and Informatics.

For the purpose of fostering the educational process, 146 textbooks, workbooks, and monographs authored by the Faculty's academic staff have been published.

The Faculty Library contains textbooks, professional and scientific literature and reference books that are used for all study programs at the Faculty. The Library owns 36,043 bibliographic units primarily in the area of natural and mathematical sciences.
