= Crime that Changed Serbia =

1995 documentary by Janko Baljak

See You in the Obituary
- Directed by: Janko Baljak
- Written by: Aleksandar Knežević; Vojislav Tufegdžić
- Based on: The Crime that Changed Serbia by: Aleksandar Knežević; Vojislav Tufegdžić
- Edited by: Jovana Krstanović
- Production company: B92
- Release date: 1995
- Running time: 35 minutes
- Country: FR Yugoslavia
- Language: Serbian
- Budget: 5 million YUM

See You in the Obituary (Serbian: Видимо се у читуљи / Vidimo se u čitulji) is a 1995 television documentary directed by Janko Baljak, and scripted by Aleksandar Knežević and Vojislav Tufegdžić. It is based on the book The Crime that Changed Serbia (Serbian: Криминал који је изменио Србију / Kriminal koji je izmenio Srbiju) by Knežević and Tufegdžić and was produced by the Belgrade-based independent news broadcaster B92.

The unprecedented contacts and subsequent interviews with the criminals would have not been possible had not Knežević and Tufegdžić been covering the post of organised crime in their respective magazines, gaining the trust of the depicted characters. In more than 90 percent of cases Knežević and Tugedžić, due to the dangerous circumstances that required extreme caution and as small film crew as possible, were accompanied only by a camera operator.

Made in the form of an extended news report and narrated by journalist Dina Čolić-Anđelković, the film presents a snapshot of the chaotic Belgrade criminal underworld in the early 1990s which sprung up against the backdrop of Yugoslav wars. The film is composed of fragments from interviews with individuals directly involved with criminal activities either through perpetrating them or through trying to stop them.

Over the years the film developed a cult following, mainly due to its raw authenticity, characters interviewed, and the portrayal of the politically, economically and socially turbulent period of the early and mid 1990s in Serbia.

== Synopsis ==
As the opening credits roll the film begins with shots of the infamous Milorad Ulemek (later commander of the Serbian police Special Operations Unit who was convicted for his role in the 2003 assassination of Prime Minister Zoran Đinđić) inspecting troops. Ulemek is not mentioned by name as he was still very much unknown to the Serbian general public at the time.

The narrator Dina Čolić-Anđelković sets the tone by informing the audience that although Serbia was not directly and officially involved in the Yugoslav Wars, the country still very much felt its effects: country is under the United Nations trade embargo, the inflation rate is skyrocketing, streets of Serbian cities are flooded with weapons, and the brain drain is in full swing with young professionals leaving abroad. At the same time many local career criminals plying their trade in Western Europe have returned home to take advantage of the chaotic situation.

To further its point, the narration refers to the heinous crime that occurred on 1 December 1993 in the Belgrade municipality of Novi Beograd. Two returnees from the frontlines, Ilija Vujić and Darko Lončarić, broke during early afternoon into the apartment at Pohorska Street inhabited by Verica Židić and her 13-year-old son Davor. Vujić shot the mother in the liver, a technique he learned in the war that apparently allows the victim to live a little longer before succumbing, in order to have enough time to question her about her savings they were after. He then proceeded to kill her son as well. Belgrade police inspector Ljuba Milanović is then interviewed about the gruesome double murder. He says that during questioning, Vujić's response to their question as to why he killed the son was: "Fuck the kid, he was supposed to be in school at that time of day, anyway." Narrator then says that before being apprehended by police, Vujić and Lončarić had recounted their crime in detail in a packed Belgrade cafe. None of the cafe guests who had heard the story found it necessary to call the police. In the end, Vujić received the death penalty.

The movie then shifts to interviews with various Belgrade gangsters. While some of them act through close-knit criminal clans, others seem to be freelancers. Many of them have also done work for the Serbian state security agencies.

The movie ends with showing funerals of three actors that were killed during the production of the movie.

Kristijan Golubović is one of few actors in the series still alive today.

=== Curiosities ===
Author and screenplay writer Aleksandar Knežević became an Eastern Orthodox monk and as Fr Romilo lives in the Monastery of Hilandar on Mount Athos, Greece. Knežević is also the author of the book 'Time and Cognition;Theological Reading of Marcel Proust' (Orthodox Theological Faculty of Belgrade, 2011 - the work is Knežević's MPhil thesis defended in 2010 at the Department for the Theory of Literature, Faculty of Philology, University of Belgrade). At the moment, Knežević is doing his doctorate in theology at Balliol College, University of Oxford.

== See also ==
- Serbian mafia
- Crime in Serbia
- Dizelaši, youth sub-culture

== Sources ==
- Crime that Changed Serbia full movie
- "Another Truth: Recent Serbian documentaries at the Raindance Film Festival", by Maria Vidali, Central Europe Review, Vol 1, No 18, 25 October 1999
