= Vanja Ejdus =

Serbian actress

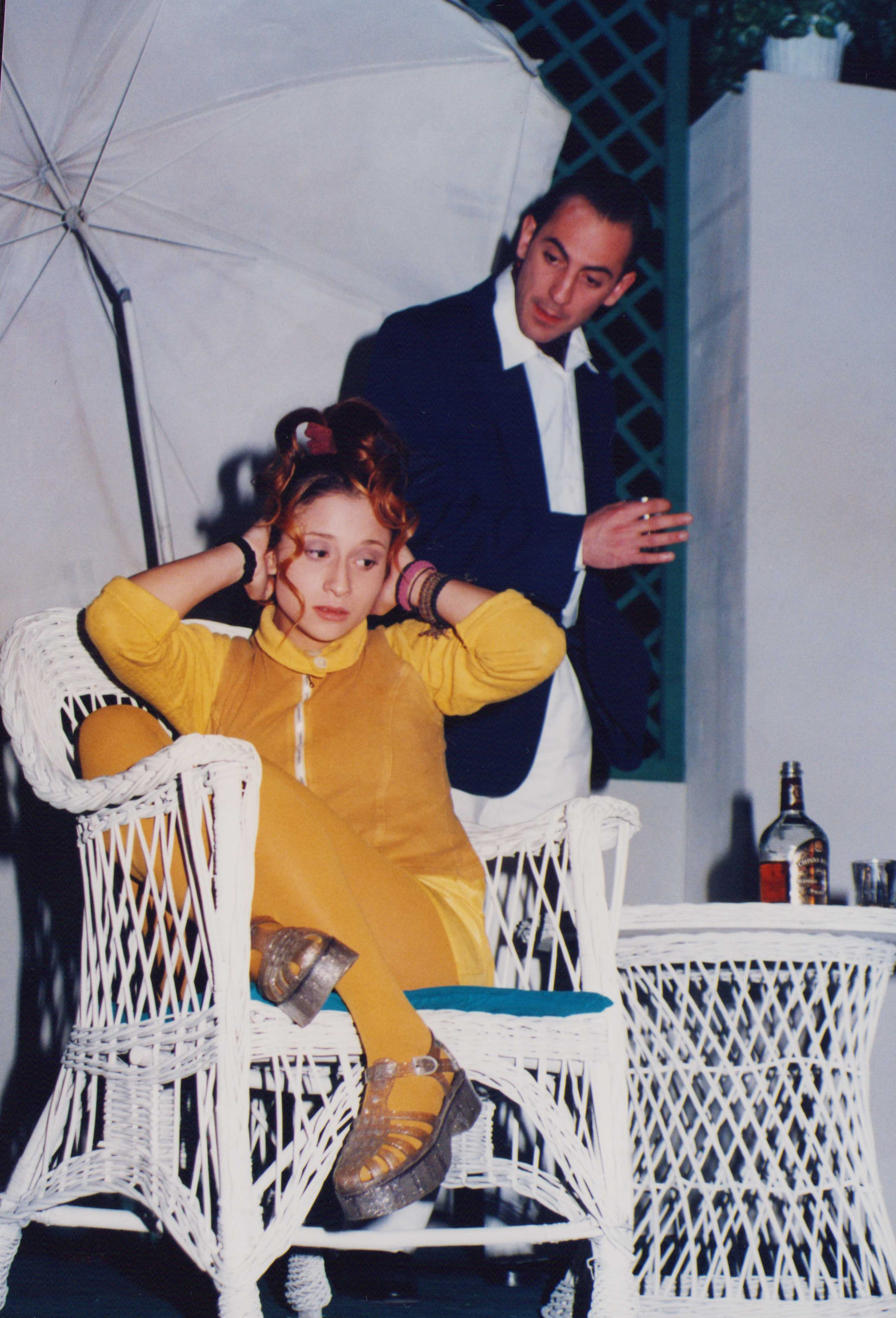
- Born: 1 November 1976 (age 48); Belgrade, SFR Yugoslavia

Vanja Ejdus (Serbian Cyrillic: Вања Ејдус; born 1 November 1976) is a Serbian actress.

== Early life and education ==
Born in Belgrade, Ejdus is the eldest child of actor Predrag Ejdus and his wife Milica, an architect; her father's grandparents were among the Jewish people of Belgrade killed in the Holocaust. She studied acting at the Faculty of Dramatic Arts, winning the Sterija award in 2002 while still a student for her role in an adaptation of Hasanaginica.

== Career ==
As of November 2010, Ejdus had had roles in approximately twenty stage and film productions. In 2009, she played Marina in Wait for Me and I Will Not Come.

== Personal life ==
Ejdus and her husband, Ivan Kostić, an expert in Arabic language and literature, have a daughter.

== Selected filmography ==
- Yu (2003)
- Wait for Me and I Will Not Come (2009)
