= Niš Symphony Orchestra =

Serbian orchestra

- symphony orchestra
- Founded: 1953 (73 years ago)
- Location: Niš, Serbia
- Website: simfonijski.com

The Niš Symphony Orchestra (Serbian: Нишки симфонијски оркестар / Niški simfonijski orkestar) is an orchestra, based in the city of Niš, Serbia. It was the first orchestra to be based outside of Serbia's capital, Belgrade, and is therefore highly valued.

== See also ==
- Music of Niš
- List of orchestras
