= University of Niš Faculty of Arts =

- Факултет уметности Универзитета у Нишу
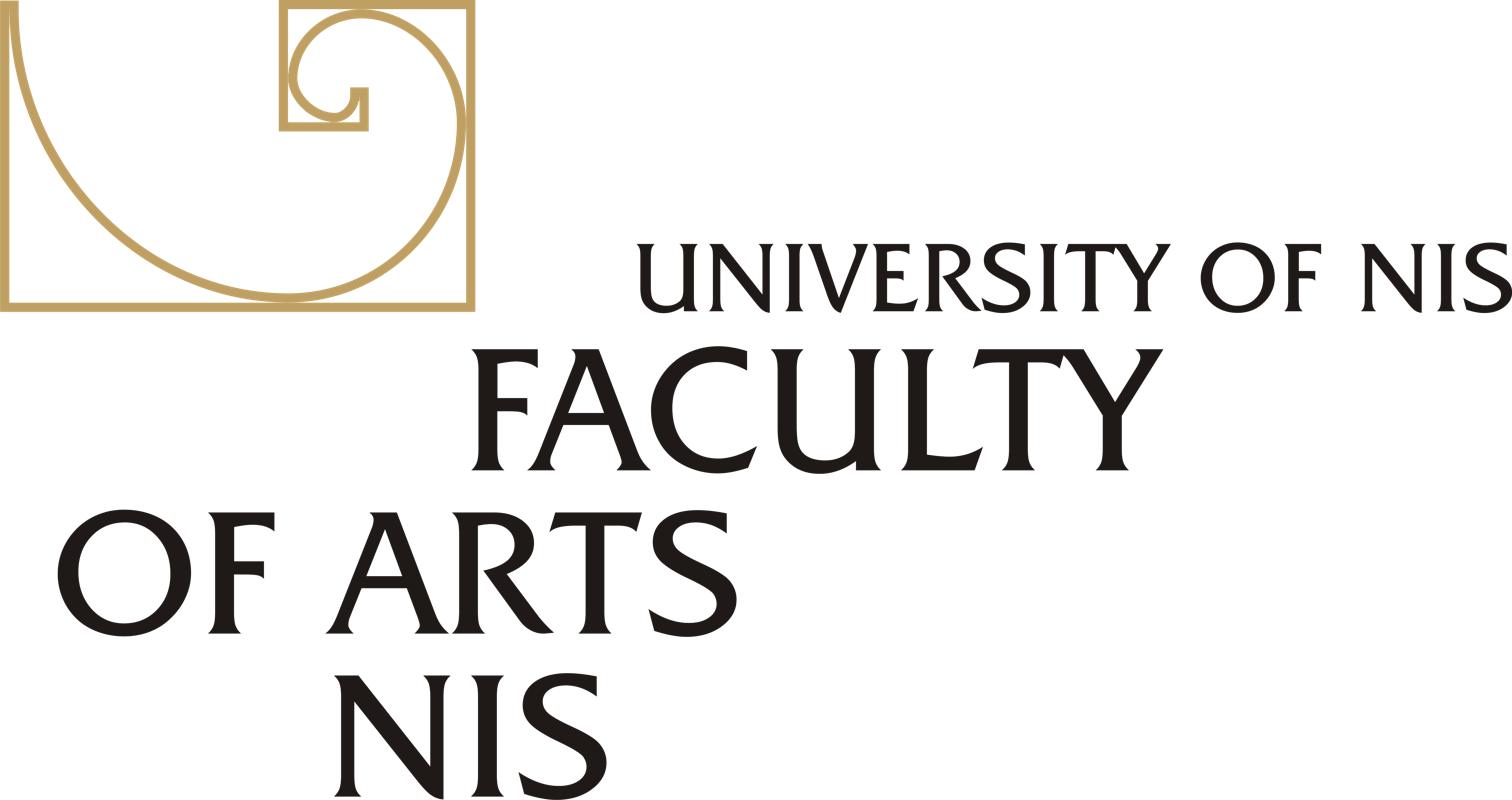
- Official logo
- Established: 3 October 2002; 23 years ago
- Dean: Suzana Kostić
- Academic staff: 111 (2018–19)
- Students: 291 (2018–19)
- Undergraduates: 250 (2018–19)
- Postgraduates: 41 (2018–19)
- Doctoral students: 0 (2018–19)
- Location: Niš, Serbia; 43°19′23″N 21°53′36″E
- Website: www.artf.ni.ac.rs

The Faculty of Arts in Niš (Serbian: Факултет уметности Универзитета у Нишу, romanized: Fakultet umetnosti Univerziteta u Nišu) is an independent department of the University of Niš in Niš, Serbia.

The Faculty was established on 3 October 2002 by the Government of Serbia.

== History ==
=== Department of Visual Arts and Music ===
In 2000, the Department of Visual Arts and Music was created within the Faculty of Philosophy. Its original programs were in Visual Arts, Applied Arts, and Music. The Faculty was place into small quarters in the College of Music building

The original faculty council contained seven members; its task was to set up the regular Faculty bodies and create policies for developing the faculty. All educational issues were handled by this temporary council, Đuro Radonjić, associate professor of the Faculty of Philosophy in Niš, was appointed Acting Dean of the Faculty and Suzana Kostić was elected Vice Dean for academic affairs.

When the temporary council was created, the Serbian Ministry of Education created a plan for the implementation of four-year undergraduate studies in the field of Music and five-year undergraduate studies in the areas of Applied and Visual Arts. On 22 October 2002, the Temporary Council adopted the Faculty Statute and Annual Work Program, and finalized the process of recruitment and appointment of the teaching staff.

=== Faculty of Arts ===
In the 2003–2004 academic year, the first class of students at the Faculty of Arts was admitted. The faculty bodies were created in December 2003 and the Temporary Council was disbanded.

In 2004, Professor Doctor Dragoslav Aćimović was elected Faculty Dean. He was reelected on1 October 2006, 30 September 2009, and 1 October 2009. Aćimović resigned on 30 September 2012. In April 2012, Professor Doctor Suzana Kostić, was elected Dean for the period 1 October 2012 to 30 September 2015.

In compliance with the 2005 Law on Higher Education, the Faculty Council adopted its new Statute on 2 November 2006, and the Senate of the University of Niš passed a resolution on approval of the study programs offered by the Faculty at the level of bachelor's and master's degrees. The Faculty received accreditation for all the study programs conducted at the bachelor's and master's level.

As of 2017, 707 students had graduated from the Faculty, and 57 students had completed their master studies.

== Study programs ==
- Department of Music Art
- Department of Visual Arts
- Department of Applied Arts
