= Milan Marić (actor, born 1981) =

Serbian actor

- Милан Марић
- Born: 26 September 1981 (age 45); Belgrade, SR Serbia, SFR Yugoslavia
- Occupation: Actor
- Years active: 1998–present

Milan Marić (Serbian Cyrillic: Милан Марић; born 26 September 1981) is a Serbian actor, best known for his role in The Wounds.

== Biography ==
Milan Marić was born in 1981 in Belgrade.

In 1998 he had his cinematic debut in the film The Wounds, in the lead role of Shvaba.

His next work was in 2004, in the drama film Breathe Deeply, where he played a supporting part. A year later, the actor appeared in the comedy We are not Angels-2, where he again starred in an episodic role, of a businessman.

In 2007, Milan appeared in a television project, crime drama Storks will Return. Later there was a continuation of the film entitled Storks in the Fog, where Milan Marić also played.

In 2009, the drama Forbidden Love with Milan was released on Serbian cinema screens, followed two years later by the premiere of the LGBT comedy The Parade.

In 2010 he appeared in the reality show Veliki brat, a Serbian version of the Big Brother.

The 2013 film Mamaroš was particularly significant in the actor's career. The film about the life of "mama's boy" Pera Ilić (Bogdan Diklić), a Belgorod cinema projectionist, was shown at the Moscow International Film Festival.

== Selected filmography ==
=== Film ===
- The Wounds (1998)
- The Parade (2011)
- Mamaroš (2013)

=== TV ===
- Big Brother VIP (2010)
