= Toma Prošev =

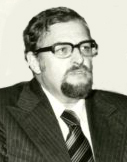
Toma Prošev

Toma Prošev (Macedonian: Тома Прошев) (1931–1996) was a Macedonian composer and professor.

== Education ==
He completed his postgraduate studies at the Ljubljana Music Academy under Prof. L.M. Škerjanc and under Nadia Boulanger in Paris. In 1968, Prošev founded the Saint Sophia Ensemble for Contemporary Music in Skopje. In 1981 he began his doctorate in musicology at the Sarajevo Music Academy.
