= Radoslav Milenković =

Serbian actor and theatre director (born 1958)

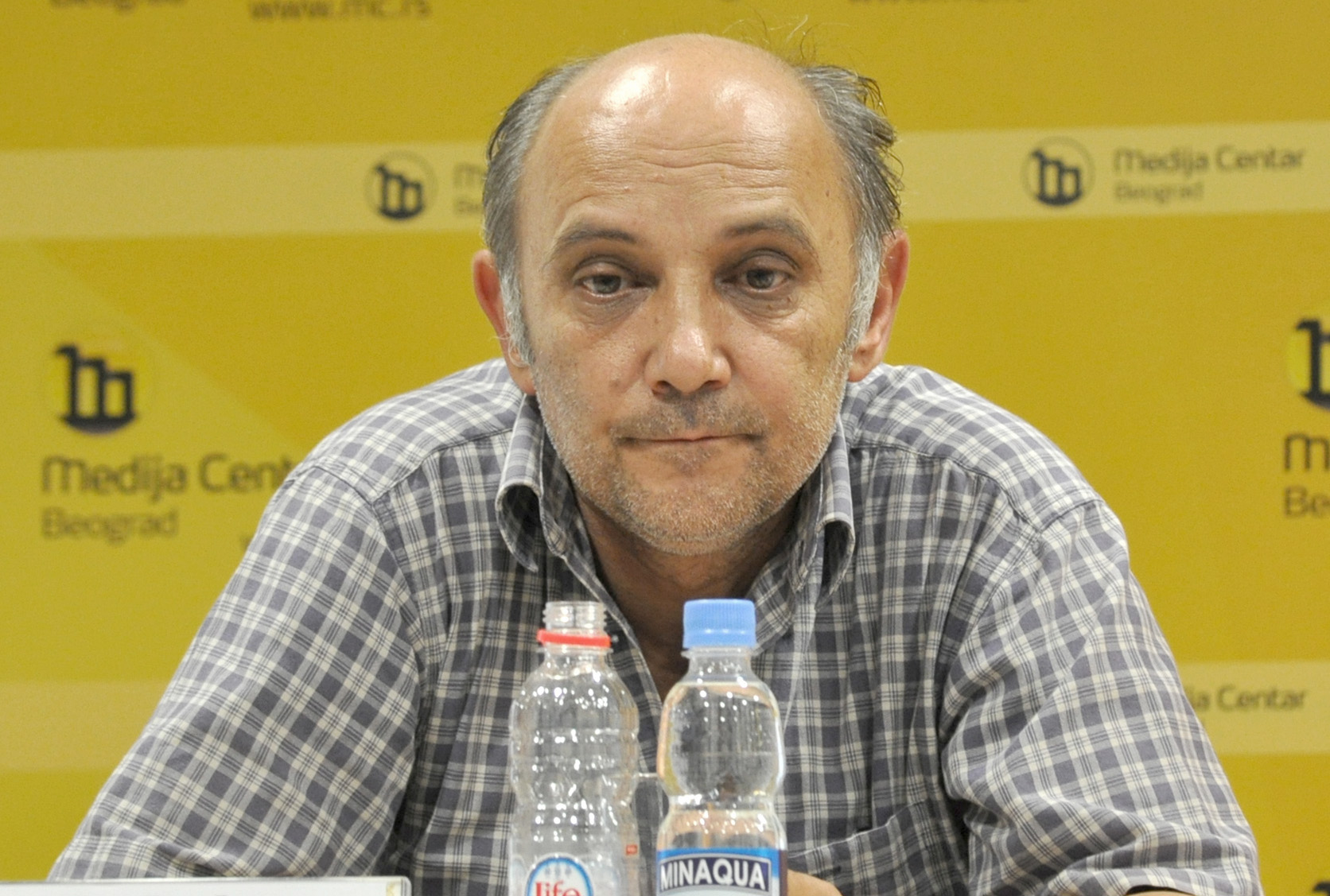
- Milenković at Media Center
- Born: Radoslav Milenković; 17 February 1958 (age 68); Novi Sad, Serbia, Yugoslavia
- Other names: Rale
- Education: Academy of Arts
- Alma mater: University of Novi Sad
- Occupations: Actor, theatre director
- Years active: 1977–present

Radoslav "Rale" Milenković (Serbian Cyrillic: Радослав "Рале" Миленковић; born 17 February 1958) is a Serbian actor and theatre director. He has won the most prestigious awards for acting and directing at many festivals in Serbia and the former Yugoslavia.

Milenković was born in Novi Sad, Serbia, Yugoslavia. He has graduated from the University of Novi Sad Academy of Arts in the class of Branko Pleša. He later graduated theatre director studies at the University of Arts School of Dramatic Arts in the class of Dejan Mijač. He was a member of Yugoslav Drama Theatre from 1987 to 2005. Since then, he is a prominent drama director of the Serbian National Theatre.
