= University of Niš =

University in Serbia

- Универзитет у Нишу; Univerzitet u Nišu
- Type: Public
- Established: 15 June 1965; 61 years ago
- Budget: €38.65 million (2020, planned; public funding)
- Rector: Dragan Antić
- Academic staff: 1,513 (2023–24)
- Students: 22,000 (2023–24)
- Undergraduates: 18,038 (2023–24)
- Postgraduates: 2,641 (2023–24)
- Doctoral students: 1,320 (2023–24)
- Location: Niš, Serbia; 43°19′23″N 21°53′36″E
- Website: www.ni.ac.rs

University rankings

Global – Overall
- QS World: 1201–1400 (2023)
- USNWR Global: 1556 (2023)

Regional – Overall
- QS Emerging Europe and Central Asia: 140 (2023)

The University of Niš (Serbian: Универзитет у Нишу, romanized: Univerzitet u Nišu) is a public university in Serbia. It was founded in 1965. As of 2023–24 academic year, it consists of 13 faculties with 1,513 academic staff and 22,000 students.

It has a university library "Nikola Tesla"; the Faculty of Technology is located in Leskovac, Pedagogy Faculty in Vranje and Agriculture Faculty in Kruševac.

== History ==
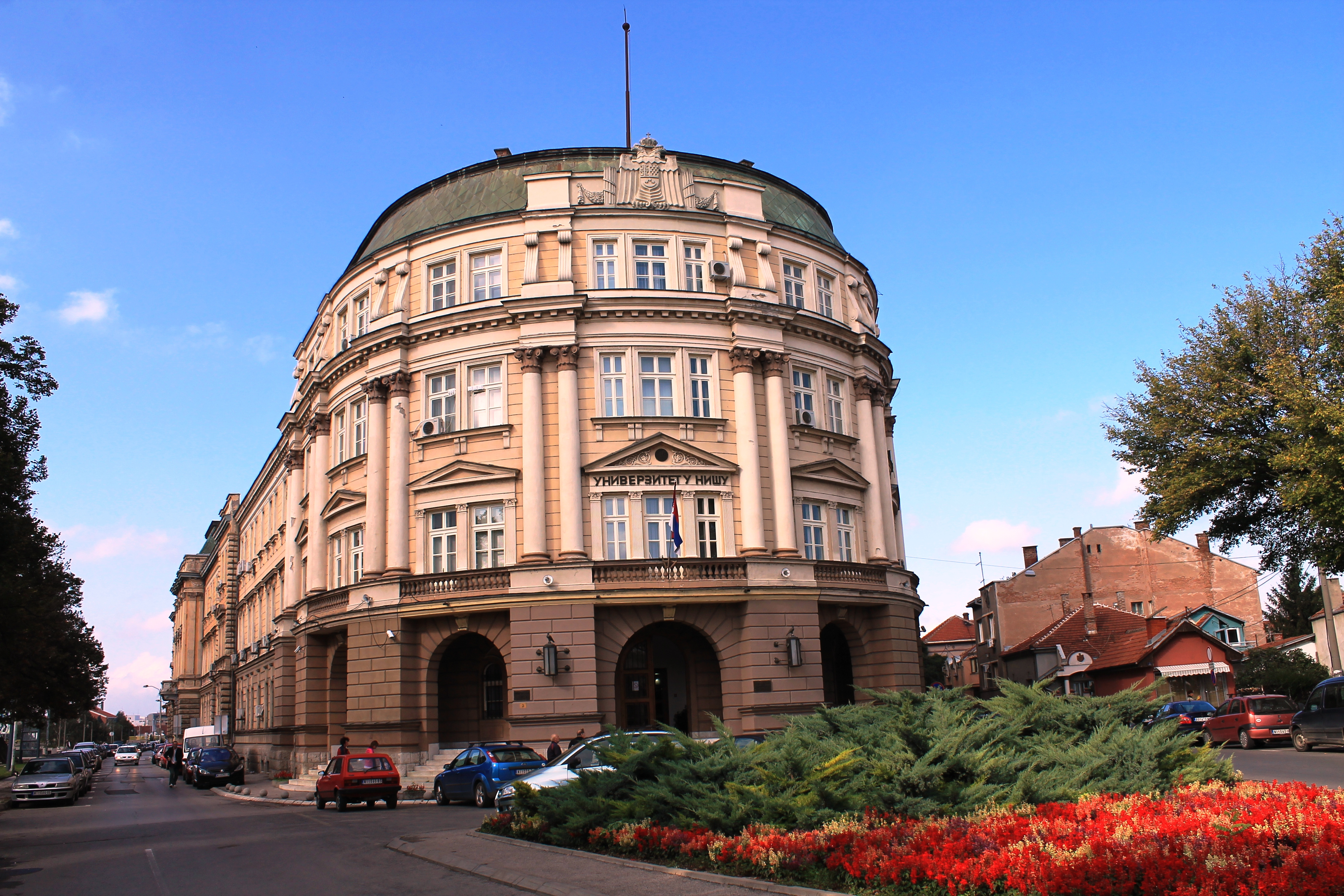
Old District Building, university administration building

The University of Niš was incorporated as an independent degree-granting institution on 15 June 1965.

In 1960 the first undergraduate programs commenced in Niš under the academic patronage of the University of Belgrade. They were institutionalized as the faculties of Law & Economics, Medicine, and Engineering.

The university started its independent life with 234 full-time teaching staff and 6,800 students.

== Timeline ==
- 1968: the Department of Electronics grew into the Faculty of Electronic Engineering;
- 1970: the two departments of the Faculty of Law and Economics became independent faculties;
- 1971: the Departments of Mechanical and Civil Engineering became separate, independent faculties. In the same year, the Faculty of Philosophy was established with seven departments: Mathematics, Physics, Chemistry, Sociology, Psychology, English and Physical Education;
- 1972: the Faculty of Occupational Safety grew out of the Faculty of Civil Engineering;
- 1979: the Faculty of Technology was founded;
- 1987: the Faculty of Philosophy grew to include the Department of Serbian Language and Literature;
- 1993: the Teacher-Training Faculty in Vranje enrolled its first generation of students;
- 1995: the Faculty of Civil Engineering expended its academic mission to include a new Department of Architecture which was consequently added to its name;
- 1998: the academic structure of the Faculty of Philosophy widened to include the Department of History. In the same year the Faculty of Fine Art and the Faculty of Applied Art and Design of the Belgrade University of Art opened their academic divisions in Niš;
- 1999: the Faculty of Science and Mathematics and the Faculty of Physical Culture grew out of the Faculty of Philosophy;
- 2000: six new departments began: Geography and Biology with Ecology (adjoined to the Faculty of Science and Mathematics), Philosophy, Pedagogy, Slavic & Balkan Studies and Fine Arts (attached to the Faculty of Philosophy);
- 2002: the Faculty of Fine Arts was established with three study options — for visual arts, applied arts and music — previously functioning in the Department of Fine Arts of the Faculty of Philosophy;
- 2004: a new department was formed at the Faculty of Philosophy: Department for Journalism;
- 2008: the Department of Serbian Language and Literature of the Faculty of Philosophy was divided into the Department of Serbian Language and Department of Serbian and Comparative Literature.
- 2013: a new department was formed at the Faculty of Philosophy: Department for French language;
- 2017: Faculty of Agriculture in Kruševac was established

== Organization ==
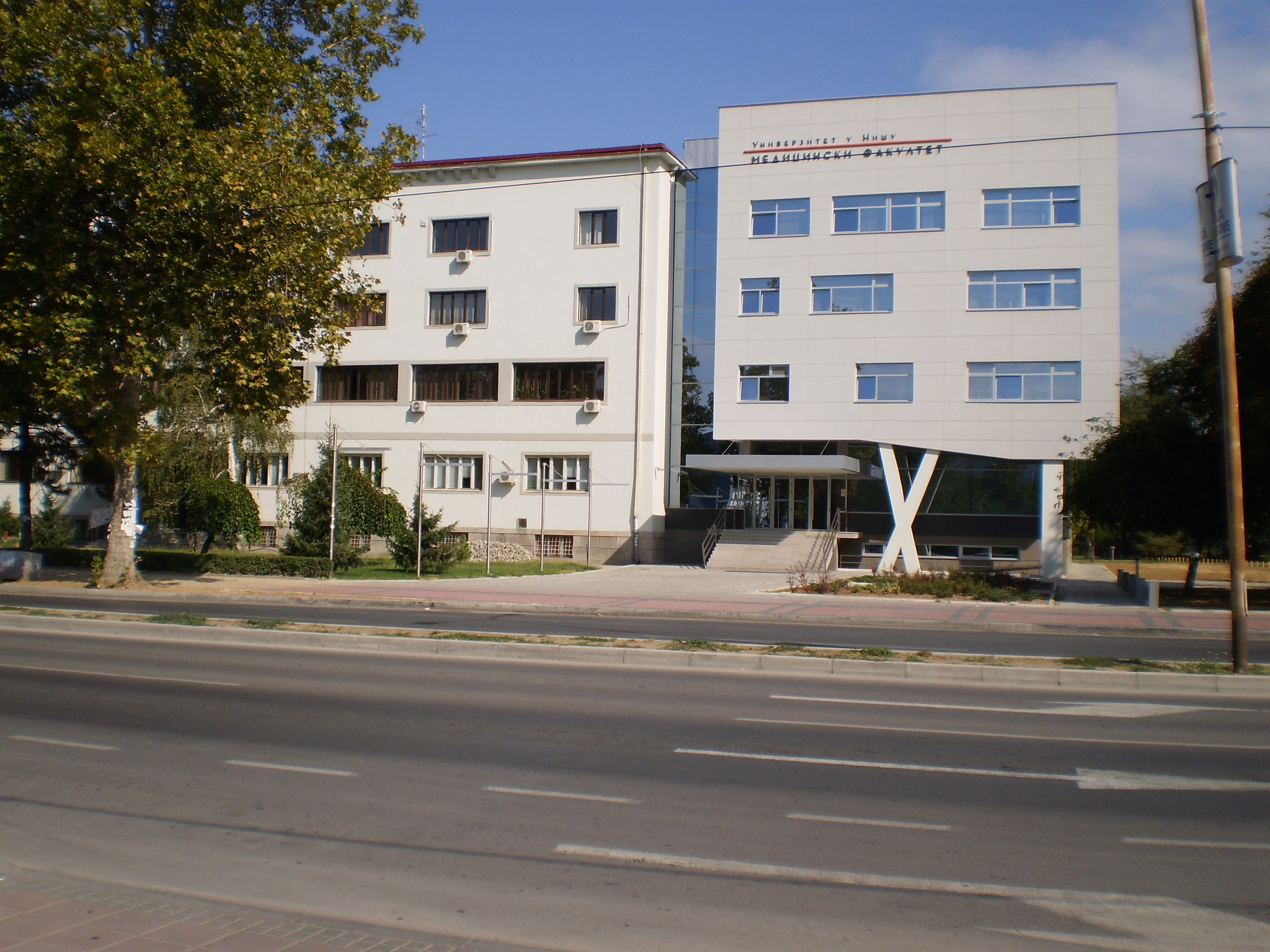
Building of the Faculty of Medicine

Most of the schools have a structure consisting of departments, divisions or majors, offering study and research opportunities at the undergraduate and graduate levels, including opportunities to obtain doctoral degrees. As of 2023–24 academic year, it has 1,513 academic staff members and 22,000 students.

The schools of the University of Niš with data about location, academic staff and number of students as of 2023–24 academic year:

Faculty	Location	Academic staff	Students
Philosophy	Niš	166	3,790
Electronics	Niš	160	3,324
Medicine	Niš	348	3,290
Economics	Niš	65	2,444
Law	Niš	46	2,301
Civil Engineering & Architecture	Niš	83	1,419
Mechanical Engineering	Niš	97	1,415
Science & Mathematics	Niš	218	1,270
Sport & Physical Education	Niš	53	932
Occupational Safety	Niš	49	717
Technology	Leskovac	50	390
Arts	Niš	102	294
Pedagogy	Vranje	43	250
Agriculture	Kruševac	33	164
Total		1,513	20,706

So far, more than 49,000 students have graduated from the university, 2,254 have earned master's degree and 1,275 have successfully defended their doctoral dissertations.

== University building ==
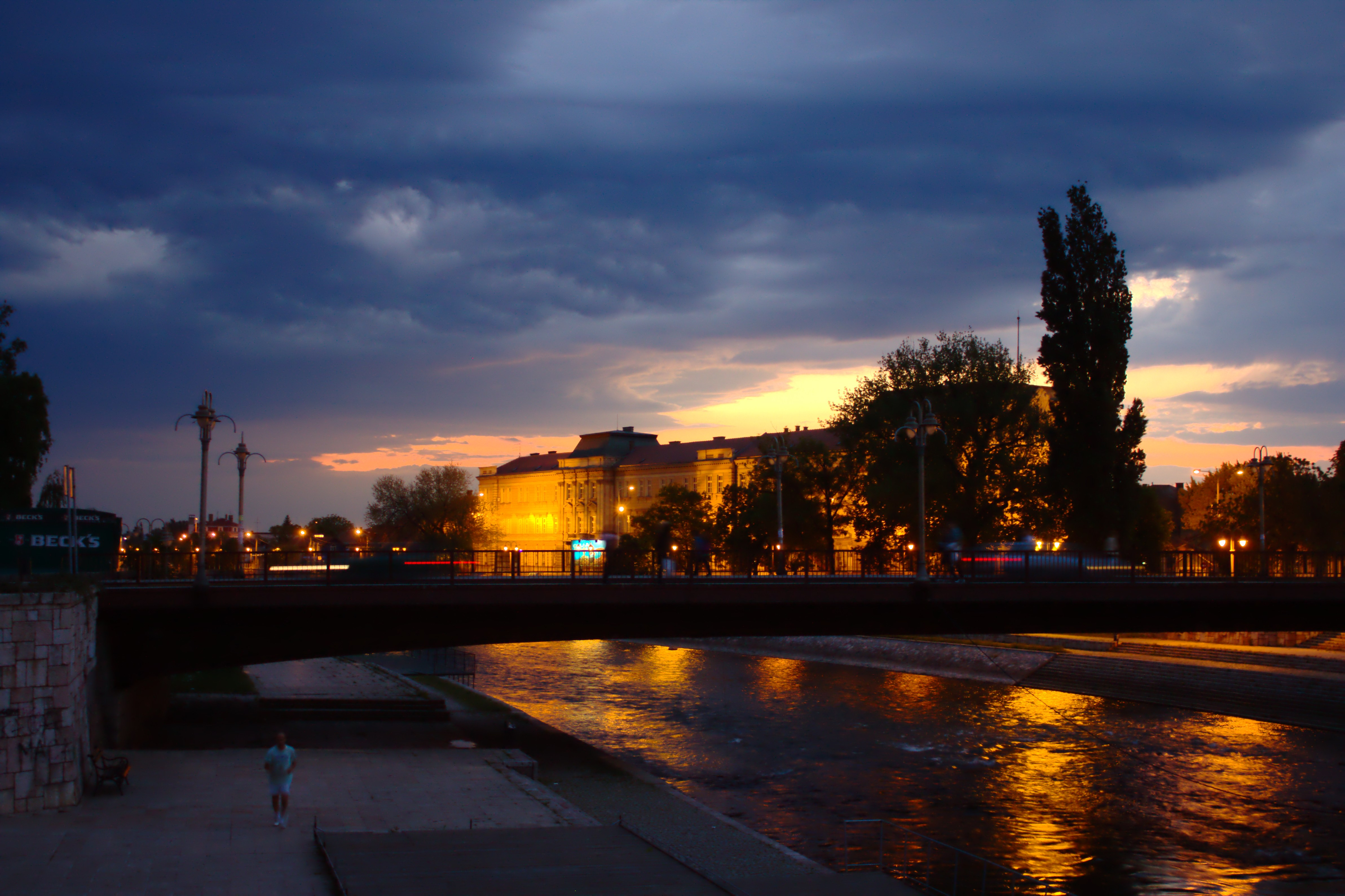
University from the Nišava River

The university main offices are in one of the most representative city structures, an edifice built in the late 19th century, which was formally recognized as a cultural treasure of major significance in 1979.

The building was constructed in 1887, in the city center, on the right bank of the river Nisava. The building is in the neo-Renaissance style, designed by an unknown Viennese architect. It first housed the District Court, the District Government and the military headquarters and then, from July 26, 1914 to October 16, 1915, when Niš was the Serbian war capital, the building was the seat of the Serbian government and its Ministry of the Interior. The formal declaration of war was directed from Austria-Hungary on July 28, 1914 to the building.

In 1930, the building became the administrative seat of the Morava County, after the World War II it housed the District Administration, while in 1967 it was assigned to the permanent use to the university.

In 2008, marking the 120th anniversary of its building, the university completed construction work to enable access for persons with disabilities to all university facilities.

== Notable alumni ==
- Radovan Lale Djuric - artist

== See also ==
- List of universities in Serbia
