= List of Serbian films =

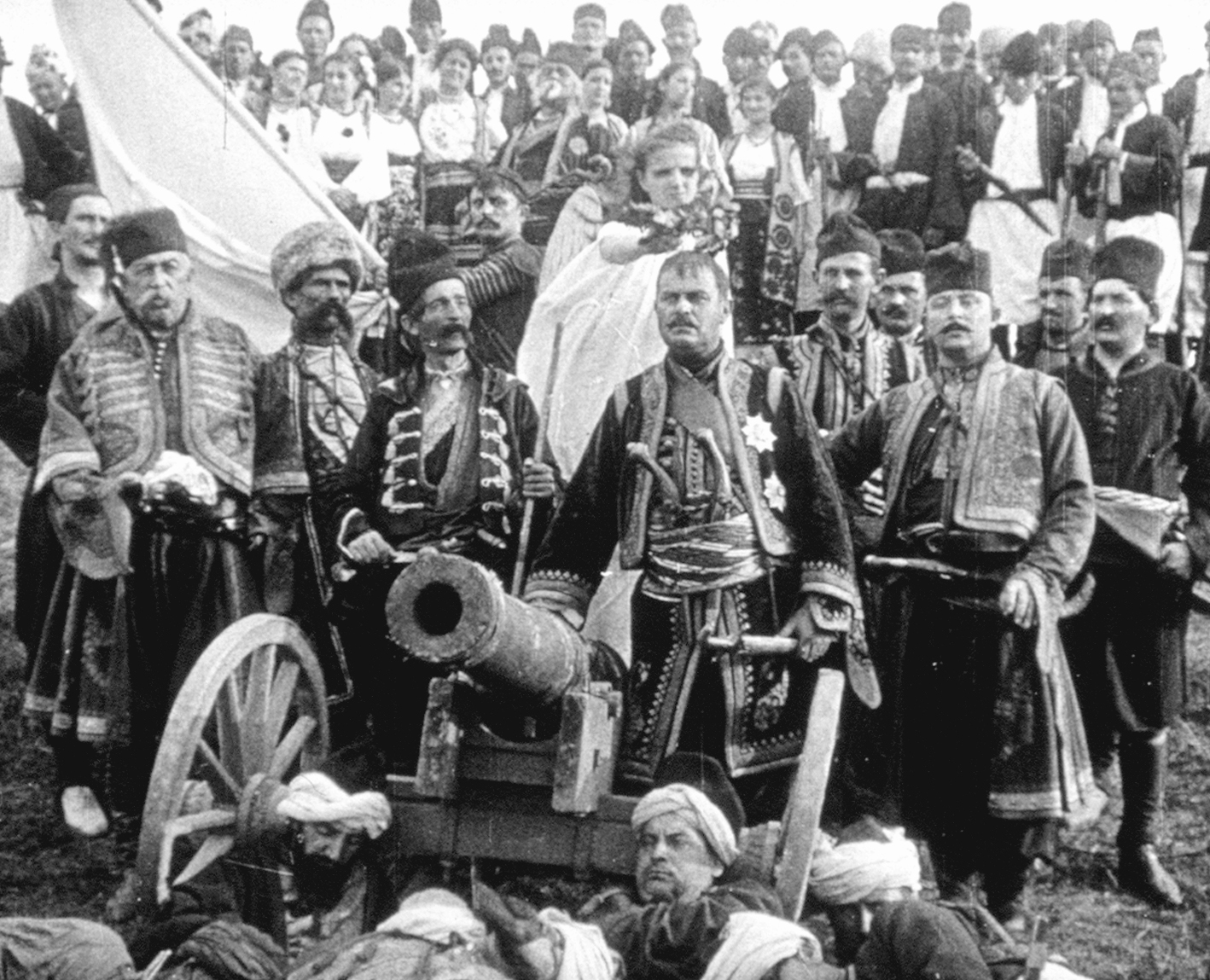
A still from The Life and Deeds of the Immortal Leader Karađorđe, the first feature film released in the Balkans.

List of Serbian films encompasses films produced by the Cinema of Serbia. Serbia again became an independent country in 2006, after the dissolution of Serbia and Montenegro.

For an A-Z list see Category:Serbian films

== 1900s ==
| Title | Director | Cast | Genre | Notes |
|---|---|---|---|---|
1904
| The Coronation of King Peter the First | Arnold Muir Wilson, Frank Mottershaw | | Documentary | |

== 1910s ==
| Title | Director | Cast | Genre | Notes |
|---|---|---|---|---|
1910
1911
| Karađorđe | Ilija Stanojević-Čiča | | Historical/War | |
| Ulrih Celjski i Vladislav Hunjadi | Ilija Stanojević-Čiča | | Historical/War | |
1912
| Dolazak prvih srpskih ranjenika u Beograd | | | Documentary | |
| Dolazak prvih turskih ranjenika u Beograd | | | Documentary | |
| Jadna majka | Božidar Savić | | Short | |
1913
1914
1915
| Spasilac | Vladimir Totović | | Short | |
1916
| Lopov kao detektiv | Vladimir Totović | | Short | |
1917
1918
1919

== 1920s ==
| Title | Director | Cast | Genre | Notes |
|---|---|---|---|---|
1920
1921
1922
| Tragedija naše dece | Petar Dobrinović | | Drama/Short | |
1923
| Za koru hleba | Milutin Nikolić | | Short | |
| Kačaci u Topčideru | Dragan Aleksić/Duško Tokin | | | |
| Proslava Kumanovske bitke | | | Documentary | |
1924
1925
1926
1927
| Grešnica bez greha | Kosta Novaković | | Drama | |
| Kralj Čarlstona | Kosta Novaković | | Comedy | |
1928
1929
| Belje | Miodrag Đorđević | | Documentary | |
| Kroz buru i oganj | Milutin Ignjačević/Ranko Jovanović | | | |

== 1930s ==
| Title | Director | Cast | Genre | Notes |
|---|---|---|---|---|
1930
1931
1932
| Sa verom u Boga | Mihajlo Popović | | Drama/War | |
1933
1934
1935
1936
1937
1938
1939

== 1940s ==
| Title | Director | Cast | Genre | Notes |
|---|---|---|---|---|
1940
1941
1942
| Innocence Unprotected | Dragoljub Aleksić | | Drama | |
1943
1944
1945
1946
1947
1948
1949

== 1990s ==
| Title | Director | Cast | Genre | Notes |
|---|---|---|---|---|
1990
1991
1992
| Crni bombarder The Black Bomber | Darko Bajić | Dragan Bjelogrlić, Anica Dobra, Srđan Žika Todorović | Drama | |
| Mi nismo anđeli We Are Not Angels | Srđan Dragojević | Nikola Kojo, Milena Pavlović, Branka Katić, Sonja Savić | Comedy | |
| Tito i ja Tito and Me | Goran Marković | Lazar Ristovski, Dimitrije Vojinov, Predrag Miki Manojlović, Anica Dobra | Comedy | |
| Tango Argentino | Goran Paskaljević | Mija Aleksić, Predrag Miki Manojlović, Rahela Ferari, Predrag Laković, Mića Tomić | Drama | |
| Policajac sa Petlovog Brda | Mihailo Vukobratović | Ljubiša Samardžić, Branka Katić, Maja Sabljić, Milena Dravić, Neda Arnerić, Svetlana Bojković | Family Comedy | |
| Velika frka | Milan Jelić | Dragan Nikolić, Olivera Marković, Radmila Živković, Mića Tomić | Comedy | |
| Uvod u drugi život | Milos 'Misa' Radivojevic | Aleksandar Bercek | Science fiction | |
| Dama koja ubija Lady Killer | Zoran Čalić | Bata Živojinović, Boro Stjepanović | Comedy | |
| Jevreji dolaze The Jews are coming | Prvoslav Marić | Meto Jovanovski, Slobodan Ćustić | Drama | |
1993
| Bolje od bekstva Better than escape | Miroslav Lekić | Žarko Laušević, Claire Beckman | Drama, Romance | |
| Tri karte za Holivud | Božidar Bota Nikolić | Branislav Lečić, Danilo Lazović, Bogdan Diklić, Vesna Stanojević | Comedy | |
| Vizantijsko plavo Byzantine Blue | Dragan Marinković | Lazar Ristovski, Katarina Žutić | Fantasy, Romance | |
| Gorila se kupa u podne Gorilla Bathes at Noon | Dušan Makavejev | Svetozar Cvetković | Comedy | |
| Kaži zašto me ostavi Say Why Have You Left Me | Oleg Novković | Žarko Laušević, Milica Mihajlović, Katarina Gojković, Ljubiša Samardžić | War Drama | |
| Obračun u Kazino Kabareu | Zoran Čalić | Dragan Nikolić, Slobodan Boda Ninković, Neda Arnerić, Dragomir Bojanoć Gidra | Comedy | |
| Pun Mesec nad Beogradom; Full Moon Over Belgrade | Dragan Kresoja | Dragan Bjelogrlić, Ružica Sokić, Rade Marković | Horror | |
1994
| Biće bolje Getting better | Milan Živković | Dragan Nikolić, Slobodan Ninković | Comedy, Drama | |
| Dnevnik uvreda 1993. A Diary of Insults | Zdravko Šotra | Vera Čukić, Marko Nikolić | Drama | |
| Ni na nebu, ni na zemlji In the middle of nowhere | Miloš Miša Radivojević | Svetozar Cvetković, Branislav Lečić, Zoran Cvijanović | Drama | |
| Rođen kao ratnik Born to be a warrior | Guido Zurli | Rik Battaglia, Slobodan Ćustić, Goran Daničić | Action, Drama | |
| Skerco | Mladomir Puriša Đorđević | Dragomir Čumić, Lidija Boričić, Mirčeta Vujičić | Drama | |
| Slatko od snova | Vladimir Živković | Dragana Mirković, Bata Živojinović | Comedy, Musical, Romance | |
| Vukovar, jedna priča Vukovar poste restante | Boro Drašković | Mirjana Joković, Boris Isaković | War Drama | |
1995
| Dupe od mramora Marble Ass | Želimir Žilnik | Aleksandar Brujić, Vjeran Miladinović | Comedy, Drama, War | Entered into the 19th Moscow International Film Festival |
| Paket aranžman Package arrangement | Ivan Stefanović, Dejan Zečević, Srdan Golubović | Milica Mihajlović, Boris Milivojević | Comedy | Omnibus |
| Podzemlje; Underground | Emir Kusturica | Predrag Miki Manojlović, Lazar Ristovski, Mirjana Joković | Drama, Comedy | Won the Palme d'Or at Cannes |
| Tamna je noć | Dragan Kresoja | Jelisaveta Seka Sablić, Predrag Ejdus, Branka Katić, Nenad Jezdić, Dragan Mićanović | War Drama | |
| Terasa na krovu | Gordan Mihić | Ivana Mihić, Marko Nikolić, Petar Božović | Drama | |
| Treća sreća Third time lucky | Dragoslav Lazić | Radoš Bajić, Bata Živojinović | Comedy | |
| Tuđa Amerika; Someone Else's America | Goran Paskaljević | Miki Manojlović, Sergej Trifunović | Drama | |
| Ubistvo s predumišljajem Premeditated Murder | Gorčin Stojanović | Nebojša Glogovac, Branka Katić, Ana Sofrenović, Dragan Mićanović | War Drama | |
| Urnebesna tragedija Hilarious Tragedy | Goran Marković | Voja Brajović, Rade Šerbedžija, Vesna Trivalić, Dragan Nikolić, Danilo Stojković, Olivera Marković | Black Comedy | |
1996
| Doviđenja u Čikagu | Zoran Čalić | Bata Živojinović, Nikola Simić, Lidija Vukićević | Comedy | |
| Lepa sela lepo gore Pretty Village, Pretty Flame | Srđan Dragojević | Dragan Bjelogrlić, Nikola Pejaković, Velimir Bata Živojinović, Nikola Kojo, Dragan Maksimović, Zoran Cvijanović | War | |
| Nečista krv Impure Blood | Stojan Stojcic | Rade Šerbedžija, Ljuba Tadić | Drama | adaptation of the Impure Blood novel written by Borisav Stanković |
| Do koske Rage | Slobodan Skerlić | Lazar Ristovski, Nikola Đuričko, Bojana Maljević | Action | |
1997
| Balkanska Pravila; Balkan Rules | Darko Bajić | Branislav Lečić, Ana Sofrenović, Lazar Ristovski | Action | |
| Ptice koje ne polete Some birds can't fly | Petar Lalović | Velimir Bata Živojinović, Neda Arnerić, Miodrag Krivokapić | Drama | |
| Tango je tužna misao koja se pleše | Mladomir Puriša Đorđević | Dragan Mićanović, Ana Sofrenović, Ljuba Tadić, Sonja Savić | Drama | |
| Tri letnja dana Three Summer Days | Mirjana Vukomanović | Slavko Štimac, Srđan Žika Todorović, Mirjana Joković, Milena Dravić | Drama | |
1998
| Bure baruta Cabaret Balkan | Goran Paskaljević | Nebojša Glogovac, Predrag Miki Manojlović, Mirjana Karanović, Sergej Trifunović, Mirjana Joković, Aleksandar Berček | Comedy/Drama | |
| Crna mačka, beli mačor Black Cat, White Cat | Emir Kusturica | Branka Katić, Srđan Žika Todorović | Comedy | |
| Kupi mi Eliota | Dejan Zečević | Ivana Mihić, Nikola Kojo, Dragan Bjelogrlić | Comedy | |
| Lajanje na zvezde | Zdravko Šotra | Nataša Šolak, Dragan Mićanović, Vesna Trivalić, Nikola Simić, Velimir Bata Živojinović | Comedy | |
| Povratak Lopova Thief's comeback | Miroslav Lekić | Vojislav Brajović, Maja Sabljić, Darko Tomović | Comedy | |
| Rane; The Wounds (film) | Srđan Dragojević | Dragan Bjelogrlić, Branka Katić, Vesna Trivalić | Comedy | |
| Stršljen; The Hornet | Gorčin Stojanović | Sergej Trifunović, Mirjana Joković | Action | |
| Tri palme za dve bitange i ribicu Three Palms for Two Punks and a Babe | Radivoje raša Andrić | Dubravka Mijatović, Srđan Žika Todorović, Milorad Mandić Manda | Comedy | |
| Yugofilm | Goran Rebić | Wolf Bachofner, Aleksandar Jovanovic | Drama | |
1999
| Belo Odelo; The White Suit | Lazar Ristovski | Lazar Ristovski, Dragan Nikolić, Velimir 'Bata' Živojinović, Danilo Stojković | Comedy/Drama | |
| Nebeska Udica; Sky Hook | Ljubiša Samardžić | Nebojša Glogovac, Ana Sofrenović, Milena Dravić | Drama | |
| Ranjena zemlja Wounded land | Dragoslav Lazić | Vera Čukić, Nebojša Glogovac, Petar Kralj, Žarko Laušević | War Drama | |
| Nož; The Knife | Miroslav Lekić | Žarko Laušević, Bojana Maljević, Ljiljana Blagojević, Aleksandar Berček | Drama | Based on novel 'Nož' ('The Knife') by Vuk Drašković |
| Točkovi; Wheels | Đorđe Milosavljević | Dragan Mićanović, Anica Dobra, Ljubiša Samardžić, Nikola Kojo, Bogdan Diklić, Neda Arnerić | Thriller | |

== 2000s ==
| Title | Director | Cast | Genre | Notes |
|---|---|---|---|---|
2000
| Dorćol-Menhetn | Isidora Bjelica | Dalibor Andonov GRU | Drama/Comedy/Romance | |
| Mehanizam; The Mechanism | Đorđe Milosavljević | | Action/Crime | |
| Rat Uživo; War Live | Darko Bajić | Dragan Bjelogrlić, Dubravka Mijatović, Žika Todorović, Tanja Bošković | Drama/Comedy/War | |
| Senke Uspomena; Shadows of Memories | Predrag Velinović | Bata Živojinović | Drama | |
| Tajna porodičnog blaga | Aleksandar Đorđević | | Comedy | |
| Zemlja istine, ljubavi i slobode Land of Truth, Love & Freedom | Milutin Petrović | Boris Milivojević, Rade Marković | Drama/War | |
2001
| Apsolutnih sto Absolute Hundred | Srdan Golubović | Vuk Kostić, Srđan Žika Todorović, Bogdan Diklić | Drama/Action/Thriller | |
| Bumerang; Boomerang | Dragan Marinković | Lazar Ristovski, Paulina Manov | Comedy | |
| Munje! Dudes | Radivoje Raša Andrić | Nikola Đuričko, Sergej Trifunović, Boris Milivojević, Maja Mandžuka | Comedy | |
| Nataša; Natasha | Ljubiša Samardžić | | Drama/Crime | |
| Normalni ljudi | Oleg Novković | | Drama | |
| Ona voli Zvezdu | Marko Marinković | | Comedy | |
| Seljaci | Dragoslav Lazić | | Comedy | |
| Sve je za ljude | Dragoslav Lazić | | Comedy | |
| Virtuelna stvarnost Virtual Reality | Ratiborka Duda Ćeramilac | Maja Mandžuka, Sonja Savić, Dragan Nikolić | Drama/Action/Thriller | |
2002
| Mrtav ladan | Milorad Milinković | Srđan Žika Todorović, Nenad Jezdić, Sonja Kolačarić, Nikola Đuričko, Mihajlo Bata Paskaljević | Comedy | |
| Država nrtvih Janez | Živojin Pavlović, Dinko Tucaković | Radko Polič, Nebojša Glogovac, Milena Pavlović | Drama | |
| Jedan na jedan | Mladen Matičević | | | |
| Kordon; The Cordon | Goran Marković | Marko Nikolić | Drama | |
| Lavirint; The Labyrinth | Miroslav Lekić | Branislav Lečić, Dragan Nikolić, Katarina Radivojević, Maja Sabljić | Adventure/Mystery/Thriller | |
| Mala noćna muzika Little Night Music | Dejan Zečević | Gordan Kičić, Vuk Kostić, Feđa Stojanović | Action/Comedy | |
| Ringeraja | Đorđe Milosavljević | | Comedy | |
| TT sindrom T.T. Syndrome | Dejan Zečević | Nikola Đuričko, Dušica Žegarac, Boris Komnenić | Horror | |
| Zona Zamfirova | Zdravko Šotra | Katarina Radivojević, Vojin Ćetković | Romance/Comedy | From the break-up of Yugoslavia, this is considered as the only film that attracted more than one million viewers in Serbia, by far biggest number, even compared to foreign films. |
2003
| Ledina; Bare Ground | Ljubiša Samardžić | Dragan Bjelogrlić, Ksenija Pajić, Zijah Sokolović | Drama | |
| o11 Beograd | Michael Pfeifenberger | Vanja Ejdus | Drama | |
| Jagoda u supermarketu Strawberry in the Supermarket | Dušan Milić | Dubravka Mijatović, Srđan Žika Todorović, Mirjana Karanović | Comedy/Action | |
| Mali svet A Small World | Miloš Radović | Predrag Miki Manojlović, Lazar Ristovski, Bogdan Diklić | Comedy | |
| Da nije ljubavi, ne bi sveta bilo | Karolj Vicek | Predrag Momcilovic, Irena Abraham | Drama | |
| Profesionalac; The Professional | Dušan Kovačević | Bora Todorović, Branislav Lečić, Nataša Ninković | Drama/Comedy | |
| Sjaj u očima Loving Glances | Srđan Karanović | Milena Dravić, Gorica Popović, Boris Komnenić | Drama | |
| Skoro sasvim obična priča Almost Ordinary Story | Milica Zarić, Stefan Kapičić | Miloš Petričić | Comedy/Romance | |
| Volim te najviše na svetu I think the world of you | Predrag Velinović | Ana Sofrenović, Tanja Bošković, Dragan Petrović | Comedy/Romance | |
2004
| Diši duboko Take a Deep Breath | Dragan Marinković | Ana Franić, Mira Furlan, Bogdan Diklić | Drama | |
| Jesen stiže, dunjo moja Goose Feather | Ljubiša Samardžić | Branislav Trifunović, Kalina Kovačević, Predrag Ejdus | Drama | |
| Kad porastem biću Kengur; When I Grow Up, I'll Be a Kangaroo | Radivoje Raša Andrić | Sergej Trifunović, Marija Karan, Nebojša Glogovac, Gordan Kičić | Comedy | |
| Memo | Miloš Jovanović | Radoje Čupić, Boris Isaković, Lidija Stevanović, Aleksandra Pleskonjić-Ilić | Drama | |
| Pad u raj Falling in the Paradise | Miloš Radović | Lazar Ristovski, Branka Katić | Comedy/War | |
| Pljačka Trećeg rajha | Zdravko Šotra | Dragan Nikolić, Nikola Đuričko | Comedy | |
| Poljupci | Saša Radojević | | Drama | |
| Žurka; Party | Aleksandar Davić | Sonja Savić, Jovana Stipić, Vladimir Tintor | Drama | |
| San zimske noći Midwinter Night's Dream | Goran Paskaljević | Lazar Ristovski | Drama | |
| Sivi kamion crvene boje The Red Colored Grey Truck | Srđan Koljević | Srđan Žika Todorović | Comedy | |
| Život je čudo Life Is a Miracle | Emir Kusturica | Slavko Štimac, Nataša Šolak, Aleksandar Berček, Mirjana Karanović, Vesna Tivalić | Drama/Comedy/War | Entered into the 2004 Cannes Film Festival |
2005
| Balkanska braća | Božidar Bota Nikolić | Petar Božović, Isidora Minić, Goran Šušljik | Drama/Comedy | |
| Buđenje iz Mrtvih; Awaking from The Dead | Miloš Radivojević | Svetozar Cvetković, Ljuba Tadić, Anita Mančić, Aleksandra Janković | Drama | |
| Flert | Radoslav Vojinović, Nikola Mišić, Vladimir Popović, Mladen Šević | | Omnibus | |
| Imam Nešto Važno da vam Kažem | Željko Sošić | | Drama | |
| Ivkova Slava | Zdravko Šotra | Zoran Cvijanović, Nataša Ninković, Anica Dobra, Dragan Bjelogrlić, Srđan Žika Todorović, Milorad Mandić Manda | Comedy | |
| Jug-Jugoistok; South by Southeast | Milutin Petrović | Sonja Savić | Thriller | |
| Mi nismo anđeli 2 We Are Not Angels 2 | Srđan Dragojević | Nikola Kojo, Mirka Vasiljević, Goran Jevtić, Srđan Žika Todorović | Teenage comedy | Sequel to Mi nismo anđeli We Are Not Angels |
| Stvar srca Heart's Affair | Miroslav Aleksić | Vuk Kostić | Drama/Romance | |
| Potraga za sreć(k)om | Milorad Milinković | | Comedy | |
| Zvezde ljubavi | Milan Spasić | | Drama/Comedy/Romance | |
2006
| A3 - Rock'n'roll uzvraća udarac We Are Not Angels 3- Rock&Roll Strike Back | Petar Pašić | Zlatko Rakonjac, Nikola Pejaković, Srđan Žika Todorović | Teenage comedy | Another sequel to Mi nismo anđeli We Are Not Angels |
| Aporia | Aris Movsesijan | | Drama | |
| Guča; Gucha-Distant Trumpet | Dušan Milić | Marko Marković, Mladen Nelević, Olga Odanović | Drama/Comedy/Musical | |
| Krojačeva tajna | Miloš Avramović | Goran Šušljik, Dragan Mićanović, Lazar Ristovski | Drama/Horror/Thriller | |
| Optimisti; The Optimists | Goran Paskaljević | Lazar Ristovski, Mira Banjac, Viktor Savić, Petar Božović, Slavko Štimac | Drama/Comedy | |
| Sedam i po Seven and a Half | Miroslav Momčilović | Nikola Đuričko, Mira Stupica, Milan Gutović, Gordan Kičić, Boris Komnenić, Branko Bane Vidaković | Comedy | |
| Sinovci | Siniša Kovačević | Petar Kralj, Ljiljana Blagojević, Kalina Kovačević | Drama | |
| Sutra ujutru Tomorrow Morning | Oleg Novković | Nada Šargin, Uliks Fehmiju | Drama | |
| Šejtanov ratnik | Stevan Filipović | Petar Božović, Branko Bane Vidaković, Svetlana Bojković, Branislav Lečić | Comedy/Horror | |
| Uslovna sloboda | Miroslav Živanović | Milan Gutović, Ivana Mihić | Comedy/Thriller | |
2007
| Agi i Ema; Agi and Ema | Milutin Petrović | Milena Dravić, Stefan Lazarević, Ana Sofrenović, Dragan Mićanović | Family | |
| Crni Gruja i Kamen Mudrosti; Black Gruya and the Stone of Wisdom | Marko Marinković | Nenad Jezdić, Boris Milivojević, Marinko Madžgalj | Comedy | Based on characters from "Crni gruja" TV series |
| Četvrti čovek The Fourth Man | Dejan Zečević | Nikola Kojo, Marija Karan, Dragan Petrović, Bogdan Diklić, Dragan Nikolić | Action/Thriller | |
| Hadersfild; Huddersfield | Ivan Živković | Nebojša Glogovac, Goran Šušljik, Vojin Ćetković, Jelisaveta Seka Sablić | Drama | Based on theater play |
| Hamlet, Ciganski Princ; Hamlet | Aleksandar Rajković | | Drama | |
| Klopka; The Trap | Srdan Golubović | Nebojša Glogovac, Nataša Ninković, Anica Dobra, Predrag Miki Manojlović | Drama/Thriller | |
| Konji Vrani; Black Horses | Ljubiša Samardžić | Kalina Kovačević, Ljubiša Samardžić, Renata Ulmanski | Drama | Sequel to "Jesen stiže dunjo moja" |
| Odbačen; The Reject | Miloš Radivojević | Svetozar Cvetković | Drama | |
| Peščanik; Sand Glass | Sabolč Tolnai | Slobodan Ćustić | Drama | Based on novels by Danilo Kiš |
| Promeni me Change Me | Milan Karadžić | Milutin Mima Kardžić, Dara Džokić, Neda Arnerić, Dragan Nikolić | Comedy | |
| S.O.S. - Spasite Naše Duše; Save our Souls | Slobodan Šijan | Neda Arnerić, Katarina Radivojević, Vuk Kostić, Slavko Štimac, Dragan Bjelogrlić, Lazar Ristovski, Bogdan Diklić | Comedy | |
| Zavet; Promise Me This | Emir Kusturica | Aleksandar Berček, Ljiljana Blagojević | Drama | Entered into the 2007 Cannes Film Festival |
| Dva; Two | Puriša Đorđević | Dragan Mićanović, Dragan Jovanović | Drama | |
| Princ od papira Paper prince | Marko Kostić | Milica Spasojević, Stefan Lazarević | Drama | |
| Kenedi se ženi Kenedi is getting married | Želimir Žilnik | Kande Hasani, Salji Hasani | Drama | |
2008
| Čarlston za Ognjenku; Charleston & Vendetta | Uroš Stojanović | Sonja Kolačarić, Katarina Radivojević, Olivera Katarina, Stefan Kapičić, Nenad Jezdić | Comedy/Fantasy | |
| Čitulja za Eskobara | Milorad Milinković | | Comedy | |
| Ljubav i Drugi Zločini; Love and Other Crimes | Stefan Arsenijević | Anica Dobra, Vuk Kostić | Drama/Romance | |
| Miloš Branković; Milos Brankovic | Nebojša Radosavljević | Nada Šargin, Miloš Vlalukin, Jovana Stipić | | |
| Jelenin svet Jelena's World | Tatjana Brzaković | Jelena Janković | Documentary | |
| Biro za izgubljene stvari | Svetislav Bata Prelić | | | |
| Na Lepom Plavom Dunavu; On the Beautiful Blue Danube | Darko Bajić | Branislav Lečić, Bojana Maljević, Ana Franić | Comedy | |
| The Tour; Turneja | Goran Marković | Dragan Nikolić, Mira Furlan, Jelena Đokić, Gordan Kičić, Tihomir Stanić | War/Black Comedy | |
| Bledi mesec Pale moon | Ljubiša Samardžić | Milan Vasić, Marta Uzelac, Kalina Kovačević | Drama, Romance | |
2009
| Drug Crni u Narodnooslobodilačkoj borbi Comrade Black in WWII | Rade Marković | Nenad Jezdić, Boris Milivojević, Marinko Madžgalj, Nikola Kojo, Dragan Jovanović | Comedy/War | |
| Zona Mrtvih; Zone of the Dead | Milan Konjević and Milan Todorović | Ken Foree, Kristina Klebe, Emilio Roso | Horror | |
| Zabranjena ljubav The Forbidden Love | Momčilo Preradović | Milan Veljković, Sandra Janković, David Dulić, Sonja Savić | Drama | |
| Beogradski fantom The Belgrade Phantom | Jovan B. Todorović | Milutin Milošević, Radoslav Milenković, Marko Živić, Miloš Vlalukin, Nada Macanković | Historical/Drama/Thriller/Documentary film | This film is based on a true story about events in Belgrade in 1979. |
| Jesen u mojoj ulici Autmn on My Street | Miloš Pušić | Filip Đurić, Nikola Spasojević, Milica Trifunović, Nada Dobanović, Nikola Ilić | Comedy/Youth drama | |
| Besa; Solemn Promise | Srđan Karanović | Miki Manojlović, Iva Krajnc, Radivoje Bukvić | Drama/Romance film | |
| Đavolja varoš Devil's Town | Vladimir Paskaljević | Lazar Ristovski; Danica Ristovski; Marija Zeljković; Mina Čolić | Drama; Comedy | |
| Ordinary People | Vladimir Perišić | Relja Popović, Boris Isaković, Miroslav Stevanović | War film | |
| Život i smrt porno bande The Life and Death of a Porno Gang | Mladen Đorđević | Mihajlo Jovanović; Ana Aćimović; Predrag Damnjanović; Radivoj Knežević | Drama; Horror; Adventure | |
| Čekaj me, ja sigurno neću doći Wait for Me and I Will Not Come | Miroslav Momčilović | Miloš Samolov; Mirjana Karanović; Gordan Kičić; Milica Mihajlović | Drama; Romance | |
| Hitna pomoć The Ambulance | Goran Radovanović | Vesna Trivalić; Nenad Jezdić; Nataša Ninković; Sonja Kolačarić | Drama | |
| Technotise - Edit i ja Technotise: Edit & I | Aleksa Gajić; Nebojša Andrić; Stevan Đorđević | Sanda Knežević; Igor Bugarski; Tatjana Đorđević; Nikola Đuričko | Animation | An animation feature set in Belgrade in year 2074. |
| Tamo i ovde Here and There | Darko Lungulov | David Thornton; Bane Trifunović; Cyndi Lauper; Mirjana Karanović | Drama; Comedy | |
| Medeni mesec Honeymoons | Goran Paskaljević | Nebojša Milovanović; Jelena Trkulja; Jozef Shiroka; Mirela Naska | Drama | |
| Stara škola kapitalizma The Old School of Capitalism | Želimir Žilnik | Živojin Popgligorin; Lazar Stojanović; Branimir Stojanović; Zoran Paroški | Drama; Documentary | |
| Sveti Georgije ubiva aždahu Saint George Shoots the Dragon | Srđan Dragojević | Dušan Kovačević; Lazar Ristovski; Srđan Dragojević; Milko Josifov; Biljana Prvanović | Historical/Drama | Story about life in a Serbian village during the First World War. |
| Neko me ipak čeka Someone is still waiting | Marko Novaković | Vesna Trivalić; Anica Dobra; Desanka Stojanović; Mirjana Koranović | Drama | |
| Srce je mudrih u kući žalosti The heart of the wise lives in the house of sorrow | Marin Malešević | Milivoje Obradović; Aleksandar Đurica; Strahinja Bojoviić | Drama, Mystery | |

== 2010s ==
| Title | Director | Cast | Genre | Notes |
|---|---|---|---|---|
2010
| Srpski film A Serbian Film | Srđan Spasojević | Srđan Todorović, Sergej Trifunović | Horror / Thriller | It tells the experience of a down-on-his-luck porn star who agrees to participate in an "art film", only to discover that he has been drafted into a snuff movie. Controversial film with explicit material. |
| Šišanje; Skinning | Stefan Filipović | Nikola Rakočević, Viktor Savić, Bojana Novaković | Drama | It tells the story of a young math wiz Novica falling in with the wrong crowd and transforming into a racist, nationalistic, murderous skinhead. |
| Tilva Roš; Tilva Roš | Nikola Ležaić | Marko Todorović, Stefan Đorđević | Coming-of-age / Drama | Story about Toda and Stefan two friends friends, skaters, who spend their first summer after finishing high school. Stefan's going to Belgrade to the university in fall while Toda stays back home. They spend time shooting "Jackass-like" videos and hanging out with Dunja, who came back from France for her holidays, and get into a quiet battle for her attention. In that strange relationship of dying friendship and rivalry they try to get ahead of each other. |
| Plavi voz Blue Train | Janko Baljak | Ljubomir Bulajić; Sanja Popović; Nebojsa Milovanović; Aleksandar Radojičić | Drama | |
| Ma nije on takav That's Not What He's Like | Miroslav Petković | Dragan Bjelogrlić; Gordan Kičić; Zoran Cvijanović; Branka Pujić | Thriller | |
| Žena sa slomljenim nosem The Woman with a Broken Nose | Srđan Koljević | Nebojša Glogovac; Anica Dobra; Branka Katić; Jasna Žalica | Drama / Comedy / Romance | |
| Kao rani mraz An Early Frost | Ðorđe Balašević | Marko Makivić; Predrag Bjelac; Aleksa Balašević; Daniel Kovačević | Drama / Comedy / Historical | Dramatized story of Vasa Ladački, inspired by the famous Balašević song. |
| Flešbek; Flashback | Aleksandar Janković | Dušan Premović; Branko Vidaković; Vladislava Milosavljević; Darja Janošević | Drama | |
| Motel Nana; Motel Nana | Predrag Velinović | Dragan Mićanović; Nikolina Đorđević; Zijah Sokolović; Branko Sančanin | Drama | |
| Beli, beli svet White White World | Oleg Novković | Jasna Đuričić; Uliks Fehmiu; Hana Selimović; Mira Banjac | Drama | |
| Montevideo, Bog te video Montevideo, God Bless You! | Dragan Bjelogrlić | Miloš Biković, Petar Strugar, Predrag Vasić | Historical / Adventure / Drama | About the events leading to the participation of the Yugoslavia national football team in the first FIFA World Cup in Montevideo, Uruguay in July 1930. The film has gained considerable media attention throughout 2010 and is achieving significant box office success in Serbia since its release. |
| Ako zno ne umre | Sinisa Dragin | Mustafa Nadarević; Dan Condurache; Franc Buhrizer | Comedy, Drama | Serbian co-production |
2011
| Neprijatelj; The Enemy | Dejan Zečević | Aleksandar Stojković; Vuk Kostić; Tihomir Stanić; Ljubomir Bandović | Drama / Horror / Thriller | Post-war story |
| Beli lavovi White Lions | Lazar Ristovski | Lazar Ristovski; Gordan Kičić; Hristina Popović; Vuk Kostić | Comedy | Working-class comedy about a disgruntled Serbian factory worker taking matters into his own hands. |
| Oktobar; Oktobar | Senka Domanović; Ognjen Glavonić; Ognjen Isailović; Dane Komljen; Ivan Pecikoza; Damir Romanov; Milica Tomović | Nikola Rakočević, Milica Grujičić | Drama | Seven-segment drama. |
| Zduhač znači avantura Zduhač Means Adventure | Milorad Milinković | Zlatan Vidović; Vujadin Milošević; Jelisaveta Orašanin; Katarina Ilić | Comedy | |
| Sestre; The Sisters | Vladimir Paskaljević | Ivana Vuković; Ana Mandić; Ljubomir Bandović; Milena Predić | Crime / Drama / Romance | |
| Zajedno (film); Together | Mladen Matičević | Aleksandar "Kubura" Srećković; Milica Zarić; Branimir Popović; Gordan Kičić | Crime / Drama | |
| Kako su me ukrali Nemci; How I Was Stolen by the Germans | Miša Radivojević | Jelena Đokić; Douglas Henshall; Svetozar Cvetković; Dara Džokić | Drama / War | Story inspired by the director Miša Radivojević's childhood. |
| Zlatna levica, priča o Radivoju Koraću; The Golden Left Hand: The Radivoj Korać Story | Gordan Matić | Vladimir Aleksić; Vojislav Brajović; Tamara Krcunović; Tamara Maksimović | Biopic / Documentary | The life of basketball legend Radivoj Korać presented partly as dramatized story and partly as a documentary narrated by basketball players Saša Đorđević and Milenko Topić featuring Korać's contemporaries from the 1960s |
| O Gringo; O Gringo | Darko Bajić | Dejan Petković | Documentary | |
| The Box; The Box | Andrijana Stojković | Ivan Đorđević; Marko Janketić; Slobodan Negić; Goran Radaković | Drama | |
| Parada; The Parade | Srđan Dragojević | Nikola Kojo; Miloš Samolov; Hristina Popović; Goran Jevtić | Comedy | Dramatization of a Gay-Pride Parade in Belgrade, Serbia and the events leading up to it. |
| Praktičan vodič kroz Beograd sa pevanjem i plakanjem Practical Guide to Belgrade with Singing and Crying | Bojan Vuletić | Marko Janketić; Julie Gayet; Anita Mančić; Jean-Marc Barr | Comedy / Drama / Romance | |
| The Scent of Rain in the Balkans; Miris kiše na Balkanu | Ljubiša Samardžić | Mirka Vasiljević | Drama, Romance | |
2012
| Klip; Clip | Maja Miloš | Isidora Simijonovic; Vukašin Jasnić; Sanja Mikitisin; Jovo Maksić | Drama | Sixteen-year-old Jasna lives with her mother, seriously ill father, and younger sister. Most of her time, perhaps as a way of dealing with her father's illness, is spent taking sexy photos of herself with her mobile phone, getting drunk with her friends and pursuing 18-year-old Đole. She soon starts a relationship of sorts with him, which mainly involves her submitting to his every sexual whim and filming all of it with a mobile phone camera. |
| Šešir profesora Vujića; Professor Kosta Vujic's Hat | Zdravko Šotra | Aleksandar Berček; Miloš Biković; Ivan Bosiljčić; Andrija Daničić | Drama / Comedy | The story of professor Kosta Vujić who in the mid-19th century taught an extraordinarily talented generation of gymnasium students, some of whom would go on to become prominent members of the Serbian society and eventually historically significant figures. They include Mihailo "Mika Alas" Petrović, Stevan Stojanović Mokranjac, Jovan Cvijić, and Jaša Prodanović. |
| Doktor Rej i đavoli Doctor Ray and the Devils | Dinko Tucaković | Paul Leonard Murray; Dragan Bjelogrlić; Ana Sofrenović; Lena Bogdanović | Biopic | The story behind and around famous American director Nicholas Ray's 1960s stay in SFR Yugoslavia. The celebrated director who was the toast of Hollywood only a decade earlier having made Rebel Without a Cause has fallen on hard times and is now desperately trying to re-establish his spiraling film career. On the other hand, his powerful host, Avala Film director and former Yugoslav secret service operative Ratko Dražević, is dreaming big dreams - he is trying to establish a 'Hollywood behind the Iron Curtain' of sorts. |
| Ustanička ulica Ustanička Street | Miroslav Terzić | Gordan Kičić; Uliks Fehmiu; Rade Šerbedžija; Marko Baćović | Drama / Thriller | An employee at the Serbian state prosecutor's office gets a top secret case. |
| Crna Zorica; Loveless Zoritsa | Hristina Hatziharalabous; Radoslav Pavković | Bane Trifunović; Ljuma Penov; Mirjana Karanović; Nikola Pejaković | Comedy | The story takes place in modern-day Eastern Serbia, still fertile ground for various forms of superstition and prejudice. Zorica is a village girl who carries a curse. Ever since her first boyriend mysteriously drowned in the river, men around her are dying in most bizarre ways. The plot thickens when stubborn policeman Maane who doesn't believe in 'village tales' tries to investigate whether Zorica is a serial killer or a girl looking for love. |
| Smrt čoveka na Balkanu; Death of a Man in the Balkans | Miroslav Momčilović | Emir Hadžihafizbegović; Radoslav Milenković; Nataša Ninković; Anita Mančić | Comedy / Drama | |
| Led; Ice | Jelena Bajić-Jočić | Bata Živojinović; Momčilo Otašević; Radoš Bajić; Emir Hadžihafizbegović | Drama | The plot revolves around the 1970s social change in rural Serbia that brought about the dramatic process of financial class differentiation and destruction of Serbian villages. |
| Kad svane dan When the Day Breaks | Goran Paskaljević | Mustafa Nadarević; Mira Banjac; Zafir Hadžimanov; Predrag Ejdus | Drama | The story of World War II Nazi concentration camp Staro Sajmište. |
| Vir; The Whirl | Bojan Vuk Kosovčević | Nebojša Đorđević; Srđan Pantelić; Nenad Okanović; Emir Kusturica | Drama / Mystery | Three stories independent of each other, tied together only by a common theme of exploring the consequences of the Serbian 1990s. The first story is about the leader of FK Rad football firm. The second one is about the leading figures in the Serbian crime underworld. and the third one is about an artist named Grof who comes back from the war front lines with psychological problems. |
| Jelena, Katarina, Marija; Jelena, Katarina, Marija | Nikita Milivojević | Borka Tomović; Jelena Stupljanin; Milica Zarić; L. Jay Meyer | Drama | Three Serbian girls in their late 20s, each with her own set of problems, live as recent immigrants in New York City. |
| Topli zec Topli zec | Goran Vukčević | Miljan Prljeta; Bata Živojinović; Ana Sakić; Mira Banjac | Comedy | |
| Sistem; System | Momčilo Preradović | Milan Veljković; Miloš Vlalukin; Nenad Nenadović; Nebojša Ljubišić | Comedy | Semestar and Kvartal are buddies from the neighbourhood trying to make money in order to change their directionless lives. To that end, they stumble upon a pyramid scheme business scam thus entering a series of bizarre situations. |
| Zverinjak | | Nikola Ristanovski; Miodrag Krstović; Tanasije Uzunoviić; Mladen Sovilj | Crime, Drama, Family | |
| Artiljero; Artilheiro | Srđa Anđelić | Jovan Kolarić; Ana Konjović; Nebojša Glogovac | Drama | |
2013
| Krugovi; Circles | Srdan Golubović | Aleksandar Berček; Nebojša Glogovac; Vuk Kostić; Emir Hadžihafizbegović | Drama | The film inspired by the true story of Bosnian Serb soldier Srđan Aleksić who died protecting Bosnian Muslim civilian Alen Glavović in January 1993 in Trebinje during the Bosnian War. Three stories take place in parallel in Belgrade, Germany, and Trebinje. Nebojsa who witnessed the death of his best friend overcomes his guilty conscience to confront the killer. Haris who owes his life to the person who sacrificed for him risks everything in order to return the favour. The murderer's son meets the fallen hero's father thus opening the way to overcoming the past. |
| Falsifikator; The Counterfeiter | Goran Marković | Branka Katić; Goran Navojec; Sergej Trifunović; Emir Hadžihafizbegović | Comedy / Drama | Black comedy about a man who turns to counterfeiting and whose personal moral descent happens simultaneously with the demise of SFR Yugoslavia. |
| Mamarosh; Mamarosh | Momčilo Mrdaković | Bogdan Diklić; Mira Banjac; Sergej Trifunović; Miloš Samolov | Comedy | |
| Vojna akademija 2 | Dejan Zečević | Radovan Vujović; Bojan Perić; Ivan Mihailović | Drama | |
| Ljubav dolazi kasnije Love comes after | Hadži Aleksandar Đurović | Milica Stefanović; Andrej Šepetovski; Goran Jevtić | Romance, Drama | |
| S/Kidanje; Trolling | Kosta Djordjevic | Marko Janketic; Dragana Dabović; Nikola Rakočević | Comedy, Drama, Romance | |
| Država; State | Jelena Markovic | Amra Latific; Jelena Marković; Ljuma Penov | Thriller | |
| Odumiranje withering | Milos Pusic | Branislav Trifunovic; Boris Isakovic; Dara Džokić | Drama | |
2014
| Kad ljubav zakasni | Ivan Stefanović | Miloš Biković; Brankica Sebastijanović | Drama | |
| Montevideo, vidimo se! See You in Montevideo | Dragan Bjelogrlić | Miloš Biković; Petar Strugar; Predrag Vasić; Viktor Savić | Drama | |
| Neposlušni | Mina Đukić | Hana Selimović; Mladen Sovilj; Danijel Sike; Minja Subota | Drama | |
| Mali Budo | Danilo Bećković | Petar Strugar; Sergej Trifunović; Tihomir Stanić; Petar Božović; Slobodan Ćustić; Aleksandra Janković | Black comedy | |
| Top je bio vreo | Slobodan Skerlić | Stanislav Ručnov; Anita Mančić; Bojana Maljević; Slavko Štimac; Mira Banjac | Anti-war melodrama | |
| Mamula | Milan Todorović | Kristina Klebe; Natalie Burn; Dragan Mićanović; Slobodan Stefanović; Franco Nero | Horror | |
| Atomski zdesna | Srđan Dragojević | Srđan Todorović; Tanja Ribič; Bojan Navojec; Zoran Cvijanović; Milutin Karadžić | Drama | |
| Čudna šuma | Szabolcs Tolnai | Hermina Erdélyi; Robert Tilly; Nenad Jezdić | Drama | Cooproduction of Serbia and Hungary |
| Varvari | Ivan Ikić | Željko Marković; Nenad Petrović; Jasna Đuričić; Marina Vodeničar; Mirko Vlahović | Drama | |
| Spomenik Majklu Džeksonu | Darko Lungulov | Boris Milivojević; Dragan Bjelogrlić; Nataša Tapušković; Branislav Trifunović; Mirjana Karanović | Comedy | |
| Travelator | Dušan Milić | Nikola Rakočević; Boris Isaković; Khetanya Henderson; Jack Dimich | Comedy | |
| No One's Child (Ničije dete) | Vuk Ršumović | Denis Murić; Pavle Čemerikić; Isidora Janković; Miloš Timotijević; Tihomir Stanić | Drama | |
| Sizif K. | Filip Gajić | Bojan Dimitrijević; Lucija Šerbedžija; Goran Jevtić; Hana Selimović; Maja Pikić | Historical drama | |
| Branio sam Mladu Bosnu | Srđan Koljević | Nikola Rakočević; Vuk Kostić; Nebojša Glogovac | Historical drama | |
| Isceljenje | Ivan Jović | Jovo Maksić; Radovan Miljanić; Nemanja Jeremić | Drama | |
| Peti leptir | Milorad Milinković | Mihailo Janketić; Ognjen Orešković; Tanja Bošković; Marko Nikolić | Fantasy | First Serbian movie filmed in 3D technology. |
| Jednaki; Equals | Mladen Djordjevic; Dejan Karaklajić; Darko Lungulov | Mihailo Janketić; Nela Mihajlović; Marko Nikolić; Nataša Askentijević | Drama | |
| Tmina; Blackness | Luka Bursać | Vladimir Gvojić; Miljana Popović | Drama, Sci-Fi | |
2015
| Unutra; Inside | Mirko Abrlić; Jelena Marković | Alexander Milisaljević; George Erčević; Ivan Nikolić | Drama | |
| Enklava; Enclave | Goran Radovanović | Filip Šubarić, Denis Murić, Nebojša Glogovac, Anica Dobra | Drama | |
| Gorcilo - Jesi li to dosao da me vidis | Mima Karadžić | Mima Karadžić; Boro Stjepanović; Mladen Nelević | Comedy | |
| Otvoreni kavez Open cage | Siniša Galić | Leni Wesselman; Jelena Rakočević; Nenad Okanović | Drama | |
| Bićemo prvaci sveta We will be world champions | Darko Bajić | Strahinja Blažić; Aleksandar Radojičić; Miloš Biković | Biography, Drama, Family | |
| Petlja; Loop | Milutin Petrović | Daniel Kovac; Amra Latific; Marina Marković | Mystery | |
| Žigosana; Marked | Saša Radojević | Andrijana Đorđević; Jelena Susnjar; Amra Latifić | Drama | |
| Unutra; Inside | Mirko Abrlić; Jelena Marković | Aleksandar Milisavljevic; Djordje Ercevic; Ivan Nikolic | Drama | |
| For King and Homeland; Za kralja i otadžbinu | Radoš Bajić; Marko Nikolić | Nenad Okanović; Neda Arnerić | History, Drama | |
| Panama | Pavle Vučković; Slaven Došlo | Jovana Stojiljković; Miloš Pjevac | Drama, Romance, Thriller | |
| Psiho-seansa | Danko Stojić; Marica Vuletić | Miloš Milić; Milica Petrović | Drama | |
| Pored mene Next to me | Stevan Filipović | Hristina Popović; Slaven Došlo; Nikola Glišić | Comedy, Drama | |
| Bez stepenika | Marko Novaković | Vlastimir Đuza Stojiljković; Nataša Ninković | Drama | |
| Amanet; Next to me | Nemanja Ćipranić | Ljubomir Bulajić; Milena Živanović; Danica Maksimoviić | Drama, Thriller | |
| Otadžbina; Fatherland | Oleg Novković | Nada Šargin; Vuk Kostić; Marta Bjelica | Drama | |
| Igra u tami Darkness | Jug Radivojević | Tamara Dragičević; Viktor Savić; Vuk Kostić | Drama | |
| Smrdljiva bajka A stinking fairytale | Miroslav Momčilović | Žarko Laušević; Jelena Đokić; Petar Božović | Drama | |
| Porodica; Family | Saša Radojević | Ana Stefanović; Marina Marković; Aleksandra Nikolić | Drama | |
| Sizif K. Sisyphus K. | Filip Gajić | Bojan Dimitrijević; Rambo Amadeus; Lucija Šerbedžija | Drama, Mystery | |
2016
| Dobra žena A Good Wife | Mirjana Karanović | Mirjana Karanović, Boris Isaković, Hristina Popović, Bojan Navojec | Drama | |
| Vlažnost; Humidity | Nikola Ljuca | Slaven Došlo, Miloš Timotijević, Tamara Krcunović, Marija Krakman | Drama/Mystery | |
| Jesen samuraja The Samurai in Autumn | Danilo Bećković | Hristina Popović, Petar Strugar, Nikola Kojo | Comedy/Drama | |
| Na mlecnom putu On the Milky Road | Emir Kusturica | Emir Kusturica, Monica Bellucci, Sloboda Mićalović | Comedy/Drama/Fantasy | |
| Dnevnik Mašinovođe; Train Driver's Diary | Miloš Radović | Lazar Ristovski, Petar Korać | Comedy | |
| Paluba ispod Terazija; Signature work | Dejan Vlaisavljević Nikt | Marija Sević, Dejan Vasiljević, Nebojša Pajjkić | Crime, Thriller | |
| Apofenija | Marin Malešević | Aleksandar Đurica, Ljubomir Bandović, Boris Komnenić | Drama | |
| Otvorena; Open wound | Momir Milošević | Milena Đurović, Jelena Pužić, Jelena Angelovski | Drama, Horror | |
| Procep; The Rift: Dark Side of the Moon | Dejan Zečević | Ken Foree, Katarina Cas, Monte Markham | Horror, Sci-Fi, Thriller | |
| Braća po babine linije Double trouble | Radoš Bajić | Radoš Bajić, Milorad Mandić | Comedy | |
| Inkarnacija; Incarnation | Filip Kovacevic | Stojan Đorđević, Dača Vidosavljević | Action, Mystery | |
| Ona je živa She is alive | Strahinja Mlađenović | Suzana Vuković, Minja Peković | Drama, Horror | |
| Svi severni gradovi All the cities of the North | Dane Komljen | Boban Kaludjer, Boris Isaković, Dane Komljen | Drama | |
| Sporazum; Agreement | Predrag Radonjić | Bora Nenić, Vasilije Kokotović | Drama | |
| Ime: Dobrica, prezime: nepoznato Name: Dobrica, Last Name: Unknown | Srđa Penezić | Slavko Štimac, Hana Selimović | Comedy, Drama | |
| Zemlja bogova Dev Bhoomi - Land of the Gods | Goran Paskaljević | Victor Banerjee, Geetanjali Thapa | Drama | |
| Vojna akademija 3: Novi početak Military Academy 3 | Dejan Zečević (uncredited) | Bojan Perić, Branko Janković] | Drama | |
| Vetar; Wind | Tamara Drakulić | Tamara Stajić, Eroll Bilibani | Drama | |
| Stado; Herd | Nikola Kojo | Nikola Kojo, Vesna Trivalić | Comedy | |
| Santa Maria della Salute | Zdravko Šotra | Vojin Ćetković, Tamara Aleksić | Biography, Drama | |
2017
| Rekvijem za gospodju J. Requiem for Mrs. J. | Bojan Vuletić | Mirjana Karanović, Jovana Gavrilović, Danica Nedeljković, Vučić Perović, Mira Banjac | Comedy | |
| Horizonti; Horizons | Svetislav Dragomirović | Gojko Baletić, Jovana Gavrilović, Slobodan Beštić, Stefan Bundalo | Drama/Thriller | |
| Kozje uši Goat ears | Marko Kostić | Gorica Popović, Nikola Kojo, Milica Spasojevic | Comedy, Drama | |
| Saga o 3 nevina muškarca 3 virgins | Shridhar | Momcilo Otasevic, Slavko Sobin, Ljubomir Bulajić | Comedy | |
| Zona Zamfirova 2 | Jug Radivojević | Brankica Sebastijanovic, Milan Vasic, Ljiljana Stjepanovic | Drama, Romance | |
| Biser Bojane; Diamond of Bojana | Mima Karadžić | Slaven Došlo, Mima Karadžić, Vanja Nenadić | Action, Comedy | |
| Povratak | Predrag Jakšić | Lazar Rockwood, Nick Mancuso, Dubravka Mijatović | Drama, Thriller | |
| A Stowaway on the Ship of Fools; Slepi putnik na brodu ludaka | Goran Marković | Igor Đorđević, Tihomir Stanić, Aleksandar Đurica | Biography, Drama | |
| Nasi ocevi, majke i njihova djeca | Sanja Savić | Rade Ćosić, Dragan Jovanović, Nikola Šurbanović | Comedy, Drama | |
| Afterparti | Luka Bursać | Ljubo Božović, Ljubica Čvoro, Veljko Đoković | Drama | |
| Snevani snegovi Álom hava | Zolatan Bičkei | Nandor Silađi, Miklos Sekelj | Drama | Hungarian-Serbian co-production |
| Nigdei; Nowhere | Predrag Velinović | Nebojša Milovanović, Marija Bergman, Miloš Samolov | Drama | |
| Horizonti; Horizons | Svetislav Dragomirović | Gojko Baletić, Jovan Gavrilović, Slobodan Beštić | Action, Comedy | |
2018
| Kralj Petar I King Peter The First | Petar Ristovski | Lazar Ristovski, Milan Kolak, Danica Ristovski, Ivan Vujić | Drama/History/War | |
| Izgrednici; Offenders | Dejan Zečević | Radovan Vujović, Mladen Sovilj, Marta Bjelica, Svetozar Cvetković | Drama | |
| O bubicama i herojima About Bugs and Heroes | Petar Pašić | Slobodan Ninković, Bojan Dimitrijević, Zoran Cvijanović | Drama | |
| Južni vetar South Wind | Milos Avramovic | Milos Bikovic, Miodrag Radonjic, Dragan Bjelogrlic, Nebojsa Glogovac | Crime/Drama/Thriller | |
| Ederlezi Rising; A.I. Rising | Lazar Bodroža | Sebastian Cavazza, Stoya, Marusa Majer, Kristy Besterman | Drama/Romance/Sci-Fi | |
| The Load | Ognjen Glavonić | Leon Lučev, Pavle Čemerikić | War drama | |
| The witch hunters Zlogonje | Raško Miljković | Mihajlo Milavić, Silma Mahmuti | Adventure, Drama, Family | |
| Banditi u potrazi za mamom Bandits in Search of Mom | Kosta Ristić | Kristijan Garip, Edin Arifi, Sunita Garip, Emran Garip | Drama/Coming of age | |
2019
| Taksi bluz Taxi Blues | Miroslav Stamatov | Andrija Milošević, Milena Predić, Todor Jovanović, Aleksandra Tomić | Comedy/Romance | |
| Balkanska međa The Balkan Line | Andrey Volgin | Anton Pampushnyy, Milena Radulović, Yuriy Kutsenko, Miloš Biković | Action/War | |
| Vojna akademija 5 Military Academy 5 | Dejan Zečević | Bojan Perić, Nina Janković, Jelisaveta Orašanin, Miloš Timotijević | Coming of age/Drama | |
| Ekipa; The Team | Marko Šopić | Rade Ćosić, Andrija Milošević, Dragan Jovanović, Srđan Todorović | Comedy/Crime/Sport | |
| Realna priča The Real Story | Gordan Kičić | Gordan Kičić, Nina Janković, Nebojša Ilić, Branimir Brstina | Comedy | |
| Ajvar | Ana Maria Rossi | Nataša Ninković, Sergej Trifunović, Vesna Čipčić | Drama | |
| Šavovi; Stitches | Miroslav Terzić | Snežana Bogdanović, Marko Baćović, Jovana Stojiljković, Vesna Trivalić | Drama Thriller | |
| 4 ruže 4 roses | Vasilije Nikitović | Miloš Samolov, Dragan Jovanović, Boris Milivojević | Crime, Drama | |
| Asimetrija; Asymmetry | Maša Neškoviić | Daria Lorenci, Uliks Fehmiu, Mira Janjatović | Drama | |
| Moj jutarnji smeh My Morning Laughter | Marko Djordjevic | Filip Djuric, Ivana Vukovic, Jasna Djuricic | Comedy, Drama | |
| Revolt | Aleksandar Rajković | Ana Sofrenović; Svetozar Cvetković; Dušan Janićijević; Dara Džokić | Drama | A group of young people in Belgrade are revolting against the system. |

== 2020s ==
| Title | Director | Cast | Genre | Notes |
|---|---|---|---|---|
2020
| Vikend sa ćaletom | Miroslav Momčilović | Nenad Jezdić, Vasa Vraneš, Branko Vidaković | Drama | |
| Živ čovek | Oleg Novković | Nikola Ðuričko, Nada Šargin | Drama | |
| Ime naroda The name of the people | Đorđe Bajić | Ljubomir Bandović, Anja Pavićević, Katarina Žutiić | History, Drama | |
| Father; Otac | Srđan Golubović | Goran Bogdan, Boris Isaković, Nada Šargin | History, Drama | |
| Oasis; Oaza | Ivan Ikić | Goran Bogdan, Mrusa Majer, Marijana Novakov | Drama | |
2021
| Dara of Jasenovac; Dara iz Jasenovca | Predrag Antonijević | Biljana Čekić, Vuk Kostić, Igor Đorđević | History, Drama | |
| Nebesa; Heavens above | Srđan Dragojević | Goran Navojec, Ksenija Marinković, Nataša Marković | Comedy, Fantasy | |
| Jedini izlaz The only way out | Darko Nikolić | Anđelka Prpić, Vladimir Aleksić, Ljubomir Bandović | Thriller | |
| Impure Blood: The Ancestral Sin; Nečista krv: Greh predaka | Milutin Petrović | Dragan Bjelogrlić, Marko Grabež, Nedim Nezirović, Nela Mihailović | Drama | |
| Heroes of the Working Class; Heroji radničke klase | Miloš Pušić | Boris Isaković, Jasna Đuričić, Stefan Beronja | Drama | |
| South Wind 2: Acceleration; Južni vetar 2: Ubrzanje | Miloš Avarmović | Miloš Biković, Miodrag Radonjić, Miki Manojlović, Jovana Stojiljković | Chrime/Triller | |
| The Celts; Kelti | Milica Tomović | Dubravka Kovjanić, Stefan Trifunović, Nikola Rakočević | Drama | |
| Usury; Lihvar | Nemanja Ćeranić | Dušan Petković, Strahinja Blažić, Milica Grujičić, Branko Vidaković | Crime/Drama | |
| The Dark; Mrak | Dušan Milić | Danica Čurčić, Slavko Štimac, Miona Ilov | Drama | |
| Heaven; Nebesa | Srđan Dragojević | Goran Navojec, Ksenija Marinković, Nataša Marković | Comedy/Drama/Fantasy | |
| Nije loše biti čovek | Dušan Kovačević | Vojin Ćetković, Srđan Todorović, Gordan Kičić | Comedy/Drama | |
| Strahinja Banović | Stefan Arsenijević | Ibrahim Koma, Nancy Mensah-Offei, Maxim Khalil | Drama | |
| Toma | Zoran Lisinac | Milan Marić, Srđan Todorović, Mrijana Karanović | Drama | |
| Golden boy Zlatni dečko | Ognjen Janković | Denis Murić, Ljubomir Bulajić, Tihomir Stanić | Biography | |
| Živ čovek | Oleg Novković | Nikola Đuričko, Jana Bjelica, Marta Bjelica | Comedy | |
2024
| 78 Days; 78 dana | Emilija Gašić | Milica Gicić, Tamara Gajović, Viktorija Vasiljević, Pavle Čemerikić, Goran Bogdan, Jelena Đokić | Drama | |
| Cat's Cry; Mačji krik | Sanja Živković | Jasmin Geljo, Andrijana Đorđević, Sanja Mikitišin, Marija Škaričić, Denis Murić, Sergej Trifunović, Srđan Miletić | Drama | Screenplay by Goran Paskaljević unproduced before his death in 2020 |
2025
| Pearlescent Fog; Седеф-магла | Milorad Milinković | Miloš Timotijević, Petar Strugar, Jana Ivanović, Nebojša Dugalić, Vojislav Brajović, Luka Grbić, Miona Marković, Jelena Ilić, Mariana Arandjelović, Maya Champar | Crime, Drama, Historical | |
2026
| 3 Weeks After; 3 nedelje posle | Miroslav Terzić | Jovan Ginić, Klara Hrvanović, Andjela Alavirević, Tihana Lazović, and Branislav Trifunović | Drama | |

== See also ==
- Lists of Yugoslav films
