= The Optimists (film) =

2006 film

- Promotional poster
- Directed by: Goran Paskaljević
- Written by: Goran Paskaljević; Vladimir Paskaljević
- Produced by: Goran Paskaljević; Lazar Ristovski
- Starring: Lazar Ristovski; Bojana Novakovic; Petar Božović; Nebojša Glogovac
- Cinematography: Milan Spasić
- Edited by: Petar Putniković
- Music by: Aleksandar Simić
- Production company: Nova Film
- Release date: September 11, 2006
- Running time: 98 minutes
- Country: Serbia
- Language: Serbian

The Optimists (Serbian Cyrillic: Оптимисти) is a 2006 Serbian black comedy film directed by Goran Paskaljević. The film, presented as five unrelated narrative sequences, was inspired by Voltaire's 1759 satirical novel Candide. The Optimists features an ensemble cast of Serbian actors with Lazar Ristovski appearing in all five stories.

The film premiered at the 2006 Toronto International Film Festival (TIFF) and was subsequently screened at several other film festivals, earning multiple awards. The 51st Valladolid International Film Festival named Ristovski Best Actor, and the film won the Youth Jury Award and the Golden Spike award as the best film of the festival. The Optimists was included as part of a retrospective exhibition on director Paskaljević at the Museum of Modern Art in 2008.

== Plot ==
A large flood has almost destroyed a village. A hypnotist (Ristovski) comes to the village and speaks to the destitute inhabitants. Free of charge, the hypnotist offers to lift the villagers' spirits through hypnosis. The villagers doubt the hypnotist's noble motive and accuse him of an apparent theft. The police arrest, beat, and interrogate him.

A sleazy businessman (Tihomir Arsić) takes a young female employee (Bojana Novaković) to a rural area and rapes her. The girl's father (Ristovski) is upset and wants to kill the man. Fearing that the powerful businessman will fire him, the father apologizes to the businessman instead, implying the daughter was responsible for the assault and inconvenienced the businessman.

Ilija's (Viktor Savić) father Ratomir (Ristovski) recently died. Ilija gambles away the money saved for his father's funeral. He meets an old lady (Mira Banjac) recently diagnosed with a terminal illness. She has had a lucky streak on the slot machines ever since her diagnosis. Ilija joins her in hopes of rejoicing with her success.

Pera (Ristovski), the owner of a large slaughterhouse, calls a doctor (Nebojša Glogovac) to his home complaining that his 12-year-old son (Nebojša Milovanović) is giving him a heart attack. Pera locks up his son because the 12-year-old feels overly dedicated to the family business, so much so that he slaughters every animal he sees. The doctor realizes that Pera wants him to treat the son, not the slaughterhouse owner.

A con man posing as a faith healer (Ristovski) approaches a group of people with various disabilities and illnesses. He offers, for a fee, to take them by the busload to a spring that has magical healing powers where they will be cured. The group boards the bus and arrives at the destination. Once there, the con man abandons the group and leaves the site. The group, having realized the con man has abandoned them, does not prevent the bus from leaving because they are still determined to get the full benefit of the spring's healing waters.

== Cast ==
- Lazar Ristovski as Professor Gavrilo / Simon / Pokojni Ratomir / Gazda Pera / Aleska Pantic
- Bojana Novakovic as Marina
- Petar Bozovic as Inspektor
- Tihomir Arsic as Pipovic
- Nebojsa Glogovac as Dr. Milo Petrovic
- Nebojsa Milovanovic as Bolesni Mladic
- Slavko Stimac as Otac Slepe Devojke
- Dragan Jovanovic as Golub
- Mira Banjac as Baba Kockarka
- Viktor Savic as Ilija
- Lazar Milosevic as Mali Dimitrije
- Danica Ristovski as Simonova Zena
- Vladimir Jevtovic as Ilijin Stric (credited as Vladimir Jeftovic)
- Boro Stjepanovic as Nervozni Covek
- Aleksandra Pleskonjic as Majka Bolenog Mladica
- Ivan Bekjarev as Sef Kazina
- Gordana Maric as Ilijina Majka
- Miodrag 'Miki' Krstovic as Starji Policijski Inspektor (credited as Miki Krstovic)
- Olga Odanovic as Zena Kojoj Je Nestala Tasna
- Milan Tomic as Bolnicar
- Dusan Janicijevic as Starac U Autobusu
- Kalina Kovacevic as Devojka U Autobusu
- Jovan Ristovski as Gospodin U Autobusu
- Bora Nenic as Srcani Bolesnik
- Ivan Zaric as Mladji Policijski Inspektor
- Branko Vidakovic as Pijanic (credited as Bane Vidakovic)
- Tomislav Trifunovic as Simonov Bivsi Kolega (credited as Toma Trifunovic)
- Vlasta Velisavljevic as Kucepazitelj
- Radoje Cupic as Covek U Kafani
- Lidija Stevanovic as Perina Zena
- Milorad Kapor as Kockar
- Ratko Miletic as Covek Koji Nosi Bilijarski Sto

== Reception ==
=== Critical response ===
Dan Fainaru of Screen International wrote a positive review for The Optimists in which he stated that, besides the film's "seemingly gloomy viewpoint", the director's "compassion is as pronounced as his sarcasm, and his sympathy for his characters no less evident than his derision." Fainaru tied the Candide inspiration to Paskaljević's "attempts to pinpoint some of the reasons that have held his part of the world back in the past and still do to this day", he commented that the director "plays his cast like a virtuoso", that he "displays superb confidence in his choice of camera set-ups" and commended the cinematography, music and art direction. On Lazar Ristovski's performance, Fainaru commented that Ristovski's "powerful personality often tends to sweep everybody else off the screen." Stephen Holden, reviewing for The New York Times, described the screenplay as "blunt and to the point". Praising the performances as "subtly tinged with a surreal comic edge", he singled out Ritovski for his "formidable presence" whose performance paints "a grotesque composite Serbian everyman". He stated that the film's stories "illustrate the universal impulse to believe in a better future, no matter what" and thus was not as "starkly Hobbesian" as Paskaljević's 1998 film Cabaret Balkan. Bill Weber for Slant Magazine agreed: "This autumnal statement compensates for its fixed despair with bracing wit and a willingness to see acceptance of misery as the best of all possible options".

Reviewing the film for Variety magazine at its screening at the 2006 TIFF, Dennis Harvey gave the film a mixed review. Harvey stated that although the "stories' conceits have promise", "there's a certain flatness of execution that reduces everything to the same watchable but dispiritingly minor plane." He also opined that the film expresses a futility that "might well have become a powerful statement in itself" but that it is, ultimately, "is blunted by a sense of artistic inertia." Commenting on the separated narrative structure, similar to Cabaret Balkan, he stated that "Rather than parting on a note of irony or resolution, most of these tales simply deadend when situations have achieved their equilibrium of hopelessness and defeat." He reservedly commended the acting, appreciating Ristovski's work for "nimbly vanishing into five separate roles" and commenting on the other performances as being "solid if seldom inspired". On the film being inspired by Candide, Harvey commented that certain elements were notably missing. He claimed that "Voltaire's satirical savagery is missing here - not his cynicism, but the wit and fury that punched it across."

=== Awards ===
- Cinéma Tout Ecran (2006)
  - The FIPRESCI International Critics Award
  - Best Production - Goran Paskaljević
  - Young Jury Mention
- 51st Valladolid International Film Festival
  - Golden Spike
  - Best Actor - Lazar Ristovski
  - Youth Jury Award
- 23rd Festroia International Film Festival
  - Audience Award

== See also ==
- Cinema of Serbia
- 2006 in film
- List of Serbian films
