= Sestre =

Sestre may refer to:

- Sestre (drag act), a Slovenian drag act
- The Sisters (2011 film), or Sestre, a film about human trafficking
