= Cabaret Balkan =

- International poster
- Directed by: Goran Paskaljević
- Written by: Goran Paskaljević; Filip David; Zoran Andrić
- Based on: Powder Keg by Dejan Dukovski
- Produced by: Goran Paskaljević; Martine de Clermont-Tonnerre
- Starring: Miki Manojlović; Sergej Trifunović; Nebojša Glogovac; Dragan Nikolić; Bata Živojinović; Mirjana Karanović; Bogdan Diklić
- Cinematography: Milan Spasić
- Edited by: Petar Putniković
- Music by: Zoran Simjanović
- Production company: StudioCanal
- Distributed by: StudioCanal (worldwide theatrical)
- Release date: 4 September 1998
- Running time: 102 minutes
- Country: FR Yugoslavia
- Language: Serbian

Cabaret Balkan (Serbian: Буре барута / Bure baruta, lit. 'Powder Keg') is a 1998 Serbian film directed by Goran Paskaljević starring Miki Manojlović and Nebojša Glogovac. It was released in English-speaking countries under the aforementioned title, with the official reason for the name change being that Kevin Costner had already registered a film project under the title Powder Keg. The film received a number of distinctions, including a FIPRESCI award at the Venice Film Festival in 1998. It was based on a 1994 play by the same title by Dejan Dukovski. The film was selected as the Serbian entry for the Best Foreign Language Film at the 71st Academy Awards, but was not accepted as a nominee.

== Cast ==
- Nebojša Glogovac – The Chain-Smoking Taxi Driver
- Sergej Trifunović – The Young Man Who Takes the Bus Hostage
- Aleksandar Berček – Dimitrije, the Crippled Ex-Cop from the Local Cafe
- Miki Manojlović – Mane, the Homecoming Man
- Mirjana Karanović – Natalija, Mane's Ex-Fiancee
- Dragan Jovanović – Kosta, the Man with the Oar, Natalia's New Boyfriend
- Vojislav Brajović – Topuz Topi, the Ex-Student Revolutionary Trafficker
- Nebojša Milovanović – The Bosnian Serb Son Who Doesn't Want to End Up Like His Father
- Lazar Ristovski – The Boxer Who Takes the Train
- Dragan Nikolić – John's Boxer Friend
- Bogdan Diklić – Jovan, the VW Driver
- Toni Mihajlovski – George, the Eternal Culprit, Ana's Boyfriend
- Mirjana Joković – Ana, the 'Flirt' on the Bus, George's Girlfriend
- Ivan Bekjarev – The Man on the Bus Who Thinks He's Tough
- Mira Banjac – The Bosnian Serb Mother
- Marko Urošević – Aleksandar Viktorović, the young Yugo driver
- Danilo Stojković – Mr. Viktorović, Aleksandar's Father
- Milena Dravić – The Lady on the Bus with the Hat and Fox Stole
- Nikola Ristanovski – Boris, the Esoteric Cabaret Artist

== See also ==
- List of submissions to the 71st Academy Awards for Best Foreign Language Film
- List of Serbian submissions for the Academy Award for Best Foreign Language Film
