= Gvero =

Gvero may refer to:

- Milan Gvero (1937–2013), Bosnian Serb general
- Marko Gvero (born 1975), Serbian actor, acted in Doktor Rej i đavoli, Državni posao
- Vojislav Gvero (born 1998), Serbian athlete, competed in the 2021 European Athletics Team Championships
