= Legionnaire (film) =

- Official DVD cover
- Directed by: Peter MacDonald
- Screenplay by: Sheldon Lettich; Rebecca Morrison
- Story by: Sheldon Lettich; Jean-Claude Van Damme
- Produced by: Edward R. Pressman; Jean-Claude Van Damme; Peter MacDonald
- Starring: Jean-Claude Van Damme; Adewale Akinnuoye-Agbaje; Daniel Caltagirone; Nicholas Farrell; Steven Berkoff
- Cinematography: Douglas Milsome
- Edited by: Mike Murphy; Christopher Tellefsen
- Music by: John Altman
- Production companies: Edward R. Pressman Film Enterprises; Long Road Productions; Quadra Entertainment
- Distributed by: New Films International; Sterling Home Entertainment
- Release date: December 3, 1998
- Running time: 99 minutes
- Country: United States
- Language: English
- Budget: $35 million

Legionnaire is a 1998 American drama war film directed by Peter MacDonald and starring Jean-Claude Van Damme as Alain Lefèvre, a 1920s boxer who wins a fight after he was hired by gangsters to lose it and then flees to join the French Foreign Legion. The cast includes Adewale Akinnuoye-Agbaje, Daniel Caltagirone, Ana Sofrenović, Nicholas Farrell and Steven Berkoff. The film was filmed in Morocco at Tangier and Ouarzazate.

== Plot ==
Alain Lefèvre is a French boxer in 1925 in Marseille, France. His brother Maxim has asked for him to throw a fight so that both can live on the money. Lucien Galgani, the mobster who forced him to do so, requests him to do it in the second round. Galgani's girlfriend, Katrina, is Alain's ex-fiancée. He had left her standing at the altar, but Katrina forgives Alain, and the two hatch a plan to run off to America together.

Alain does not take a dive in the fight and instead defeats his opponent Julot Gaultier. Just as the escape plan is about to succeed, Maxim is killed, and Katrina is captured by Galgani's men. Alain shoots and kills Galgani's brother Rene. Desperately needing a new escape plan, he signs up for the French Foreign Legion and is shipped to North Africa to help defend France against a native Berber resistance of Rif warriors, who are led by Kamel Krifa as Abd el-Krim.

Along the way, Alain meets some new friends, including Luther Williams, an African-American who has fled injustice in the Southern United States since he felt that he would be well treated by returning to Africa; Mackintosh, a former British Army major who was dishonorably discharged because a gambling problem caused him to pass bad checks; and Guido Rosetti, a naive Italian boy who wishes to impress Anna, his fiancée back home, by returning as a hero. Alain realises that the only real way to escape from the Legion is to survive the term of service but that it is outnumbered by the rebels.

After marching for days, the troops arrive at a small pond, but before getting their full share of water, they are ambushed and shot down by the Berbers. Among the dead is Guido. After leaving, the survivors, including Alain, go to the Legion's fort.

Meanwhile, Galgani has sent his hired thugs into the Legion to find Alain. After a few days, they find him in the fort. After the commander Captain Rousselot sends Alain, Mackintosh and the others to guard the fort, Mackintosh reveals that he had been sent to kill Alain as part of a deal to reimburse his father, who was left penniless by gambling debts. Before he can do so, however, they are chased down by the natives, who advance towards the fort.

Sergeant Steinkampf sends Luther in a dangerous mission to infiltrate the natives' camp. Alain, knowing that it will be suicide, demands to go along but is ordered not to do so. Before leaving, Luther gives him his harmonica as a symbol of friendship. As Alain later guards the fort outside, he sees Luther returning without his disguise and the Berbers following behind him. As they begin attacking, Alain decides to kill Luther to give him a quick death.

Very swiftly, the rest of the Berbers take down the Legionnaires. As Viktor, one of Galgani's thugs, is about to kill Alain, Galgani gets shot down by Mackintosh, who remorsefully reveals that Katrina has managed to escape from Galgani and go to America, as she had always wanted. Alain, as a token of appreciation, gives Mackintosh a single bullet to let him commit a merciful suicide. In the end, only Alain is alive after the battle. Abd el-Krim, seeing Alain's courage and determination, allows him to live and tells him to inform his superiors what is waiting for them if the French continue their colonization. Now standing as the only survivor of the ordeal, Alain is left alone in the desert as he remembers Katrina and his former friends.

== Cast ==
- Jean-Claude Van Damme as Alain Lefèvre/Alain Duchamp
- Adewale Akinnuoye-Agbaje as Luther Williams
- Steven Berkoff as Sergeant Steinkampf
- Nicholas Farrell as Major Mackintosh
- Jim Carter as Lucien Galgani
- Ana Sofrenović as Katrina
- Daniel Caltagirone as Guido Rosetti
- Joseph Long as Maxim Lefèvre
- Mario Kalli as René Galgani
- Joe Montana as Julot Gaultier
- Kim Romer as Captain Rousselot
- Anders Peter Bro as Lieutenant Charlier
- Paul Kynman as Rolf Bruner
- Vincent Pickering as Viktor
- Takis Triggelis as Corporal Metz
- Tom Delmar as Corporal Legros
- David Hayman as Recruiting Sergeant
- Rob Kaman as Glock
- Kamel Krifa as Abd el-Krim

== Production ==
Jean-Claude Van Damme originally pitched the story of joining the Foreign Legion to escape from the mob as a more humorous vehicle starring himself and a comedian such as John Candy. The often-recorded 1936 song "Mon légionnaire" is sung over the closing credits by Ute Lemper.

There is an alternate/deleted ending in which Alain (Van Damme) rescues Katrina (Ana Sofrenović) and kills Lucien Galgani (Jim Carter) at a New Year's Eve party. However, director Peter MacDonald and producer Edward R. Pressman felt that would be too violent. Another alternate ending was scripted where Alain aims his pistol at Galgani, and the bar goes quiet, but he refrains from killing him and walks out with Katrina.

== Release ==
=== Home media ===
Legionnaire was released direct-to-video in the United States since the distributor, Lionsgate, predicted that the film would do poorly at the box office because Van Damme's drawing power was decreasing drastically.

== Reception ==
=== Critical response ===
The film received mixed reviews.

== Canceled TV series ==
Prior to the film's cable debut, Pressman voiced his intentions to turn Legionnaire into a franchise that would include a weekly hour-long action/adventure series in which Van Damme would participate as co-executive producer and guest star in a number of episodes. The series was to be financed by Quinta Communications, a French television company owned by Germany's Kirch Group, Italy's Mediaset and Kingdom Holding Company, the entertainment investment company of Saudi Prince Al Waleed bin Talal Al Saud. Unlike the film, the series was to be set in contemporary times.

== See also ==
- March or Die, a 1977 film using a similar plot.
- List of boxing films
