= Ljubomir Bandović =

Montenegrin actor

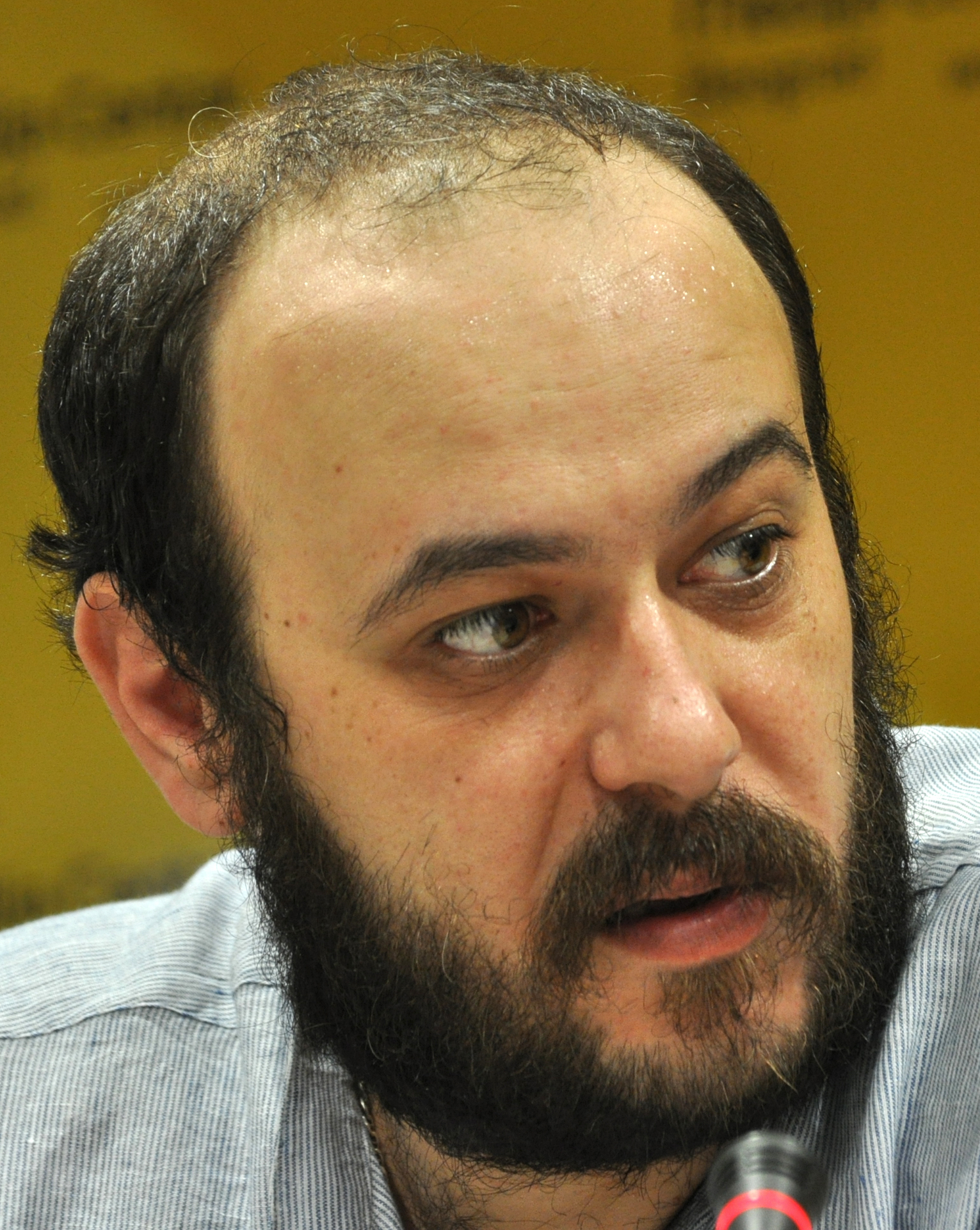
- Bandović at Media Center
- Born: Ljubomir Bandović; July 8, 1976 (age 49); Ivangrad, SR Montenegro, SFR Yugoslavia
- Other names: Ljubo
- Education: Faculty of Dramatic Arts
- Occupation: Actor
- Years active: 2000–present
- Spouse: Tatjana Bandović (m. 2004)

Ljubomir "Ljubo" Bandović (Serbian: Љубомир Бандовић; born 8 July 1976) is a Serbian actor. He has won many prestigious awards for acting in Serbia.

== Biography ==
Ljubomir "Ljubo" Bandović was born in Ivangrad, SR Montenegro, SFR Yugoslavia. He studied at the University of Arts Faculty of Dramatic Arts. He has been a member of Yugoslav Drama Theatre since 2000. He has also been a member of several other houses, including: Belgrade International Theatre Festival, Belgrade Drama Theatre, Serbian National Theatre and BELEF.

In February 2009, he has won the "Zoran Radmilović" award for performance in a theatre show Ćeif. In August 2011, he has won Grand Prix "Naisa" award for the performances in The Sisters and The Enemy. In October 2011, he was the best actor of the 31st "Borini pozorišni dani" festival, for the performance in a theatre show Pazarni dan.

== Personal life ==
He is married to Tatjana who is a painter.
