= Vukovar, jedna priča =

1994 Serbian film

- Film poster
- Directed by: Boro Drašković
- Written by: Boro Drašković
- Produced by: Danka Muždeka Mandžuka
- Starring: Mirjana Joković; Boris Isaković; Nebojša Glogovac; Svetozar Cvetković; Predrag Ejdus; Mihailo Janketić; Olivera Marković; Goran Drozdek; Mira Banjac; Dušica Žegarac
- Edited by: Snežana Ivanović
- Music by: Sanja Ilić
- Distributed by: Varnica
- Release date: 3 July 1994
- Running time: 96 minutes
- Country: FR Yugoslavia
- Language: Serbo-Croatian

Vukovar, jedna priča (Serbian Cyrillic: Вуковар, једна прича, English: Vukovar: A Story) is a Serbian war film directed by Boro Drašković. It was released in 1994. It is also known as Vukovar poste restante. The film was selected as the Serbian entry for the Best Foreign Language Film at the 67th Academy Awards, but was not accepted as a nominee. The film's slogan was Nothing is stronger than love, maybe only war!

== Plot ==
The film takes place in 1991 in Vukovar, on the eve of the Breakup of Yugoslavia. It is a typical love story, between a Croat woman Ana (Mirjana Joković) and a Serb man Toma (Boris Isaković), who marry one another with the blessing of both families right before the battle of Vukovar. Their harmonious and tolerant community is brutally divided by the start of the Croatian War of Independence. Not only they but everyone around them, against their will, are brought into the craziness of war which splits them from family and friends. Divided, living through hell, they still hope that the horrors of war will stop and that their newborn baby will be able to have a fresh start.

== Cast ==
- Mirjana Joković as Ana
- Boris Isaković as Toma
- Svetlana Bojković as Vilma
- Predrag Ejdus as Stjepan
- Mihailo Janketić as Dusan
- Dušica Žegarac as Vera
- Monika Romić as Ratka
- Goran Drozdek as Domagoj
- Nebojša Glogovac as Fadil
- Mira Banjac as Milka

== Production ==
The film was shot in late 1993 in war-ruined Vukovar, only ten kilometres from the front lines. Battle scenes were filmed in silence as to not perturb or frighten the city's few remaining civilians.

== Reception ==
=== Croatia ===
In December 1995, the Croatian delegation prevented the film from being screened at a United Nations conference, calling it Serbian "propaganda". Writing for the Croatian daily Jutarnji list, Jurica Pavičić gave it a scathing review, saying the film was consistently promoting a false equidistance between the Croatian and Serbian nationalisms in the war, which he personally found particularly irritating after the Vukovar massacre and at the height of the siege of Sarajevo. In 2009, the Zagreb Film Festival director wanted to include the film in its "Film and propaganda" session, but the film's producer retracted their permission for the showing.

=== International ===
In reviewing the film for Variety, critic Allen Young compared the Serbian-Croatian couple to the story of Romeo and Juliet and wrote that the film's "depiction of a beautiful country’s loss of its moral compass is a terrifying, dazzling achievement". In his review for The New York Times, Stephen Holden echoed the Shakespearean comparison while noting the film's "disturbing" portrayal of war and highlighting its anti-war premise. Writing for New York, Maureen Callahan stated that, although the film "isn't as technically accomplished or as seamlessly scripted as, say, Schindler's List, it is just as important and even more remarkable for its virtually real-time immediacy". Film historian Andrew Horton writes that the film's value is "equally powerful for not degenerating into a simplistic 'us against them' polemic film" but instead leaving the audience with "a troubling feeling of 'look what we have done to ourselves'".

=== Awards ===
Won

- Mediterranean Film Prize for Peace and Tolerance at the Jerusalem Film Festival (1995)

== See also ==
- List of submissions to the 67th Academy Awards for Best Foreign Language Film
- List of Serbian submissions for the Academy Award for Best Foreign Language Film

== Sources ==
- Goulding, Daniel (2002). Liberated Cinema: The Yugoslav Experience, 1945–2001. Bloomington, Indiana: Indiana University Press. ISBN 978-0-253-21582-6.
