= Ana Sofrenović =

Serbian actress

- Ана Софреновић
- Born: 18 September 1972 (age 54); Belgrade, SFR Yugoslavia
- Occupation: Actor
- Years active: 1994–present
- Spouse: Dragan Mićanović

Ana Sofrenović (Serbian Cyrillic: Ана Софреновић; born 18 September 1972) is a Serbian actress. She has appeared in more than 30 films since 1994.

== Personal life ==
Sofrenović was born in Belgrade, Serbia, to a Serbian father and Irish-English mother. She was married to Dragan Mićanović, and they have two daughters: Iva and Lena. The family lived in London, but they continued to work in Serbia and the Balkans. They divorced in November 2011.

== Partial filmography ==
Year	Title	Role	Notes
1995	Premeditated Murder	Jelena Ljubisavljevic	
1998	Legionairre	Katrina	
2000	Sky Hook	Tijana	
2012	Doktor Rej i đavoli	Betty Utey	
2014	The Kids from the Marx and Engels Street		
