= Superstition in Serbia =

While Serbia is primarily a religious country and approximately 85% of Serbs are Serbian Orthodox, superstition in Serbia continues to have an effect on its culture in mostly rural parts of the country, where the older generation resides. Serbia was a Pagan country before the 9th century, which is when superstitious belief was formed. After the ending of the Cold War and the subsequent end of the communist rule in Serbia, religion flourished again, and with it, superstition. Serbian people share common superstitions with other European countries surrounding it, especially around the Balkan area. However, Serbia also has national superstitions that have been created and believed throughout its own cultural history. These beliefs are much more diverse than other countries in the Balkans. These superstitions have influenced how Serbs think and act around animals or in terms of mundane chores for centuries.

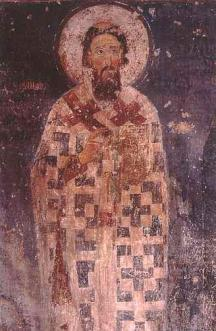
St Sava, Serbia's first archbishop of the Orthodox Church

== History ==
The people of Serbia first arrived to the country in tribes that spread across the peninsula in the 6th and 7th centuries. Some of Serbia's inhabitants identify as Romanian, who are an ethnic group sometimes called Vlachs. The Serbs believed this group had obtained mystical powers. Due to Serbia's location as a frontier to Rome and Byzantine, their religion eventually switched from Slavic paganism to Eastern Orthodox Christianity in the 9th century. In June 1389, there was a battle fought between the Serbian and Ottoman forces at Kosovo Polje, named the Battle of Kosovo. It was a draw, but is now most remembered for beginning the Ottoman's 345-year rule. This battle was considered by the Serbs as fighting for their national identity. The Ottomans ruled in Serbia until the 19th century. In the late part of the 17th century, a superstitious belief rose that Saint Sava, the founder and first archbishop of the Serbian Orthodox Church, would come to save the Serbs. They thus rose in rebellion against the Ottomans, who defeated them. Serbia gained independence in 1878. With Western influence as Serbia became politically influenced with the West, there was a desire to identify Serbian culture. It was agreed that Serbia's culture was rooted in folk culture and peasant customs. In this folk culture, superstition was included.

== Belief in mystical beings ==
For centuries, belief in vampires and other mythological beasts was present in Serbia, as well as in the neighbouring countries in the Balkans. Now it is a part of their art, music and folklore, though still believed in by the minority of the population, mostly in rural areas of Serbia, such as Zarozje.

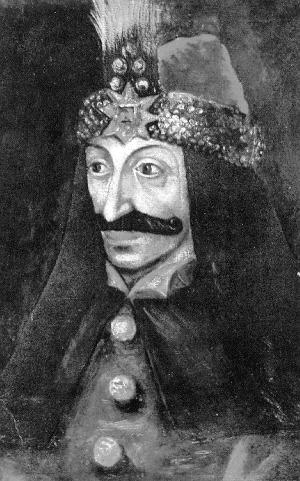
Prince Vlad the Impaler, ruler of Wallachia in the 1400s who was responsible for the death of approximately 100,000 people.

=== Vampires ===
Vampire belief began in the 16th century, though died out when education surrounding causes of death spread throughout the Balkans. The belief may have been influenced from Vlad the Impaler in Transylvania, the prince of Wallachia, now modern day Romania, in the 1400s who was responsible for impaling between 40,000 and 100,000 people. In Serbia, vampires wore exclusively white, though they did not fear the sunlight, could be active in the daylight hours and had the ability to change into animals, usually horse or sheep. They also did not eat garlic. Instead of the traditional story of victims being sucked dry of blood, in Serbia they are said to be physically beaten up. Vampires have two hearts and two souls, allowing them to be immortal. If the body of a Serb was dug up post-burial and scratch marks were present on the tomb, the Serbs believed that a vampire had tampered with the body, or that the person was now a vampire themselves. Flares of vampire sightings have come around when there have been cases of tuberculosis and other deadly types of plagues in Serbia. Vampires were a way for peasants in the Middle Ages to understand plagues that often killed entire families. Children who died without being baptised, red-haired Serbs, people who committed suicide and excommunicated people were all in danger of being turned into vampires.

=== Folklore surrounding vampires ===
Other superstitions about vampires include:

- To ward off a vampire, one must paint an extra pair of eyes on a black dog.
- placing garlic in chimneys and keyholes will not allow vampires to enter the house.
- When passing a cemetery on horseback, if the horses refuses to enter, this means a vampire is buried in one of the graves, or is lurking nearby.
- Putting thorns or poppy seeds on the path when walking to church will ensure no vampires follow.

=== Witches ===
According to Serbian folklore, witches are present in the country. In order to create havoc and spy on people, witches would turn into moths or butterflies. Witches can leave their souls behind while they engage in mischievous activity. In order to destroy a witch, she has to have left her soul. When her body is turned flat on the ground, the returning moth or butterfly she has turned into will be confused and will be unable to return to her body.

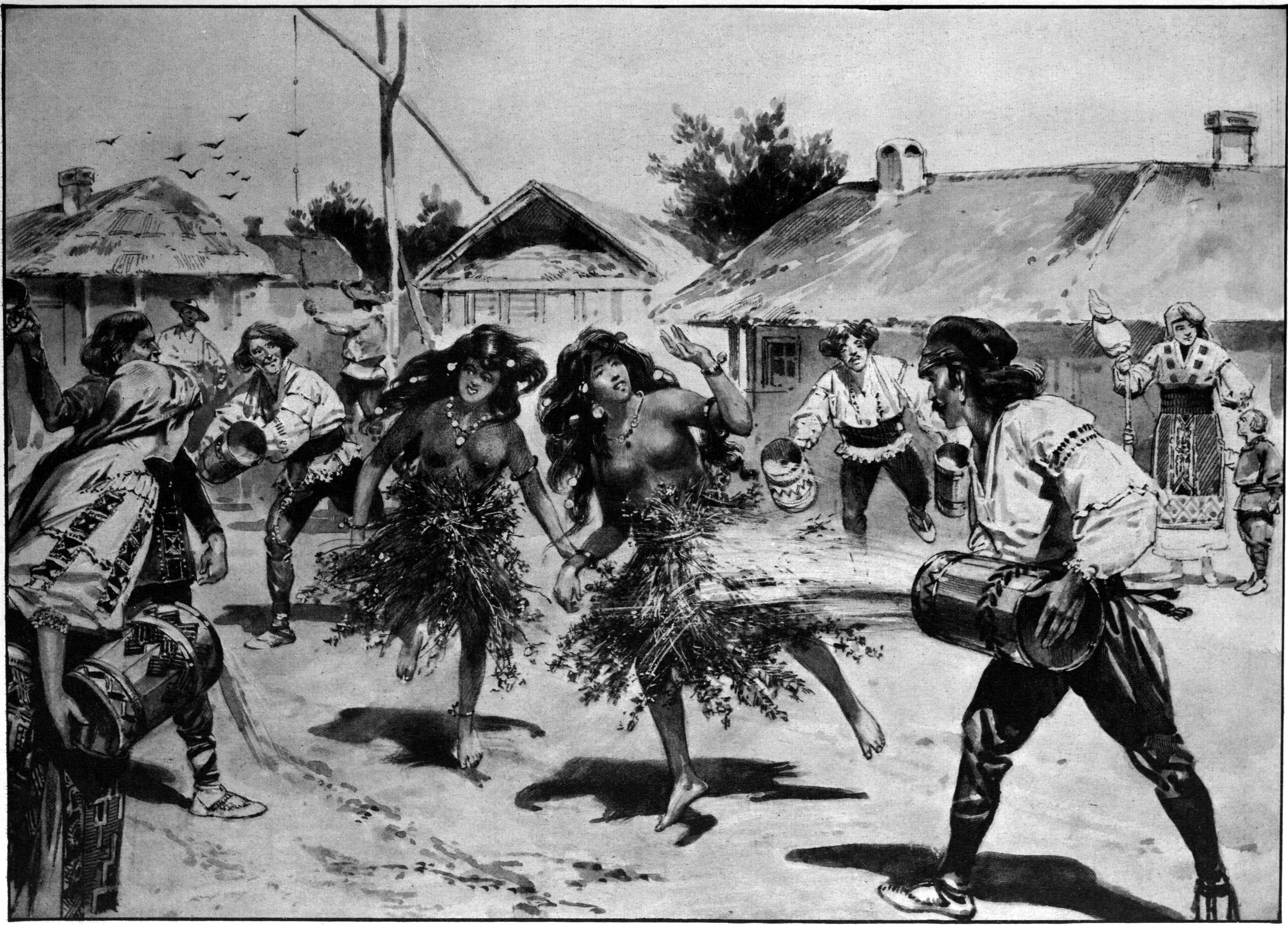
Rain-Making in Roumania: A Gypsy Incantation to Ensure the Maize Crop.

=== Dodola ===
Dodola is the Slavic goddess of rain. Usually portrayed in art as a dark-haired woman who wears green vines as a dress. She is married to the thunder god, who is also the supreme god, similar to Zeus in Greek mythology. If Dodola decides to milk her cows in heaven, the clouds will produce rain on earth. If she flies over the forest and fields of Serbia, spring will appear and all the flowers will bloom. If there is a drought in Serbia, Serbian women will perform a dance-ritual in which they will wear leaves and branches and sing to the sky to plead with Dodola. Dodola ensures human survival through water and natural seasons. Sometimes she will take human form and wander through villages, always with a sad expression on her face as her husband is eternally unfaithful to her.

=== Karakondžule ===
Small demons or goblins who appear on Christmas Day are called karakondžule. They originate from the bowels of the earth, visit for 12 days and play pranks on humans. While not seen as dangerous, they do cause a stir when they arrive, often riding on people's backs and playing with dangerous objects. They are described as black and hairy with long arms and tails, and are afraid of the light so only come out at night. Their entire purpose is to saw down the large wooden stake that holds the earth in place, but they always falter last minute in case the earth topples on them. They are afraid of holy water, but love oil vats, frying pans and oily pots and dishes.

=== Obour ===
Similar to a vampire, an obour is the short-lived version. It is the spirit of a person who died quite suddenly and refuses to leave their body. It engages in vandalism by smearing manure on walls of public buildings. An obour will also rip udders off a cow in order to mix its blood with milk and drink it. It will eat human food and will only harm humans if this food is taken away. After 40 nights of residing underground, the obour will turn into a vampire. Obours have one nostril and pointed tongues.

== Folk wisdom ==
In Serbian superstition, folk wisdom is heavily believed, especially by older generations. Some of these beliefs include:

- There are no baby showers held in Serbia, and no gifts are given to the mother. When the baby is born, friends and family are required to call it ugly. If not, the baby will be vulnerable to the evil eye.
- Women wishing to get married in Serbia are cautioned against sitting at the corner of the table at meal times.
- When someone is travelling, a person back home cannot wash their clothing that was left behind. If they do, the traveller will never come back.
- If an unwanted visitor comes to the house, Serbian folklore requires that the home owner wash the floor after they visit, so that they will not come back.
- Women who expose their stomachs to a cold draught will obtain frozen ovaries, and are never able to fall pregnant.
- It is bad luck to offer an empty wallet to someone.
- When toasting, it is important to look at someone straight in the eye. Otherwise, there will be seven years of bad luck in the bedroom.
- 'Cheers!' is only exclaimed when drinking alcohol. Any other type of drink is excluded from this phrase.
- Black cats bring bad luck.
- If one dreams of a horse, it will bring them good luck.
- Whistling while in the house will entice mice to enter.
- Crows, stepping on crickets and owls are all omens of bad luck.
- Incontinence in women is caused by sitting on wood benches (especially while waiting for buses)
- Opening 2 windows in a room or residence, especially if to create cross ventilation during a hot day, brings in evil spirits with the created breeze.

=== Promaja ===
Promaja is the term used for the cold draft generated by opening two windows in a room. Superstitious Serbians believe this cold wind, known as promaja, poses serious health risks such as stiffened muscles, colds and a numb feeling in the body. It is also said to cause sorrow and misfortune to the person who has opened both of the windows.

== Death ==
Superstitious Serbians believe that death and place of burial has importance in how the afterlife will fare.

=== Relocation of burials of famous people ===
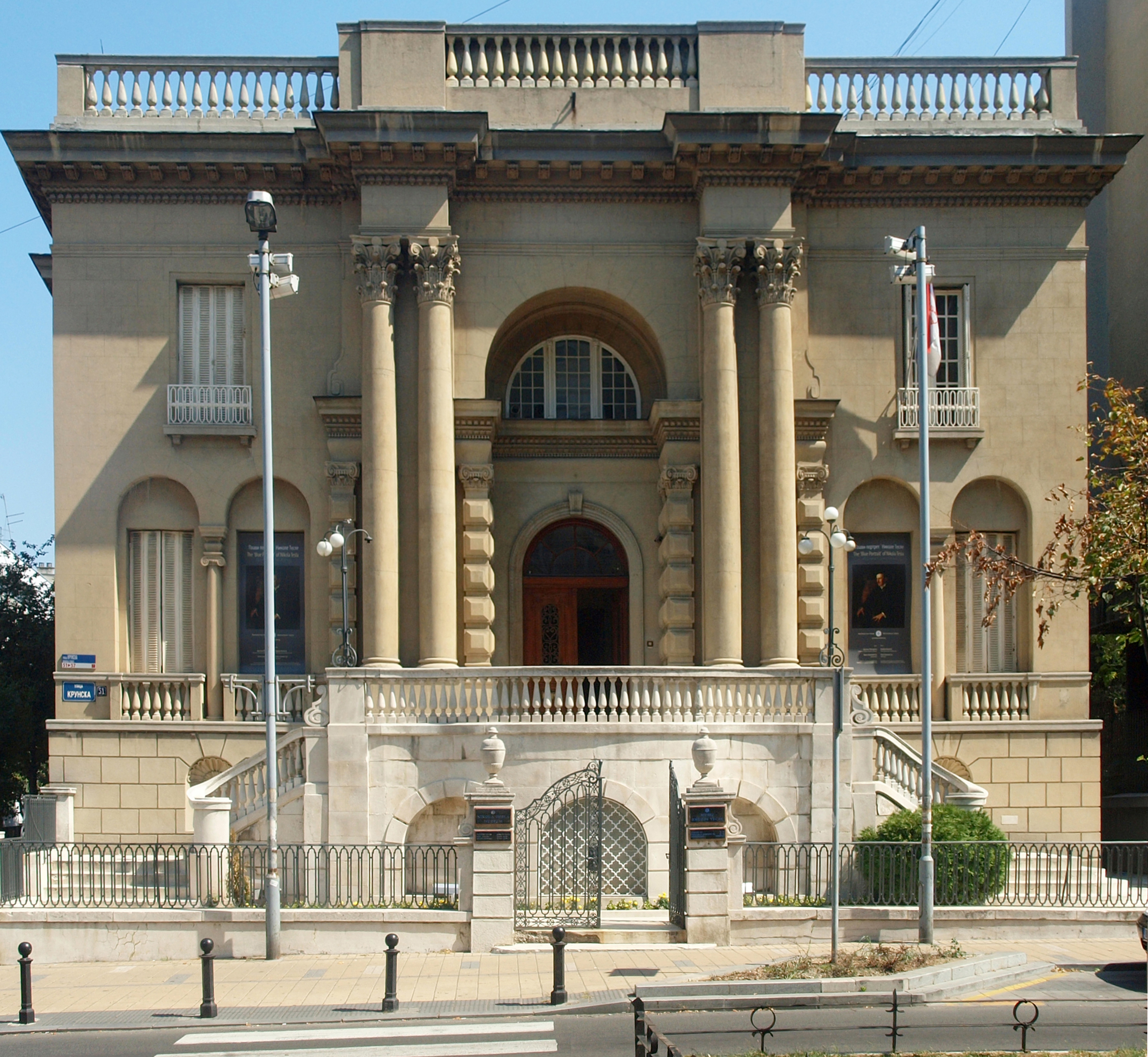
The Museum of Nikola Tesla, where his ashes are kept in a gilded urn.

It is common for a famous person's body to be relocated to Serbia. It is not only reserved for those who lived in Serbia; the body of Serbian U.S. electrical engineer Nikola Tesla was relocated to Serbia in 1957 after he died in New York after being hit by a taxicab and never fully recovering from his injuries, which included three broken ribs and a wounded back. The first known relocated burials in Serbia were the bodies of the ruling families. These families were a part of the church, and were buried in various monasteries around the country. One monk was transferred 15 times. Saints who died outside of the country were included in the reburial ceremony.

== Popular culture ==
Even celebrities have fed into superstitions. Ana Ivanovic, a Serbian female tennis player is deeply superstitious. In an interview to the Telegraph in 2010, she said that she does not set foot on tennis court lines before her match, otherwise she believes she will lose the game.

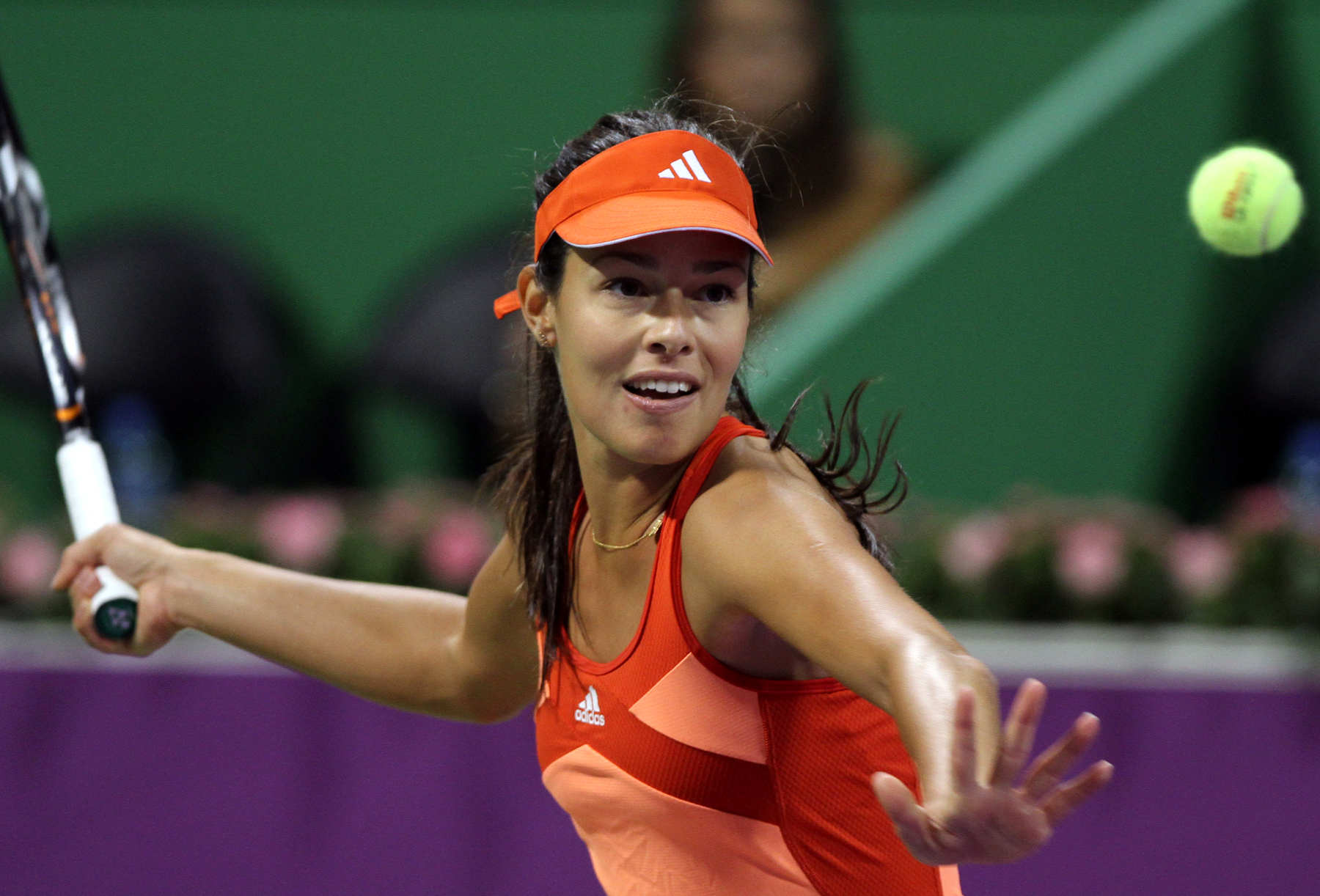
Serbia's Ana Ivanovic in action during the Qatar Open Tennis Tournament.

=== Kleopatra in the 20th century ===
Kleopatra was the name given to a transgender prophet throughout the 20th century. She became famous for predicting the future for those who would call in to her national television show. Her predictions covered everything from marriage to the NATO bombing of Yugoslavia during the Kosovan war.

=== Milan Tarot and 'Tarot Srbija' ===
Milan Tarot (real name: Milan Radonjić) was born in Belgrade in 1973. He is a television personality and tarot card reader in the Belgrade area. After finishing high school, Milan worked on late night TV stations and gradually gained popularity through interviews. Milan will only take a call from a follower if they repeat the word 'Tarot' several times after greeting him. He will take part in a reading, and then impulsively hang up the phone after giving his answer. He will often give ridiculous advice, mentioning famous Western celebrities that middle-aged Balkan women would not recognise, and asking callers to run around their house three times, or break eggs on their heads.

Due to his growing fame and comical advice, Red Productions, a Balkan film company, have created a documentary titled 'Tarot Srbija'. In the documentary, Milan tours around the Balkans and gives advice to mostly rural people, who are his most dedicated fans. The film premiered in 2010 in Belgrade with mostly positive reviews.

== See also ==
- Religion in Serbia
- Slavic paganism
- Vampires in popular culture
