= Lena Bogdanović =

Serbian actress

- Лена Богдановић
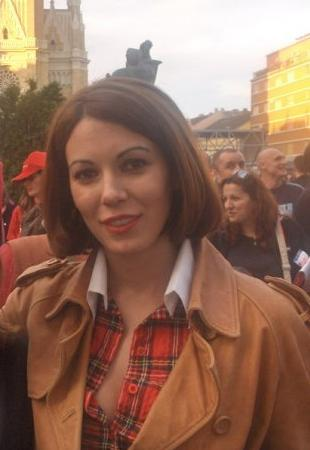
- Bogdanović in 2008
- Born: 29 December 1974 (age 51); Novi Sad, SFR Yugoslavia (present day Serbia)
- Occupation: Actress

Lena Bogdanović (born 29 December 1974) is a Serbian actress. She is the daughter of journalist Duško Bogdanović.

Bogdanović graduated from Karlovci Gymnasium and graduated in Acting from the Academy of Arts on Novi Sad in 1997 in the class of Professor Branko Pleša.

From 1997 to 2000 she was a member of the ensemble of the Youth Theatre in Novi Sad, and since 2000, the drama ensemble of the Serbian National Theatre.

She was a participant of the first season of Ples sa zvezdama, the Serbian version of Dancing with the Stars.

== Filmography ==
| Year | Title | Role |
|---|---|---|
| 1999 | Morte di una ragazza perbene | |
| 2000 | L' Impero | |
| 2000 | Il furto del tesoro | |
| 2001 | Sve je za ljude | Rozamunda |
| 2003 | 011 Beograd | |
| 2004 | Matilda | |
| 2004 | Da nije ljubavi, ne bi svita bilo | Doctor |
| 2005 | A View from Eiffel Tower | |
| 2005 | Potera za sreć(k)om | Speaker |
| 2005 | Idealne veze | Doctor Ivana |
| 2006 | Tri linije ljubavi | Guide |
| 2007 | Agi i Ema | Aunt |
| 2007 | Ono naše što nekad bejaše | Primadona |
| 2007–2008 | Urota | Jana Carić |
| 2008 | Miloš Branković | Sonja |
| 2009 | Drug Crni u Narodnooslobodilačkoj borbi | Comrade Rosalia |
| 2009 | Đavolja varoš | Marna |
| 2010 | A Serbian Film | Doctor |
| 2010 | Plavi voz | School Principal |
| 2011–2015 | Žene sa Dedinja | Alisa Velebit |
| 2012 | Doktor Rej i đavoli | Nada |
| 2017–2018 | Istine i laži | Zora |
| 2019 | Pogrešan čovjek | Inspector Sonja Ivanov |
