= Dejan Dukovski =

Macedonian playwright

- Дејан Дуковски
- Born: 1969 (age 56–57); Skopje, SR Macedonia, SFR Yugoslavia
- Occupation: Playwright

Dejan Dukovski (Macedonian: Дејан Дуковски; born 1969) is a Macedonian playwright. He is best known for his 1994 play Powder Keg.
