= Sanja Savić Milosavljević =

Serbian screenwriter and film director

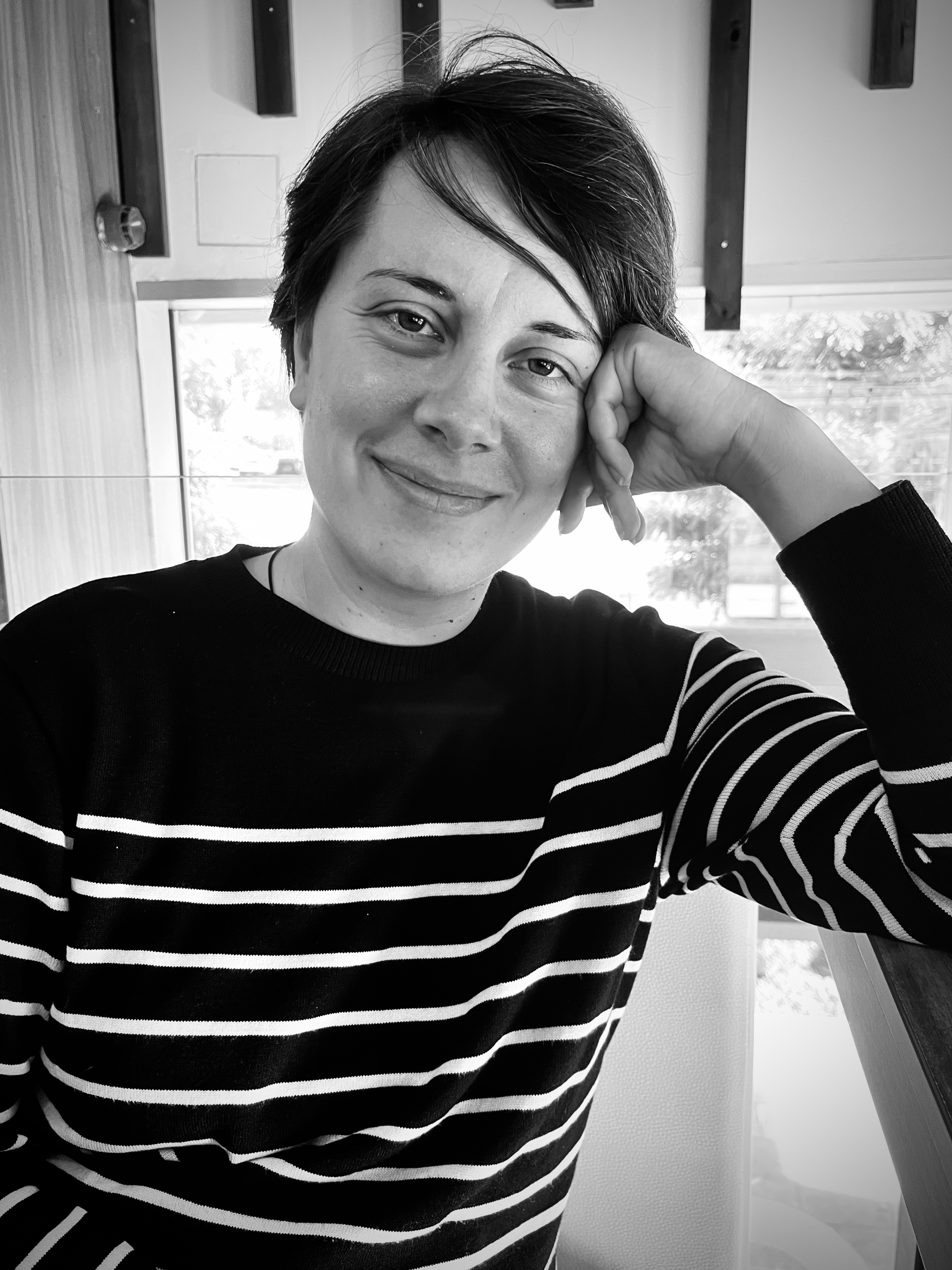
- Born: December 31, 1988 (age 37); Sarajevo, Yugoslavia
- Education: University of Arts in Belgrade
- Spouse: Mladen Milosavljević
- Writing career
- Notable awards: Golden Antenna Award; Slobodan Stojanović Award

Sanja Savić Milosavljević (Serbian: Сања Савић Милосављевић; born December 31, 1988) is a Serbian screenwriter, film director, novelist, playwright and assistant professor at the Department of General Literature and Theatrology of the Philosophical Faculty at the University of East Sarajevo in Pale, Bosnia and Herzegovina.

== Theatrical work ==
Savić Milosavljević made her debut as a playwright with the play Kod šejtana ili Jedna dobra žena (With the Devil, or One Good Woman), which premiered in the Stefanović Karadzic theater in 2018. This was followed by Srebrni car (The Silver King, premiered 2020) and Kao da ne bismo (As if we wouldn't, premiered 2022), both of which premiered in the Puls Theater in Lazarevac, Serbia.

== Literary works ==
Published collections of short stories:

- Kad žirafa progovori (When the Giraffe Speaks, 2010)
- Vrijeme vašara (Fair Time, 2013)
- Brda (2020)
- Priče lopova poštenjačine (Tales of Honest Thieves, 2021)

Published novels:

- Neoštrine (2016)
- Tuđa kost (2019)
- Teferič na Slaviji (2022)

Published plays:

- Srebrni car (The Silver King, 2017)
- Ptice i druge drame (Birds and Other Drama, 2019)
- Ulica presovanih žaba (The Street of Pressed Frogs)

Savić Milosavljević also published a collection of poems entitled Unutrašnji reljefi (Inner Reliefs, 2023) and participated in the novelization of the animated film Priča o Miki mravu (The Tale of Mickey the Ant, 2023).

The value of Milosavljević's works was recognised by the commission of the Creative Europe program, which supported the translation of Neoštrine into German as part of a project implemented by the Arete Publishing House.

== TV and film ==
Savić Milosavljević worked as screenwriter on the following television series:

- Vreme zla (The Time of Evil, 15-episode series first broadcast on Nova S in 2021)
- Vreme smrti (Time of Death; 15 episodes; set to premiere in 2024)
- Branilac (The Defender, 4 episodes of the second season)

She is the co-screenwriter of the 2022 film Čudotvorac Tumanski (Tumanski the Miracle Worker).

As screenwriter and director, she shot three short animated films:

- Bubamara (The Ladybird, 2011)
- Kako mravi i krave utiču na ženski život (How Ants and Cows Affect Women's Lives, 2013)
- Priča o Miki mravu (The Tale of Mickey the Ant, 2019)

Savić Milosavljević also wrote and directed the feature film Naši očevi, majke i njihova djeca (Our Fathers, Mothers, and their Children), which premiered at the 2017 FEST film festival in Belgrade, Serbia.

== Awards ==
Savić Milosavljević's works have been shortlisted for the Beogradski Pobednik Award, Meša Selimović Award, and Grozdana Olujić award.

In 2022, Savić Milosavljević was awarded the Golden Antenna Award at the Fedis festival in Belgrade, Serbia for her work on Vreme zla.

In 2023, she was awarded the Slobodan Stojanović award for her play Ulica presovanih žaba.
