= Mirjana Joković =

Serbian actress

- Мирјана Јоковић
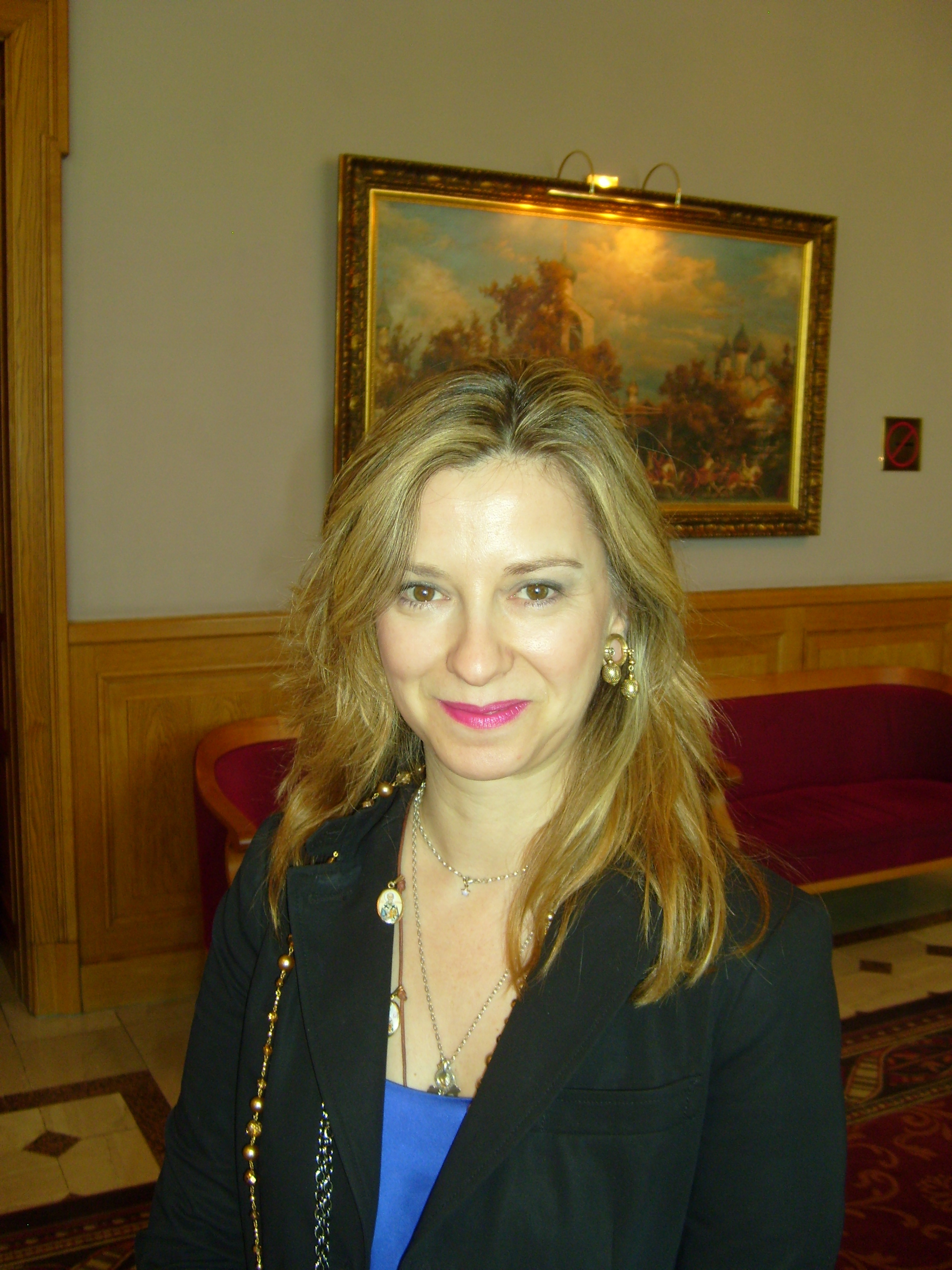
- Mirjana Jokovic as a U.S. cultural envoy in Moscow, June 2010
- Born: 24 November 1967 (age 58); Užice, SR Serbia, SFR Yugoslavia (now Serbia)
- Other name: Mira Joković
- Occupation: Actress
- Years active: 1979–present
- Height: 1.76 m (5 ft 9 in)
- Awards: San Sebastián International Film Festival – Best Actress; 1989 Eversmile, New Jersey – Estela; Cottbus Film Festival of Young East European Cinema; 1997 Tri letnja dana – Sonja

Mirjana Joković (Serbian Cyrillic: Мирјана Јоковић; born 24 November 1967) is a Serbian film and stage actress, best known for her role as Natalija Zovkov in Emir Kusturica's Underground (1995). She currently is Director of Performance for Acting and an acting teacher in the Theater Faculty of the California Institute of the Arts near Los Angeles.

== Early career in Yugoslavia ==
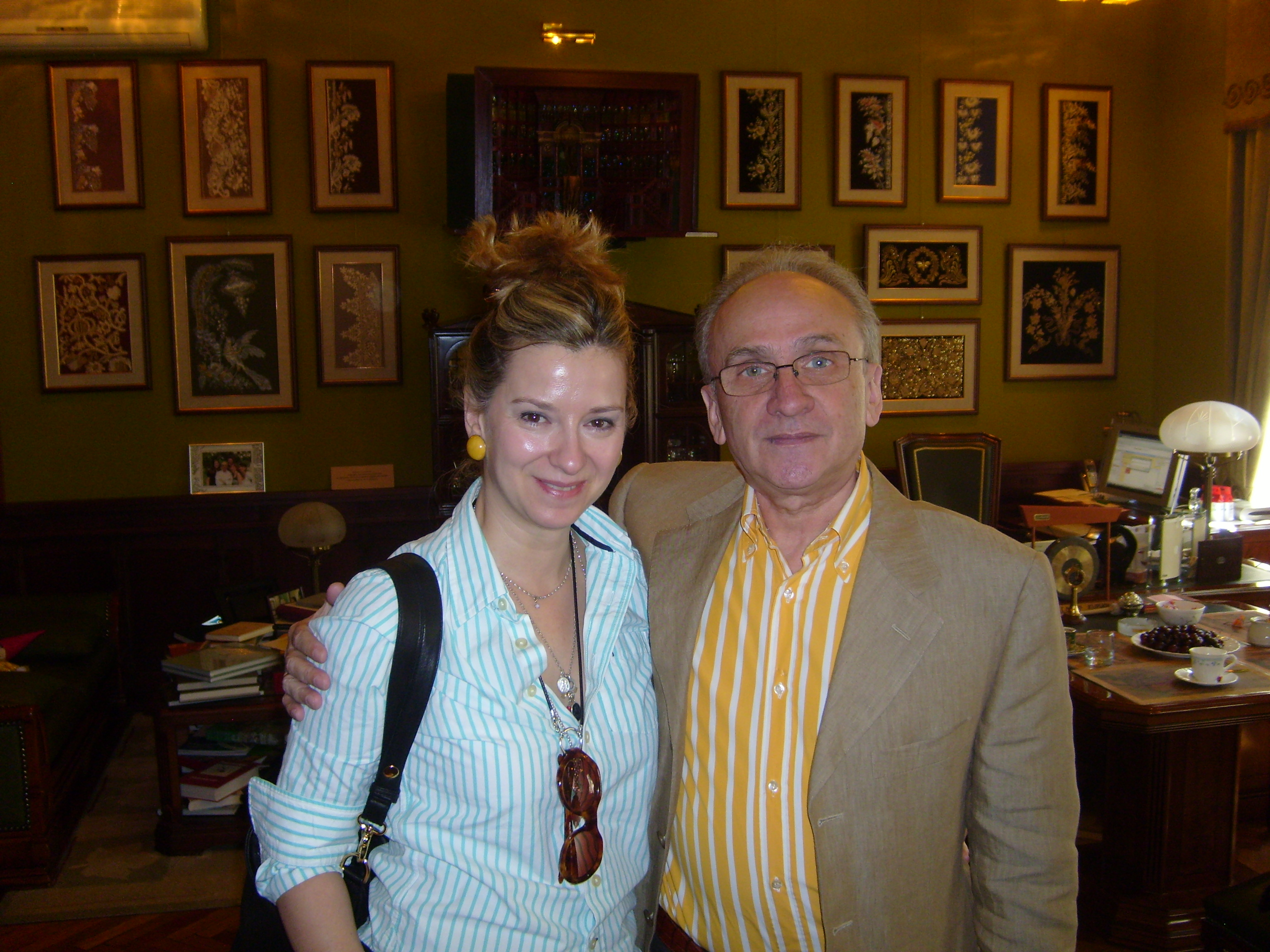
Mirjana Jokovich as a U.S. cultural envoy with Anatoliy Smelyanskiy, Director of the Moscow Art Theater School, in June 2010

Mirjana Jokovic was born in Užice, SFR Yugoslavia. She spent her early years in Zambia, where her father was an industrial engineer. She graduated from the Academy of Dramatic Arts in Belgrade and began to perform at the National Theater and the Yugoslav Drama Theater in Belgrade and in films and television. She made her acting debut in the drama series Put na jug (Southbound). She was a regular character in the popular Yugoslav television series "Grey Home", and in 1988 she was named Best Leading Actress at the Rio de Janeiro Film Festival and Best International Actress at the San Sebastian Film Festival in Spain.

In 1989, she starred with Daniel Day-Lewis in the Argentine-British film "Eversmile, New Jersey" directed by Carlos Sorin and won best actress for the role at the San Sebastián International Film Festival. in 1991 she played the lead in the German film The Serbian Girl, then she moved to the United States, though she continued to make films in Europe. She starred in "Vukovar" (1994) which earned her the Yugoslav Best Actress Award. In 1995 she played the female lead in the film "Underground", directed by Emir Kusturica, which won the Palme d'Or for best film at the Cannes Film Festival in 1995 and the New York Critics Circle Award for best foreign film. She also made Three Summer Days (1997), for which she received another Yugoslav Best Actress Award, and Cabaret Balkan, which won a Special Venice Film Festival Award in 1999.

== Career in the American theater and film ==
Her career in the United States began in theater, as she appeared in the off-Broadway production of "Mud, River Stone" by Lynn Nottage at the Playwrights Horizon Theater. She also appeared in the chorus and as Chrysothemis in the Broadway production of Electra directed by David Leveaux.

From 1999 through 2001 she worked at the American Repertory Theater in Cambridge, Massachusetts. Her roles at ART included Dulle Griet in "Full Circle" by Chuck Mee, Hermione in Shakespeare's "The Winter's Tale", Desdemona in "Othello", the part of Natasha/Olga Knipper in "Three Farces and a Funeral" by Robert Brustein, and "Mother Courage and Her Children" by Bertolt Brecht.

In 2003 she played in "Romeo and Juliet", directed by Emily Mann, at the McCarter Theater and made the film "A Better Way to Die" directed by Scott Wiper for HBO. She also starred Off-Broadway in "Necessary Targets" by Eve Ensler, Electra by Sophocles at the Hartford Stage, and Three Sisters by Anton Chekhov at the American Conservatory Theater in San Francisco.

After her starring role in "Underground", she appeared in several European and American films. She played the part of Elena Iscovescu in "Side Streets", in 1998; the part of Adrijana, in "Strsljen" (also known as The Hornet, Le frelon, and Grenxa) in 1998; the part of Ana in Bure baruta (also known as Cabaret Balkan, The Powder Keg, and Baril de poudre) in 1998; the part of a hotel maid in "Maid in Manhattan" in 2002; and as Tess in "Private Property" in 2002.

In 2005 she began to teach in the Theater Faculty at the California Institute of the Arts in Valencia.

In April 2010 she helped to organize the first theater workshop via Internet between CalArts and the Moscow Art Theater School in Moscow, under the auspices of the Binational Presidential Commission created by President Barack Obama and Russian President Dmitri Medvedev. In June 2010 she was invited to come to Moscow by the U.S. Embassy as the first Binational Presidential Commission cultural envoy to stimulate new exchanges with Moscow theaters and theater schools.

In 2019 she starred in the Canadian film Easy Land.
