= Jelisaveta Orašanin =

Serbian actress (born 1988)

- Born: November 13, 1988 (age 37); Belgrade, SR Serbia, Yugoslavia
- Occupation: Actress
- Known for: Serbian TV series "Ubice mog oca" and "Vojna akademija"
- Spouse: Miloš Teodosić (m. 2017; div. 2025)
- Children: 2
- Website: jelisavetaorasanin.com

Jelisaveta Orašanin (Serbian Cyrillic: Јелисавета Орашанин; born November 13, 1988) is a Serbian actress known for her work on the TV series "Ubice mog oca" and "Vojna akademija", as well as the Serbian films "From Love: Pula to Je Raj" and "Panama".

== Career ==
From 2016 to 2018, Orašanin played the role of prostitute Tijana Popovic on the popular television show "Ubice mog oca". Prior to that, she acted on "Vojna akademija", another well known Serbian series, playing the role of army pilot Vesna Roksandic from 2012 to 2017. She was also seen in two episodes of the TV show "Andrija i Andjelka" in 2016.

Orašanin appeared in the 2017 film "From Love: Pula to Je Raj" and the 2015 film "Panama", as well as the 2011 films "How the Germans Stole Me" and "Zduhac Means Adventure". She has also done theater, acting in several plays such as "Hotel 88" and "Totovi".

== Personal life ==
Born in Belgrade, Orašanin studied guitar and piano before graduating from Belgrade University's Faculty of Dramatic Arts in 2011. She married Miloš Teodosić in 2017, a Serbian basketball player who signed with the Los Angeles Clippers. In 2018, she spent some time living in Los Angeles, in order to be with her husband. She gave birth to daughter, Petra, on 12 February 2019, and a son named Bogdan on 8 January 2021.
