= Aleksandar Davić =

Aleksandar Davić (born 1961 in Novi Sad, Yugoslavia, died 2020 in Belgrade, Serbia) was a Serbian film director and screenwriter.

== Biography ==
Davić's works examined avant-garde and neoavant-garde artistic practices. He directed music videos for different Yugoslav rock bands. He made video art, experimental videos and for his fictions Davić has written screenplays. His feature film Žurka (The Party) won the Best screenplay award in Serbia in 2005 and the Best Film Award at the Festival du Film Serbe 2006 Paris. He was a full professor of Film and Theatre Directing at the Academy of Arts University of Novi Sad and a professor of Digital Video at Interdisciplinary studies University of Arts in Belgrade.

== Filmography ==
- My Spain, documentary, prod. TVNS, 1986
- Clients, documentary, prod. TVNS, 1987
- New Year's Train, documentary, prod. TVNS, 1988
- Northern border without a number, documentary, prod. TVNS, 1989
- Dunafalvi March, documentary, prod. Terra Film, 1990
- Prince of Chaos, music video, prod. 3P, 1990
- Punishment and Freedom, documentary, prod. TVNS, 1991
- Garden, experimental film, prod. TVNS, 1991
- The Last Dada Performance, video art, prod. TVNS, 1992
- Impossible Made in Serbia I (with FIA), video art, prod. MS Pentagram, 1993
- Impossible Made in Serbia II (with FIA), video art, prod. Studio B, Idea Plus, 1994
- Absolutely Dead (with APSOLUTNO), video art, prod. Digitel Studio, 1995
- Eyewitness, video art, prod. RadioB92, 1996
- A Look At The Wall, documentary, prod. RadioB92, 1996
- Good Evening (with APSOLUTNO), video art, prod. Magic Box, 1996
- Putting Our Best Foot Forward, documentary, prod. RadioB92, 1997
- 255 Hits, documentary, prod. Aleksandar Davić, 1999
- Under The Authority Of The Police, documentary, prod. urbaNS, 2001
- The Travelling Of The Dead, documentary, prod. urbaNS, 2001
- The Party, feature film, prod. Arbos, 2004
- NS Roulette, short fiction, prod. Davic production, 2012
- The Golden Boy, short fiction, prod. Davic production, 2015
- Our Historical Avantgarde, documentary, prod. Roremachine, 2020

== Theatre ==
In 2009 Davić directed a theatre play The Crazy Locomotive by Stanisław Ignacy Witkiewicz, production of The Youth Theatre in Novi Sad, Serbia.

== Awards ==
- Authors' Award and Critics' Award, Yugoslav TV Festival Neum in 1991 for Punishment and Freedom
- Special Award for Experimental Video, Yugoslav Festival of Short and Documentary Film/Video Belgrade in 1994 for Impossible Made in Serbia II
- Golden Prize of Belgrade for Best Experimental Video, Yugoslav Festival of Short and Documentary Film/Video Belgrade in 1996 for Eyewitness
- Special Award of Magazine Gazeta Wyborcza, Media Art Biennale WRO97, Wroclaw, Poland in 1997 for Eyewitness
- Special Prize, Dokufest Prizren in 2003 for The Travelling Of The Dead
- Best Screenplay Award, Screenplay Festival Vrnjačka Banja, Serbia in 2005 for The Party
- Best Film Award, Festival du Film Serbe, Paris, France in 2006 for The Party

== Other ==
Aleksandar Davić was co-curator with Gordana Nikolić on the project Technology to the people! (case study: film and video in Vojvodina). The project was conceived as an exhibition, series of screenings, lectures, presentations and discussions on specific conditions of film, video and television productions in Vojvodina during the 20 and early 21 century. The exhibition was held at the Museum of Contemporary Art Vojvodina in Novi Sad, Serbia from February till April 2013.

== Personal life ==
Aleksandar Davić was a fan of the American baseball team the San Francisco Giants. He died of bladder cancer.
