= The Sisters (2011 film) =

- Theatrical poster
- Directed by: Vladimir Paskaljevic
- Written by: Milena Markovic; Vladimir Paskaljevic; Bojana Maljevic
- Produced by: Bojana Maljevic
- Starring: Ivana Vukovic; Ana Mandic; Ljubomir Bandovic
- Cinematography: Milan Spasic
- Edited by: Lazar Predojev
- Music by: Vasil Hadzimanov
- Production company: Monte Royal Pictures Int.
- Release date: 11 April 2011
- Running time: 89 minutes
- Country: Serbia
- Languages: Serbian; English

The Sisters (Serbian: Sestre / Сестре) is a 2011 film based on a true story from Serbia about human trafficking. The film was directed by Vladimir Paskaljević. The scenario was written by Vladimir Paskaljević, Milena Marković and Bojana Maljević. Maljević was also one of the producers.

The film premiered in Serbian theaters on 10 April 2011 and on Serbian television on Prva TV (former TV Fox) on 4 June 2011.

The cast consisted of unknown actors making their debut in the film, except for the oldest actor of the film, Velimir Bata Živojinović, playing the role of the sisters' grandfather. All other actors remain relatively unknown, and include Ljubomir Bandović who starred as kidnapper Tadija, and Ivana Vuković.

== Cast ==
- Ivana Vukovic as Marija
- Ana Mandic as Saska
- Ljubomir Bandovic as Tadija
- Ana Maljevic as Katarina
- Bojana Maljevic as Tuziteljka
- Milica Mihajlovic as Jelica
- Milena Predic as Ljubica
- Ivana Scepanovic as Tanja
- Boris Isakovic as Marko
