= Doktor Rej i đavoli =

- Directed by: Dinko Tucaković
- Written by: Dinko Tucaković; Saša Radojević
- Release date: March 4, 2012 (FEST)
- Running time: 80 min
- Country: Serbia
- Languages: Serbian, English

Doktor Rej i đavoli (Serbian Cyrillic: Доктор Реј и ђаволи, Doctor Ray and the Devils) is a 2012 Serbian film directed by Dinko Tucaković. It is co-written by Tucaković and Saša Radojević with input from Dimitrije Vojnov.

Loosely based on actual events, the plot centers around famous American director Nicholas Ray's 1960s stay in SFR Yugoslavia on invitation by Ratko Dražević, the head of Avala Film studio and former Yugoslav state security operative. Since, according to Tucaković, the story of Ray's Belgrade stay is "quite foggy", the film's characters were treated "more as a myth than as a document". Additionally, since Dražević's specific biographical info is entirely sketchy and mostly based on anecdotes, the actor who plays him in the movie, Dragan Bjelogrlić, said that his portrayal is "based on legend rather than biography".

Additional actual figures that appear as characters in the film are film director D. W. Griffith, film star Orson Welles and his partner Oja Kodar, French actress Jeanne Moreau, Serbian writer Borislav Mihajlović Mihiz, Bosnian filmmaker Bahrudin Čengić, American film producer Samuel Bronston, and Ray's third wife Betty Utey. Also, some actual figures are thinly disguised and hinted at behind aliases because the filmmakers didn't obtain permission from their families to use them in the film. The character of Aleksa is the Serbian film director Saša Petrović, the character of Zlatan is Serbian writer Slobodan Selenić, while Ivica is Croatian film producer Branko Lustig.

The feature film (which is part of a larger project that also includes a yet to be made documentary and a yet to be released book) premiered on 4 March 2012 on the closing night of the 2012 FEST.

The film was released theatrically in Serbia on 27 September 2012.

== Plot ==
In 1964, celebrated director Nicholas Ray — who had been the toast of Hollywood only a decade earlier having made the iconic picture Rebel Without a Cause starring James Dean — arrives in communist Yugoslavia desperately trying to re-ignite his spiraling career. Problems with drugs and alcohol have made him fall on hard times, but his name in the world of cinema still holds enough cache to get him a lucrative offer of shooting a movie with Yugoslav state funds — a spectacular costumed horror-drama based on Dylan Thomas's 1953 screenplay The Doctor and the Devils.

Ray's host, the director of state-owned production company Avala Film and former UDBA (Yugoslav state security) operative Ratko Dražević, is trying to establish a 'Hollywood behind the Iron Curtain' and feels that Nicholas Ray is a good fit in this regard.

== Cast ==
- Paul Leonard Murray as Nicholas Ray
- Dragan Bjelogrlić as Ratko Dražević
- Ana Sofrenović as Betty Utey, Ray's Wife
- Bojan Dimitrijević as Borislav Mihajlović Mihiz
- Lena Bogdanović as Nada
- Pavle Pekić as Zlatan
- Marko Gvero as Aleksa
- Tihomir Stanić as Ivica
- Jana Milić as Olja
- Gordon Murray as Orson Welles
- Ivana Popović as Oja Kodar
- Milena Predić as Jeanne Moreau
- Milan Konjević as Bahrudin Čengić
- Svetozar Cvetković as D. W. Griffith
- Lazar Stojanović as Samuel Bronston

== Production ==
=== Background ===
Dinko Tucaković had been intrigued by the circumstances of Nicholas Ray's 1960s three-year stay in Yugoslavia ever since he became aware of it in 1979 as a student at the University of Arts' Faculty of Dramatic Arts (FDU). He was told about it by his FDU professor Vladimir Slijepčević who had personally hung out with Ray in Belgrade.

Over the coming years, Tucaković became a known film director in Yugoslavia as well as a film historian and curator running the Yugoslav Film Archive (Jugoslovenska kinoteka). Since two of the most eminent sources on Ray — Bernard Eisenschitz's Nicholas Ray: An American Life and Jonathan Rosenbaum's articles — barely mention the famed director's Yugoslav days, Tucaković dug for information through private channels thus unearthing many details about Ray's life in the communist country.

Contracted by the state-owned studio Avala Film, headed at the time by the powerful and controversial former UDBA operative Ratko Dražević, Ray was approved a US$1.7 million budget to come up with the adapted screenplay from Dylan Thomas's novel The Doctor and the Devils and use it to direct a movie for which Maximilian Schell, Susannah York, and Geraldine Chaplin had been cast. A notorious alcoholic, compulsive gambler, and heavy drug user, Ray spent his time in Belgrade living in Hotel Moskva and getting acquainted with the city's cultural elite. He also hung out with Polish director Andrzej Wajda who was in town shooting Gates to Paradise, also for Avala Film. Known to be bisexual, Ray, who was married at the time, was said to have had both a mistress and a male lover in Belgrade. He furthermore had plans of getting a permanent residence in Belgrade after identifying a business opportunity for vehicle import into Yugoslavia as a Volkswagen representative and feeling that it could potentially be more lucrative for him than movies. He additionally spent some time in Zagreb as well as on the island of Hvar where he sequestered himself to do work on the screenplay.

In the end, Ray never made The Doctor and the Devils due to variety of reasons mostly having to do with Avala Film's financial problems caused by one of its co-productions — French-Italian historical adventure spectacular La Fabuleuse aventure de Marco Polo by Noël Howard and Raoul Lévy that ran severely over budget. Problems with Marco Polo forced Avala into looking for a foreign production partner for The Doctor and the Devils; when it couldn't get one on board, it scrapped the project and Ray left the country.

Some twenty years later, English cinematographer and director Freddie Francis shot The Doctor and the Devils.

By the time the Socialist Federal Republic of Yugoslavia disintegrated in the early 1990s, Tucaković was sure he wanted to make a movie about Ray's stay in the country. In Venice, at the film festival, he met with Wim Wenders, Ray's admirer and good friend who had given Ray a part in the 1977 film The American Friend before chronicling his death in the 1980 documentary Lightning Over Water. Wenders expressed interest in contributing to Tucaković's project, but nothing ever came of it due to the inability of Bandur Film, the production company behind the planned project, to access EU co-production funds.

The idea went dormant again, but what gave Tucaković hope was that whenever he mentioned the idea to film industry people at symposiums or film festivals it would always find a very receptive audience.

=== Project ===
Finally, by 2008 Tucaković had the script ready. He had also collected such an abundance of material that in addition to the feature film, he decided to also write a book and make a documentary. He decided to make the feature as a mixture of fact and fiction similar to Oliver Parker's Fade to Black about Orson Welles' entanglement with the CIA in Rome in 1948.

The preparation and pre-production for the feature film took place throughout 2009. Originally cast to play Nicholas Ray was Willem Dafoe, however, problems with the film's financing forced Tucaković into pushing the production start date back on several occasions. As a result, Dafoe dropped out of the project as he had other movies lined up. Similarly, the role of Ray's wife Betty Utey changed several protagonists due to this scheduling uncertainty. Originally cast was Anica Dobra who had in the meantime, while waiting for Doktor Rej i đavoli to start shooting, gotten other roles and eventually dropped out of the project. Her replacement was Nataša Janjić, but her theater commitments forced another change of plans so the role finally went to Ana Sofrenović. Another original idea that had to be scrapped was casting Rade Šerbedžija to play the character of famous Croatian writer Miroslav Krleža (Šerbedžija incidentally knew Krleža very well).

The shooting finally started in late 2010 and went on-and-off until fall 2011 on locations in Belgrade and Luštica, Montenegro. In addition to the acted scenes, the film features plenty of documentary stock footage of Paris and Belgrade. The 'movie within a movie' footage of the film Ray is working on is actually taken from Tucaković's 1990 horror short film Bernisa, jača od smrti.

== Critical reception ==
The early reviews following the film's premiere at FEST have been negative.

Blic's Milan Vlajčić observes that "the movie portrays two lumens of Serbian culture—Mihiz and Saša Petrović—as Dražević's suck-ups and hangers-on". He further points out that those familiar with the era will understand the movie's subtext, but expresses doubts whether even they will find it entertaining and worthwhile".

Politika's Dubravka Lakić disliked the movie, calling it "self-indulgent film prose that arbitrarily mixes fiction with fact" and referring to it as "Tucaković's 30-year-long obsession that's now out of his system, hopefully for good". She further states that "at times the movie almost turns into a chamber play with the plot entirely taking place inside a few interiors, all of which places extra pressure on the screenplay as well as the performances that fall short of what's required to elevate the story - Paul Leonard Murray as Nicholas Ray is amateurish (as is Gordon Murray playing Orson Welles) while Bjelogrlić essentially plays himself from the producer phase of his cinematic career".
