= Olga Odanović =

Serbian actress

- Олга Одановић
- Born: 29 August 1958 (age 67); Celje, SR Slovenia, SFR Yugoslavia
- Education: Faculty of Dramatic Arts
- Alma mater: University of Arts in Belgrade
- Occupation: Actress

Olga Odanović Petrović (Serbian Cyrillic: Олга Одановић Петровић; born 29 August 1958) is a Serbian theater and film actress. She graduated from acting in 1985 on the Faculty of Dramatic Arts in Belgrade, in the class of Professor Milenko Maričić. She had constant engagement in the Boško Buha Theatre for 18 years, before moving in 2006 to the National Theatre in Belgrade. She is married to actor Dragan Petrović.

== Rewards ==
She has won the following awards:

- Award for best young actress at the festival in Jagodina, for the role of Helena in Midsummer Night's Dream;
- Sterijina Award for the role of Babe Poleksija in The Emperor's champion;
- The award for best actress at the festival in Rijeka (Grube - Meeting);
- The Miloš Žutić award for the role Milica Gerasimovic in the Speakers;
- Two Zoran's mustache for her role in Cabinet Minister (Dara) and Parvenu (female );
- Annual Gita Predic Nusic for the role of Helena in Midsummer Night's Dream;
- award at music festival in Kotor for the role of Babe Poleksija in The Emperor's champion.
