= Nebojša Milovanović =

Serbian actor

- Небојша Миловановић
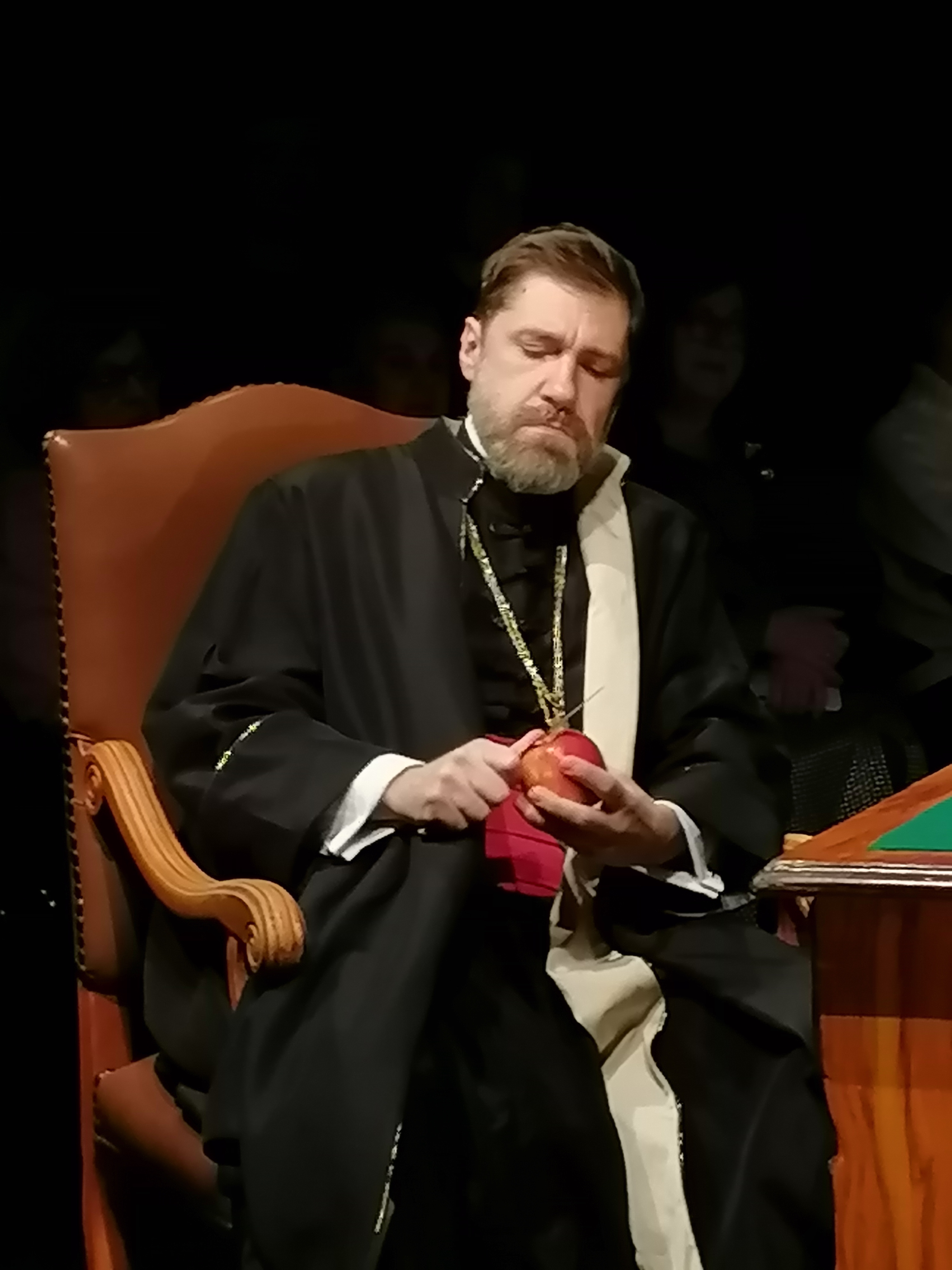
- Born: September 29, 1974 (age 51); Valjevo, Serbia, Yugoslavia
- Education: University of Belgrade
- Years active: 1999–
- Spouse: Tijana
- Children: Veru; Nadu; Stojana

Nebojša Milovanović (Serbian: Небојша Миловановић; born 1974) is a Serbian film, television, theater and voice actor.

== Early life ==
Nebojša Milovanović was born on 29 September 1974, in the Serbian city of Valjevo, Yugoslavia. Here, he received his elementary and high education. Milovanović graduated from the Faculty of Dramatic Arts, University of Belgrade in 1999.

== Career ==
Following his graduation, Milovanović entered the Yugoslav Drama Theatre (YDT), playing several notable roles in The Hypochondriac, The Suspicious Face, The Cherry Orchard, Švabica, The Merchant of Venice and so on. Apart from YDT, he also performed in Atelje 212.

== Personal life ==
Milovanović married Tijana Milovanović, and had three children.
