= List of Montenegrin films =

A list of films produced in Montenegro. For an A-Z list see Category:Montenegrin films

Title	Director	Cast	Genre	Notes
1922
Voskresenja ne biva bez smrti (There's no resurrection without death)	Vladimir Popović		Drama	
1986
Ljepota poroka	Živko Nikolić			
2004
Packing the Monkeys, Again! (Opet pakujemo majmune!)	Marija Perović		Drama	
Za šaku priganica (For a Handful or Priganice)	Ilija Vukotić		Spaghetti Western	
2005
I Have Something Important To Tell You (Imam nešto važno da vam kažem)	Željko Sošić		Drama	
A View from the Eiffel Tower (Pogled sa Ajfelovog tornja)	Nikola Vukčević			
Balkanska braća	Božidar Nikolić			
2006
Taxi Drive Podgorica	Karlo Kalezić			
2007
Golden Nunchakas (Zlatne čaklje)			Kung Fu	
2008
Gledaj Me (Watch Me)	Marija Perović		Drama	
2011
The Ascent	Nemanja Bečanović		Horror, Drama	
2012
Bad Destiny	Draško Đurović			
Trinaesti Židov u Crnoj Gori (The Thirteenth Jew in Montenegro)	Jacobin Arda		Documentary	
2014
Barbarians	Ivan Ikic		Drama	
Heavens	Jelena Maksimovic		Documentary	
Holidays in the Sun	Srdjan Dragojevic		Drama	
The Kids from the Marx and Engels Street	Nikola Vukčević	Momcilo Otasevic	Drama	
Meet Me in Montenegro	Alex Holdridge	Rupert Friend, Linnea Saasen, Jennifer Ulrich, Alex Holdridge	Romance, Comedy	
Nymph	Milan Todorovic		Drama	
2016
The Black Pin	Ivan Marinovic			
2018
Lijenština (Lazy Guy)	Aleksa Stefan Radunović		Drama	
2023
Supermarket	Nemanja Bečanović		Comedy-drama	
