= List of films from Serbia and Montenegro =

This is a list of the most notable films produced in Serbia and Montenegro between 1992 and 2006, including the period when the state was known as the Federal Republic of Yugoslavia (until 2003).

== 1992–2006 ==
Title	Director	Cast	Genre	Notes
1992
We Are Not Angels	Srđan Dragojević	Nikola Kojo; Srđan Todorović; Uroš Đurić	Comedy	Praised by critics for its inventive direction Achieved great commercial success, & later cult status
Tito and Me	Goran Marković	Dimitrije Vojnov; Miki Manojlović; Anica Dobra; Lazar Ristovski	Comedy	Won Silver Seashell for Best Director (Goran Marković) Silver Seashell for juvenile acting (Dimitrije Vojnov)
1993
Three Tickets to Hollywood	Božidar Nikolić			
1994
1995
See You in the Obituary	Janko Baljak		Documentary	
Underground	Emir Kusturica	Miki Manojlović; Lazar Ristovski; Mirjana Joković; Slavko Štimac	Comedy drama	Won Palme d'Or (Golden Palm) at Cannes Film Festival (1995); Won Best Foreign Film at National Society of Film Critics (1997)
1996
Pretty Village, Pretty Flame	Srđan Dragojević			
1997
1998
Black Cat, White Cat	Emir Kusturica	Bajram Severdzan; Srđan Todorović; Branka Katić	Romantic comedy	Won Silver Lion at Venice Film Festival
1999
2000
Shadows of Memories	Predrag Velinović			Entered into the 22nd Moscow International Film Festival
2001
2002
2003
2004
2005

== See also ==
- List of Montenegrin films
- List of Serbian films
- List of Yugoslav films
