= Nikola Ristanovski =

Macedonian actor (born 1969)

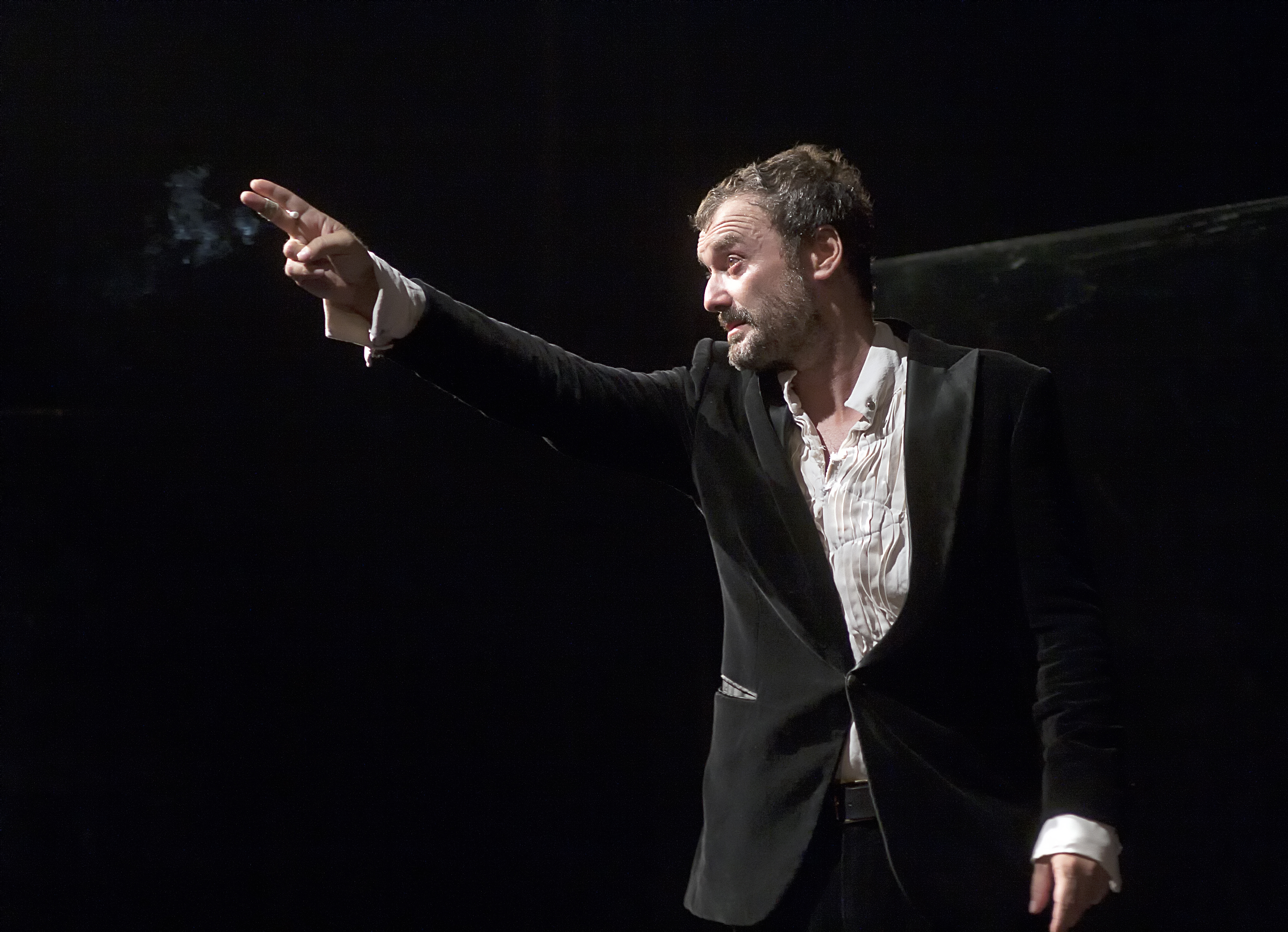
- Born: 23 January 1969 (age 57); Ostrava, Czechoslovakia (modern day Czech Republic)
- Education: Ss. Cyril and Methodius; University of Skopje
- Occupation: Actor
- Years active: 1993–present
- Spouse: 1
- Children: 1

Nikola "Kole" Ristanovski (born 23 January 1969) is a Macedonian actor. He has appeared in more than twenty films since 1993.

== Filmography ==
=== Film ===
Year	Title	Role(s)	Director(s)	Notes
1993	Light Grey	Ringo / Bronski	Srđan Janićijević, Darko Mitrevski & Aleksandar Popovski	Segments: "Wonderful World" & "Devil in the Heart"
1997	Across the Lake	Konstantin	Antonio Mitrikeski	
1998	Cabaret Balkan	Boris, the Esoteric Cabaret Artist	Goran Paskaljević	
1998	Goodbye, 20th Century!	Kuzman	Darko Mitrevski & Aleksandar Popovski	Segment: "2019"
2003	One of Death's Faces	Unknown	Filip Čemerski	Short film
2007	Does It Hurt? The First Balkan Dogma	Unknown	Aneta Lesnikovska	
2007	Movie	Narrator	Ivo Trajkov	
2007	Upside Down	Petar	Igor Ivanov Izi	
2009	Autumn in My Street	Kockar	Miloš Pušić	
2010	Montevideo, God Bless You!	Bulgarian Official	Dragan Bjelogrlić	
2010	One	Unknown	Vardan Tozija	Short film
2011	This Is Not an American Movie	Screenwriter	Sašo Pavlovski	
2011	The Little Love God	Nikola	Željko Sošić	
2012	Balkan Is Not Dead	Osman Beg	Aleksandar Popovski	
2014	The Reaper	Kreso	Zvonimir Jurić	
2014	To the Hilt	Cvetko	Stole Popov	
2014	Return	Giancarlo	Dina Duma	Short film
2015	Honey Night	Nikola	Ivo Trajkov	
2016	Amok	Goran	Vardan Tozija	
2016	The Liberation of Skopje	Trendafilov	Rade & Danilo Šerbedžija	
2016	The Black Pin	Petar	Ivan Marinović	
2017	Zona Zamfirova 2	Hadži Zamfir	Jug Radivojević	Replaced Dragan Nikolić
2019	The Team	Otac	Marko Šopić	
2019	Señor	Señor	Masha Clark	Short film
2020	The Name of the People	Older Jaša Tomić	Darko Bajić	Role shared with Andrija Kuzmanović
2021	The Only Way Out	Viktor Kolar	Darko Nikolić	
2022	You Won't Be Alone	Milan	Goran Stolevski	
2023	Dwelling Among the Gods	TBA	Vuk Ršumović	
2024	The Tower of Strength	Pleqnari	Nikola Vukčević	
2025	Mother	Father Friedrich	Teona Strugar Mitevska	
