= Tomorrow Morning =

Tomorrow Morning may refer to:

- Tomorrow Morning (musical), musical by Laurence Mark Wythe
- Tomorrow Morning (film), 2006 Serbian film
- Tomorrow Morning (album), 2010 album by Eels
- "Tomorrow Morning", song from the Jack Johnson album, On and On
- "Tomorrow Morning", song from the Natalie Imbruglia album, Left of the Middle
