= Breasts (film) =

2020 Montenegrin drama

- Film poster
- Directed by: Marija Perović
- Starring: Marija Škaričić
- Release date: 22 January 2020
- Running time: 92 minutes
- Country: Montenegro
- Language: Serbo-Croatian

Breasts (Montenegrin: Grudi) is a 2020 Montenegrin drama film directed by Marija Perović. It was selected as the Montenegrin entry for the Best International Feature Film at the 93rd Academy Awards, but it was not nominated.

== Synopsis ==
Four friends attend a school reunion, with one of the four suffering from breast cancer.

== Cast ==
- Marija Škaričić as Ana
- Vojin Ćetković as Fuki
- Dubravka Vukotić as Jelena
- Nada Šargin as Zorka
- Predrag Bjelac as Filip
- Mira Banjac as Fukijeva
- Jelena V. Đukić as Laura

== Reception and awards ==
For the role of Ana, Marija Škaričić won Best Actress award at Sarajevo Film Festival and Festival International du Film de Femmes de Salé.

== See also ==
- List of submissions to the 93rd Academy Awards for Best International Feature Film
- List of Montenegrin submissions for the Academy Award for Best International Feature Film
