= After the Winter =

After the Winter may refer to:

- After the Winter (novel), 2014 novel by Guadalupe Nettel
- After the Winter (film), 2021 Montenegrin drama film
- "After the Winter", poem by Claude McKay
- "After the Winter", short story by Kate Chopin
