= List of Montenegrin submissions for the Academy Award for Best International Feature Film =

List of films

Best International Feature Film submissions from Montenegro

Highlights
- Debut: 2013
- Submissions: 13
- Nominations: none
- Oscar winners: none

Montenegro submitted a film for the Academy Award for Best International Feature Film (Note: The category was previously named the Academy Award for Best Foreign Language Film, but this was changed to the Academy Award for Best International Feature Film in April 2019, after the Academy deemed the word "Foreign" to be outdated.) for the first time in 2013. The award is handed out annually by the United States Academy of Motion Picture Arts and Sciences to a feature-length motion picture produced outside the United States that contains primarily non-English dialogue. It was not created until the 1956 Academy Awards, in which a competitive Academy Award of Merit, known as the Best Foreign Language Film Award, was created for non-English speaking films, and has been given annually since.

As of 2026, Montenegro has submitted thirteen films, but none of them were nominated.

== Submissions ==
The Academy of Motion Picture Arts and Sciences has invited the film industries of various countries to submit their best film for the Academy Award for Best International Feature Film since 1956. The International Feature Film Committee oversees the process and reviews all the submitted films. Following this, they vote via secret ballot to determine the five nominees for the award.

Below is a list of the films that have been submitted by Montenegro for review by the Academy for the award by year and the respective Academy Awards ceremony.

| Year (Ceremony) | Film title used in nomination | Original title | Language(s) | Director | Result |
|---|---|---|---|---|---|
| 2013 (86th) | Ace of Spades: Bad Destiny | As pik - loša sudbina | Serbo-Croatian | Draško Đurović | Not nominated |
| 2014 (87th) | The Kids from the Marx and Engels Street | Dječaci iz Ulice Marksa i Engelsa | Serbo-Croatian | Nikola Vukčević | Not nominated |
| 2015 (88th) | You Carry Me | Ti mene nosiš | Croatian | Ivona Juka | Not nominated |
| 2016 (89th) | The Black Pin | Igla ispod praga | Serbian | Ivan Marinovic | Not nominated |
| 2018 (91st) | Iskra | | Serbian | Gojko Berkuljan | Not nominated |
| 2019 (92nd) | Neverending Past | Između dana i noći | Serbian | Andro Martinovic | Not nominated |
| 2020 (93rd) | Breasts | Grudi | Serbo-Croatian | Marija Perović | Not nominated |
| 2021 (94th) | After the Winter | Poslije zime | Serbo-Croatian | Ivan Bakrač | Not nominated |
| 2022 (95th) | The Elegy of Laurel | Elegija lovora | Serbian | Dušan Kasalica | Not nominated |
| 2023 (96th) | Sirin | | Serbo-Croatian | Senad Šahmanović | Not nominated |
| 2024 (97th) | Supermarket | | Serbo-Croatian | Nemanja Bečanović | Not nominated |
| 2025 (98th) | The Tower of Strength | Obraz | Montenegrin, Albanian | Nikola Vukčević | Not nominated |
| 2026 (99th) | To Hold a Mountain | Planina | Montenegrin | Biljana Tutorov and Petar Glomazić | Pending |

== Shortlists ==
| Year | Title |
|---|---|
| 2024 | Forever Hold Your Peace |

== See also ==
- List of Serbian submissions for the Academy Award for Best International Feature Film (Montenegro and Serbia formed a single state from 1992 to 2006; its submissions are listed in this article)
- List of Yugoslav submissions for the Academy Award for Best International Feature Film
- List of Academy Award winners and nominees for Best International Feature Film
- List of Academy Award-winning foreign language films
