= Home (2026 film) =

2026 Danish drama film

- International promotional poster
- Danish: Hjem
- Directed by: Marijana Janković
- Screenplay by: Marijana Janković; Babak Vakili; Bo Hr. Hansen; Emil Nygaard Albertsen
- Produced by: Mads-August Hertz
- Starring: Nada Šargin; Dejan Čukić; Tara Čubrilo; Zlatko Burić
- Cinematography: Manuel Alberto Claro
- Edited by: Jenna Mangulad
- Music by: Dejan Pejovic
- Production companies: Nordisk Film Production A/S
- Distributed by: Nordisk Film Distribution Denmark
- Release dates: 3 February 2026 (IFFR); 13 May 2026 (Denmark)
- Running time: 105 minutes
- Countries: Denmark; Serbia
- Languages: Danish; Serbian
- Budget: €2.9 million

Home (Danish: Hjem) is a 2026 drama film co-written, and directed by Marijana Janković in her debut feature. A co-production between Denmark and Serbia, the film follows six-year-old Maja and her parents, who leave Yugoslavia for Denmark in the hope of creating a better life.

The film had its world premiere at the 55th International Film Festival Rotterdam on 3 February 2026, in the Big Screen Competition. It was released on 13 May 2026 in Danish cinemas by Nordisk Film Distribution A/S.

== Synopsis ==
Six-year-old Maja migrates with her parents from the Socialist Federal Republic of Yugoslavia to Denmark in search of improved opportunities in 1991. Her two older brothers remain behind temporarily, with plans to reunite once the family establishes itself abroad. Upon arrival, the family faces many challenges adapting to an unfamiliar society, struggling with a new language, cultural norms, and the emotional strain of leaving own home. As Maja grows up and eventually becomes an artist, she builds her adult life in Denmark, yet remains deeply connected to the past her family left behind and the sacrifices that shaped their journey.

== Cast ==
- Nada Šargin as Vera
- Dejan Čukić as Marko
- Tara Čubrilo as Maja
- Zlatko Burić as Lazar
- Trine Dyrholm as Lene
- Jesper Christensen as Ejner
- Claes Bang as Jesper
- Marijana Janković as elder Maja
- Dubravka Drakic as Sanja
- Lene Maria Christensen as Britt

== Production ==
The film is based on Marijana Janković's own experiences as a migrant and developed from her own 2018 short film Maja. It was shot in Serbia in May 2024 with 40 percent of the shooting taking place on locations in the vicinity of the town of Valjevo, mostly in the village of Sušica. Filming wrapped on 29 June 2024.

In January 2025, the film was selected in Göteborg's prime Nordic Film Market run with Gothenburg Film Festival from 29 to 31 January.

== Release ==
In May 2024, Copenhagen-based TrustNordisk acquired international rights to the film. In January 2026, before its world premiere the film was sold to Beta Film, Bulgaria, the Baltics (Estinfilm OÜ) and September Films, Singapore.

Home had its world premiere at the 55th International Film Festival Rotterdam on 3 February 2026, in the Big Screen Competition section. It was released on 13 May 2026 in Danish cinemas by Nordisk Film Distribution A/S.

It was also screened at the 32nd Sarajevo Film Festival on 21 August 2026, in the Open Air Premiere, competing for the Prix Cineplexx Award.

The film was shortlisted for Danish submission for the Academy Award for Best International Feature Film category of the 99th Academy Awards.

== Reception ==
In his review at International Film Festival Rotterdam, Cédric Succivalli of the International Cinephile Society rated the film with three stars out of five and wrote that the film "has a touching sincerity because of Janković's own background." Succivalli concluded that it felt a bit uneven, and it needed more focus on how all of this affected Maja. With just a little more space and detail, it could have reached a stronger, higher level.

Per Juul Carlsen reviewing the film gave it four cameras out of six and wrote that the film feels slow and heavy, with little variation in rhythm.

== Accolades ==
| Award | Date of ceremony | Category | Recipient | Result | Ref. |
|---|---|---|---|---|---|
| International Film Festival Rotterdam | 8 February 2026 | Big Screen Competition | Home | Nominated | |
