= Train Driver's Diary =

2016 film

- Film poster
- Directed by: Miloš Radović
- Written by: Miloš Radović
- Starring: Lazar Ristovski
- Release dates: 23 June 2016 (Moscow); 14 September 2016 (Serbia)
- Running time: 89 minutes
- Country: Serbia
- Language: Serbian

Train Driver's Diary (Serbian: Дневник машиновође / Dnevnik mašinovođe) is a 2016 Serbian drama film directed by Miloš Radović. It was selected as the Serbian entry for the Best Foreign Language Film at the 89th Academy Awards, but it was not nominated.

== Plot ==
The film tells the story of a train driver Ilija who accidentally runs over many people during his employment. His beautiful girlfriend also dies on the railroad. One day on the railway he sees a young boy who wishes to commit suicide and Ilija saves him. Thus Sima becomes his adopted son. At first Ilija is against his wish to also become a train driver because of his own bad experiences but then Ilija changes his mind when he sees that Sima is determined. However later the young man becomes depressed because he does not run over anyone and is in a constant state of dread. Ilija is ready to sacrifice his own life to heal Sima's melancholy. Luckily, Sima runs over another man – Ljuba the Maniac instead of Ilija. The film ends with Ilija sitting in a train where his adopted son is the driver.

== Cast ==
- Lazar Ristovski as Ilija
- Petar Korać as Sima
- Pavle Erić as young Sima
- Mirjana Karanović as Jagoda
- Jasna Đuričić as Sida

== Awards ==
At the 38th Moscow International Film Festival the film won the audience award. The film won three awards at the 2017 Prague Independent Film Festival – the Grand Prix, Best Actor (Lazar Ristovski), and Best Feature Film.

== See also ==
- List of submissions to the 89th Academy Awards for Best Foreign Language Film
- List of Serbian submissions for the Academy Award for Best Foreign Language Film
