= When Day Breaks =

2012 film

- Film poster
- Directed by: Goran Paskaljević
- Written by: Filip David; Goran Paskaljević
- Produced by: Goran Paskaljević
- Starring: Mustafa Nadarević
- Cinematography: Milan Spasić
- Release date: 17 August 2012
- Country: Serbia
- Language: Serbian

When Day Breaks (Serbian: Кад сване дан, romanized: Kad svane dan) is a 2012 Serbian drama film directed by Goran Paskaljević. The film was selected as the Serbian entry for the Best Foreign Language Oscar at the 85th Academy Awards, but it did not make the final shortlist.

== Cast ==
- Mustafa Nadarević as Professor Miša Brankov
- Mira Banjac as Ana Brankov
- Zafir Hadžimanov as Marko Popović
- Predrag Ejdus as Rabbi
- Meto Jovanovski as Mitar
- Toma Jovanović as Najfeld
- Rade Kojadinović as Kosta Brankov
- Olga Odanović as a Refugee
- Nada Šargin as Marija
- Damir Todorović as German Officer

== See also ==
- List of submissions to the 85th Academy Awards for Best Foreign Language Film
- List of Serbian submissions for the Academy Award for Best Foreign Language Film
