= I Have Something Important to Tell You =

- Directed by: Željko Sošić
- Written by: Željko Sošić
- Produced by: Branko Baletić
- Starring: Bojan Marović; Dragan Nikolić; Milan Gutović
- Cinematography: Vladimir Vučinić
- Release date: 2005 (Montenegro)
- Countries: Serbia; Montenegro
- Languages: Montenegrin; Serbia

I Have Something to Tell You (Serbian: A Imam nešto važno da vam kažem) is a 2005 Montenegrin drama film directed by Željko Sošić, in 2005. Montenegro's new cinema starts with this movie.

== Cast ==
- Bojan Marović
- Dragan Nikolić
- Natasa Ninković
- Branimir Popović
- Dejan Ivanić
- Marina Savić
- Milan Gutović
- Varja Đukić
