= Ace of Spades: Bad Destiny =

2012 film

- Film poster
- Directed by: Draško Đurović
- Written by: Obrad Nenezic
- Starring: Predrag Bjelac
- Cinematography: Savo Jovanovic
- Edited by: Ivan Zirojevic; Igor Bakic
- Music by: Zoran Kraljevski; Dalibor Nedovic; Autogeni trening
- Release date: 3 August 2012
- Running time: 96 minutes
- Country: Montenegro
- Language: Serbo-Croatian

Ace of Spades: Bad Destiny (Serbo-Croatian: As pik - loša sudbina) is a 2012 Montenegrin drama film directed by Draško Đurović. The film was selected as the Montenegrin entry for the Best Foreign Language Film at the 86th Academy Awards, It was the first time Montenegro submitted a film for the Best Foreign Language Oscar, but it was not nominated.

== Cast ==
- Predrag Bjelac
- Danilo Celebic
- Rastko Jankovic
- Vojislav Krivokapic
- Michael Madsen
- Milica Milsa
- Miro Nikolic
- Momcilo Otasevic
- Marta Picuric
- Momo Picuric
- Branimir Popovic
- Jelena Simic
- Branka Stanic
- Slavko Klikovac

== See also ==
- List of submissions to the 86th Academy Awards for Best Foreign Language Film
- List of Montenegrin submissions for the Academy Award for Best Foreign Language Film
