= Kalki 2898 AD =

2024 Indian film by Nag Ashwin

- Theatrical release poster
- Directed by: Nag Ashwin
- Written by: Nag Ashwin
- Dialogues by: Sai Madhav Burra; Nag Ashwin; B S Sarwagna Kumar
- Produced by: C. Aswini Dutt
- Starring: Amitabh Bachchan; Kamal Haasan; Prabhas; Deepika Padukone; Shobana; Disha Patani
- Cinematography: Djordje Stojiljkovic
- Visual effects by: Hemanth Vundemodalu; Raghav Tammareddy
- Edited by: Kotagiri Venkateswara Rao
- Music by: Santhosh Narayanan
- Production company: Vyjayanthi Movies
- Distributed by: see below
- Release date: 27 June 2024
- Running time: 181 minutes (Note: The theatrical runtime of the film was 181 minutes, however in the OTT version it was reduced to 175 minutes.)
- Country: India
- Language: Telugu
- Budget: ₹600 crore (Note: Multiple references:)
- Box office: ₹1,042−1,100 crore (Note: Kalki 2898 AD's reported worldwide grosses vary between ₹1,042 (The Financial Express (India)) –₹1,052.5 crore (ThePrint) – ₹1,100 crore (Deccan Chronicle, Business Standard, Deccan Herald, Hindustan Times and The Statesman))

Kalki 2898 AD is a 2024 Indian Telugu-language epic mythological science fiction film written and directed by Nag Ashwin. Produced by Vyjayanthi Movies, it features an ensemble cast including Amitabh Bachchan, Kamal Haasan, Prabhas, Deepika Padukone, Shobana and Disha Patani. Inspired by Hindu scriptures, it serves as the first film in the Kalki Cinematic Universe. Set in a dystopian future in the year 2898 AD in the city of Kashi, the story follows a group on a mission to protect lab subject SUM-80's unborn child, believed to be Kalki, the final incarnation of Vishnu.

The film was officially announced in February 2020 and had the working title of Project K. Principal photography commenced a year later in July 2021 due to the COVID-19 pandemic. It was shot sporadically over the next three years extensively in Ramoji Film City and wrapped by late-May 2024. The official title was revealed in July 2023. The film features music by Santhosh Narayanan, cinematography by Djordje Stojiljkovic, and editing by Kotagiri Venkateswara Rao.

Kalki 2898 AD was initially scheduled for release on 9 May 2024, but was postponed due to unfinished post-production work. It was released worldwide on 27 June 2024 in standard, IMAX, and 3D formats with mixed reviews praising Ashwin's direction, screenplay, background score, visual effects, concept, penultimate scenes and Bachchan's performance. The film was also criticised for its slow and uneven first half, lengthy runtime, disjointed subplots, weak dialogue and underdeveloped characters. Its comedy, particularly Bhairava's jokes, was also considered ineffective, while some critics found its use of familiar science-fiction elements lacking in originality. With a ₹600 crore production budget, it was the most expensive Indian film on release. The film grossed an estimated ₹1,100 crore globally and has set multiple box office records for an Indian and Telugu film, becoming the second highest-grossing Indian film of 2024, the fourth highest-grossing Telugu film, and the eleventh highest-grossing Indian film of all time. The film won four Telangana Gaddar Film Awards, including Best Film, and four South Indian International Movie Awards including Best Film – Telugu. At the 72nd National Film Awards 2024, it won 2 awards including Best Production Design and Best Popular Feature Film.

== Plot ==
In the aftermath of the Kurukshetra War, Ashwatthama unleashes the Brahmastra to kill the unborn child of Uttarā and extinguish the Pandava lineage. As punishment, Krishna curses him with painful immortality and eternal suffering, condemning him to wander the Earth for six millennia until he can redeem himself by protecting the mother of Kalki, the prophesied final avatar of Vishnu.

Six thousand years later, in 2898 AD, Earth has become a desolate post-apocalyptic wasteland, with the ancient city of Kashi serving as humanity's last bastion. Kashi is ruled autocratically by Supreme Yaskin, a totalitarian God king who lives in the "Complex", a technologically advanced inverted pyramid floating above the city and accessible only to the wealthy. Impoverished, fertile women from the outskirts are abducted for Project K, a secret laboratory experiment that extracts a life-extending serum from artificial pregnancies to grant Yaskin immortality. No subject has survived the lethal extraction process beyond 150 days.

SUM-80, a captive subject, reaches the 150-day milestone and escapes the compound with help from rebels from Shambhala, a hidden mountain sanctuary whose refugees believe in the Kalki prophecy. During their journey to Shambhala, a rebel named Kyra renames her Sumathi. Their convoy is then ambushed by Yaskin's militarised forces, the Raiders, and bounty hunters, including Bhairava, a cynical mercenary seeking enough bounty points to enter the Complex. He is aided by his sentient AI vehicle, BU-JZ-1, or Bujji. Kyra sacrifices herself to help the group escape, allowing Ashwatthama, who senses Kalki's divine presence within Sumathi, to defeat the attackers and take custody of her.

The group reaches Shambhala, where nature begins to flourish in Sumathi's presence. Ashwatthama urges her to accept her role as the avatar's mother. He also reveals to his companion Raia, a young girl who disguised herself as a boy to avoid abduction by the Raiders, his ancient connection to the legendary warrior Karna through the mystical Vijaya Dhanush. Meanwhile, Bhairava bargains with Commander Manas, Yaskin's chief enforcer, to capture Sumathi in exchange for entry into the Complex. After manipulating the young Shambhalan Luke, Bhairava infiltrates the sanctuary disguised as Ashwatthama and attempts to abduct Sumathi, but the real Ashwatthama confronts him.

Using the distraction, Manas and the Raiders invade Shambhala, killing resistance leader Mariam and overpowering a weakened Ashwatthama. Amid the chaos, Bhairava touches the Vijaya Dhanush when a sacred leaf falls upon it, triggering a temporary cosmic awakening and revealing him as Karna's reincarnation. Empowered with divine combat abilities and immense strength, Bhairava destroys the Raider forces and kills Manas to protect Sumathi. He then returns to normal, unaware of his true identity.

In a mid-credits sequence, Supreme Yaskin consumes a harvested drop of Sumathi's fetal serum. It grants him immense physical power, a youthful body and multiple supernatural arms. He effortlessly lifts the Gandiva, the legendary bow of Arjuna, and vows to lead his army in reshaping the world, heralding a dark new era.

== Cast ==
Adapted from the opening and closing credits:

- Amitabh Bachchan as Ashwatthama, the son of sage and warrior Dronacharya and an ally to the Kauravas, who was cursed with immortality for attempting to kill an unborn Parikshit. He has since roamed the Earth for nearly six thousand years.
- Kamal Haasan as Supreme Yaskin, a totalitarian god-king ruling the post-apocalyptic world from the "Complex".
- Prabhas in a dual role as:
  - Bhairava, A bounty hunter
  - Karna, An ancient warrior who was allied with the Kauravas; the previous life of Bhairava
- Deepika Padukone as SUM-80 alias Sumathi, a pregnant lab subject of Project K and the prophesied mother of Kalki
- Disha Patani as Roxie, Bhairava's love interest
- Brahmanandam as Rajan, Bhairava's landlord
- Rajendra Prasad as Rumi
- Shobana as Mariam, the leader of Shambhala
- Pasupathy as Veeran, a rebel from Shambhala
- Anil George as Counsellor Bani
- Saswata Chatterjee as Commander Manas
- Anna Ben as Kyra, a rebel from Shambhala
- Harshith Malgireddy as Luke, a rebel from Shambhala
- Kavya Ramachandran as LYL-33, an undercover rebel at the Complex
- Ayaz Pasha as Ajju, a rebel from Shambhala
- Keya Nair as Raia
- Humhu as Krane, a bounty hunter
- Vinay Kumar as Commander Sirius (Note: The character's name is a reference to Sirius Black from J. K. Rowling's Harry Potter franchise.)
- Sanjay Ratha as Commander Shatru
- Venkata Ramana as Ronnie
- Hamish Boyd as Yuri
- Advait Chauhan as Isaac
- Sanghwa Shin as Leon
- Anoushka Maskey as GS-Q43
- Djordje Stojiljkovic as Garuda driver
- Keerthy Suresh as BU-JZ-1 alias Bujji, Bhairava's companion AI droid / vehicle (Voice-over) (Note: AI assistant Bujji has been interpreted as a reference to Kala Bhairava's vahana Shvana.)
- Krishnakumar as Krishna, an incarnation of Vishnu, who was born during the time of Mahabharata to bring peace by aiding the Pandavas; served as Prince Arjuna's charioteer and strategist during the Kurukshetra War (voice by Arjun Das). Krishna's character appears as silhouette and without an identity. Speaking about this decision, Ashwin said that it would otherwise just become a person or an actor but the idea was to keep him dark-skinned, silhouetted, and a mysterious figure.

=== Cameo appearances ===
- Malvika Nair as Uttara, the princess of Matsya Kingdom; daughter-in-law of Arjuna and mother of Parikshit; the last living heir of the Kuru Kingdom following the Kurukshetra War. She and her unborn baby (Parikshit) were attacked by Ashwatthama's enchanted arrow after the war ended.
- Mrunal Thakur as Divya, a lady who was assumed to be Kalki's mother.
- Ram Gopal Varma as Chef Chintu: A street food vendor
- Dulquer Salmaan as Pilot / Captain, Bhairava's guardian
- Srinivas Avasarala as a money lender and Bhairava's prospective buyer
- Faria Abdullah as Peacock: A dancer in the Complex
- K. V. Anudeep as a Complex member
- S. S. Rajamouli as a Bounty hunter and Bhairava's rival, also his ex-boss
- Vijay Deverakonda as Arjuna, the third Pandava brother and a powerful archer who was famous as the competitor of Karna.
- Santhosh Narayanan in the song "Ta Takkara" (uncredited)

== Production ==
=== Development ===
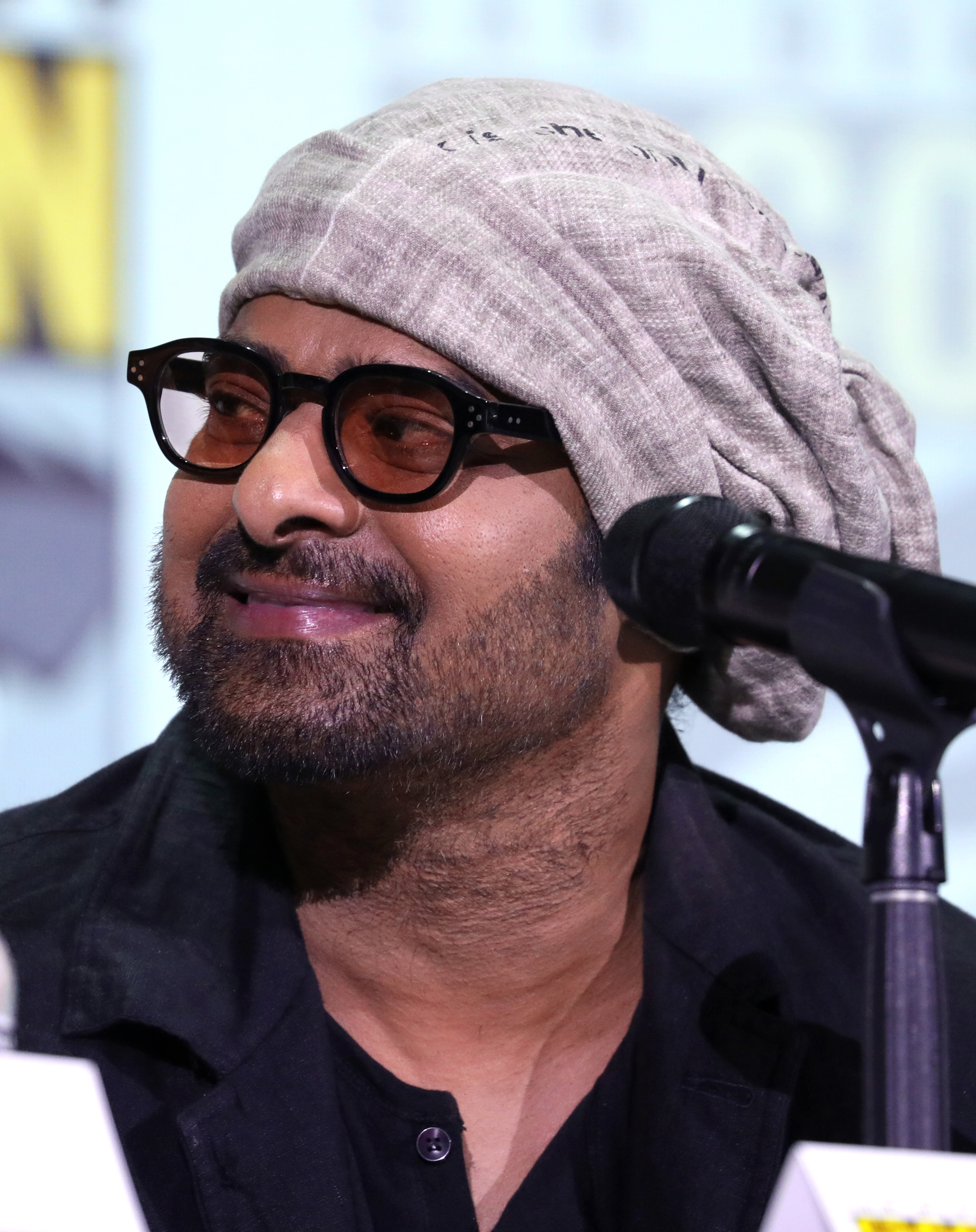
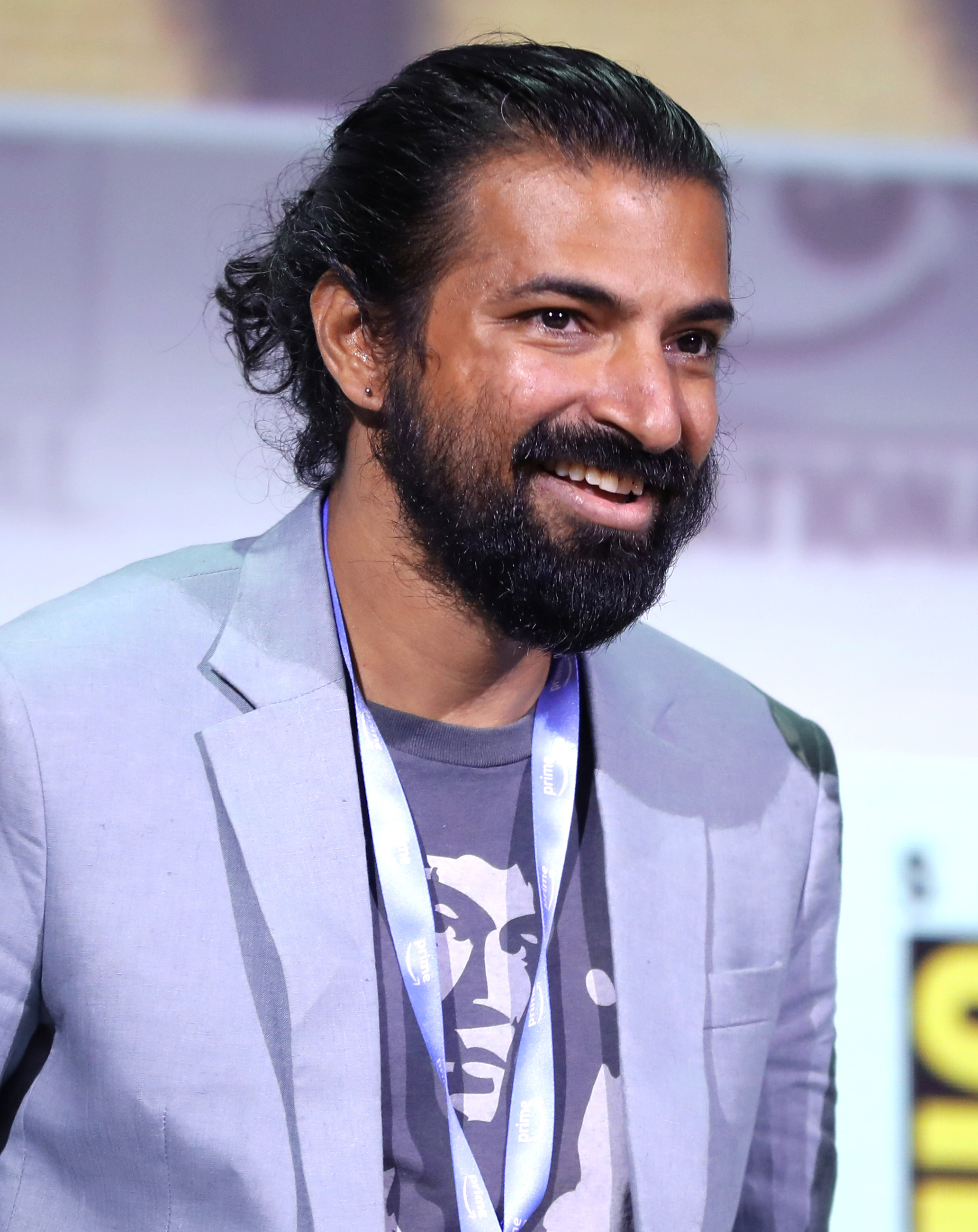
Kalki 2898 AD is the first collaboration of Prabhas with Nag Ashwin.

After the success of Mahanati in 2019, Nag Ashwin stated that he had been working on an original story, for which he had spent a long time on. He also stated that the production would begin soon. The project would be funded by C. Aswani Dutt's Vyjayanthi Movies, which also funded Mahanati. The company announced on 7 August 2019 that the production would begin in September and posted a casting call for various artist positions. On 26 February 2020, coinciding the occasion of the 50th year since the establishment of Dutt's house, Prabhas was announced to be the lead actor. Tentatively titled Prabhas 21 (as it is intended to be the actor's 21st film in the lead role), the production would begin after the actor completes filming for Radhe Shyam (2022). The film was made on a production budget of ₹600 crore that included star remuneration of ₹80 crore to Prabhas, and ₹20 crore each to Amitabh Bachchan, Kamal Haasan and Deepika Padukone.

The lead actor, however, reportedly decided to take the revenue sharing model, receiving ₹80 crore as advance, and a chunk of the profits would be given to him as remuneration. In February 2021, it was reported that the filming would begin in March; however, Ashwin during the promotions for his short film in Pitta Kathalu (2021) stated that due to the COVID-19 pandemic and Prabhas' prior commitments, the filming would commence at the latter half of the year. The film's official title, Kalki 2898 AD, was announced on 21 July 2023. It is a reference to Kalki, an avatar of Hindu deity Vishnu in the Hindu eschatology, according to the Bhagavata Purana, and 3102 BC – traditionally thought to be the beginning of Kali Yuga after the Kurukshetra War, from the death of Krishna (the film being set 6,000 years into the Kali Yuga, the era of the asura/demon Kali).

=== Pre-production ===
Ashwin co-wrote the film's script along with Rutham Samar, Sai Madhav Burra and B. S. Sarawagna Kumar, in his second consecutive film with Samar and Burra after Mahanati. A muhurat pooja ceremony was held on 24 July 2021 at Ramoji Film City in Hyderabad with the presence of the film's cast and crew. The working title was revealed to have been changed to Project K the same day. Ashwin stated that the film needed high-end technology and futuristic vehicles to be developed for the film. Although they can be recreated using computer-generated imagery (CGI), the director opted to build these vehicles from scratch.

In March 2022, Ashwin requested businessman Anand Mahindra to provide technical support to build such type of vehicle. A few days later, Mahindra responded that their company Mahindra & Mahindra would assist the production team from their Mahindra Research Valley campus in Chennai. In July 2021, the makers erected a futuristic set at Ramoji Film City in Hyderabad where a significant portion of filming is expected to take place. A. R. Rahman had been initially approached, in August 2020, to compose music for the film but the talks fell out.

Ashwin retained most of his technicians, including composer Mickey J. Meyer, editor Kotagiri Venkateswara Rao, production designer Nithin Zihani Choudhary, cinematographer Dani Sanchez-Lopez, costume designers Thota Vijay Bhaskar, Shaleena Nathani and Sahithi Patha. However, Serbian cinematographer, Djordje Stojiljkovic, replaced Dani Sanchez-Lopez as the official cinematographer of the film. In February 2023, Santhosh Narayanan replaced Meyer as the composer. Andreas Nguyen was chosen as the stunt choreographer of the film. Singeetam Srinivasa Rao joined as a mentor, contributing elements of his planned script on Lord Krishna and providing creative inputs to the project.

=== Casting ===
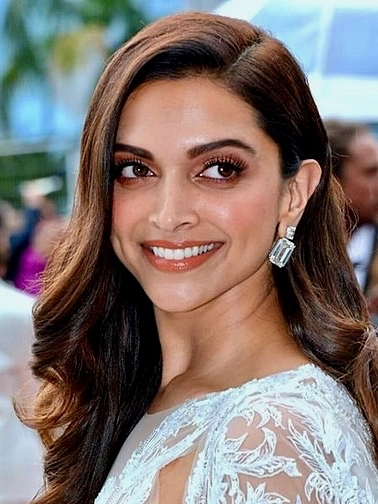
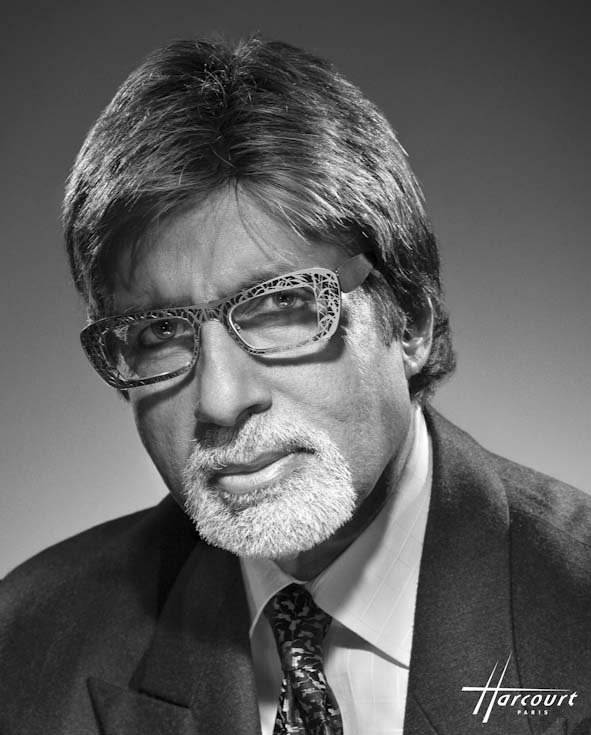
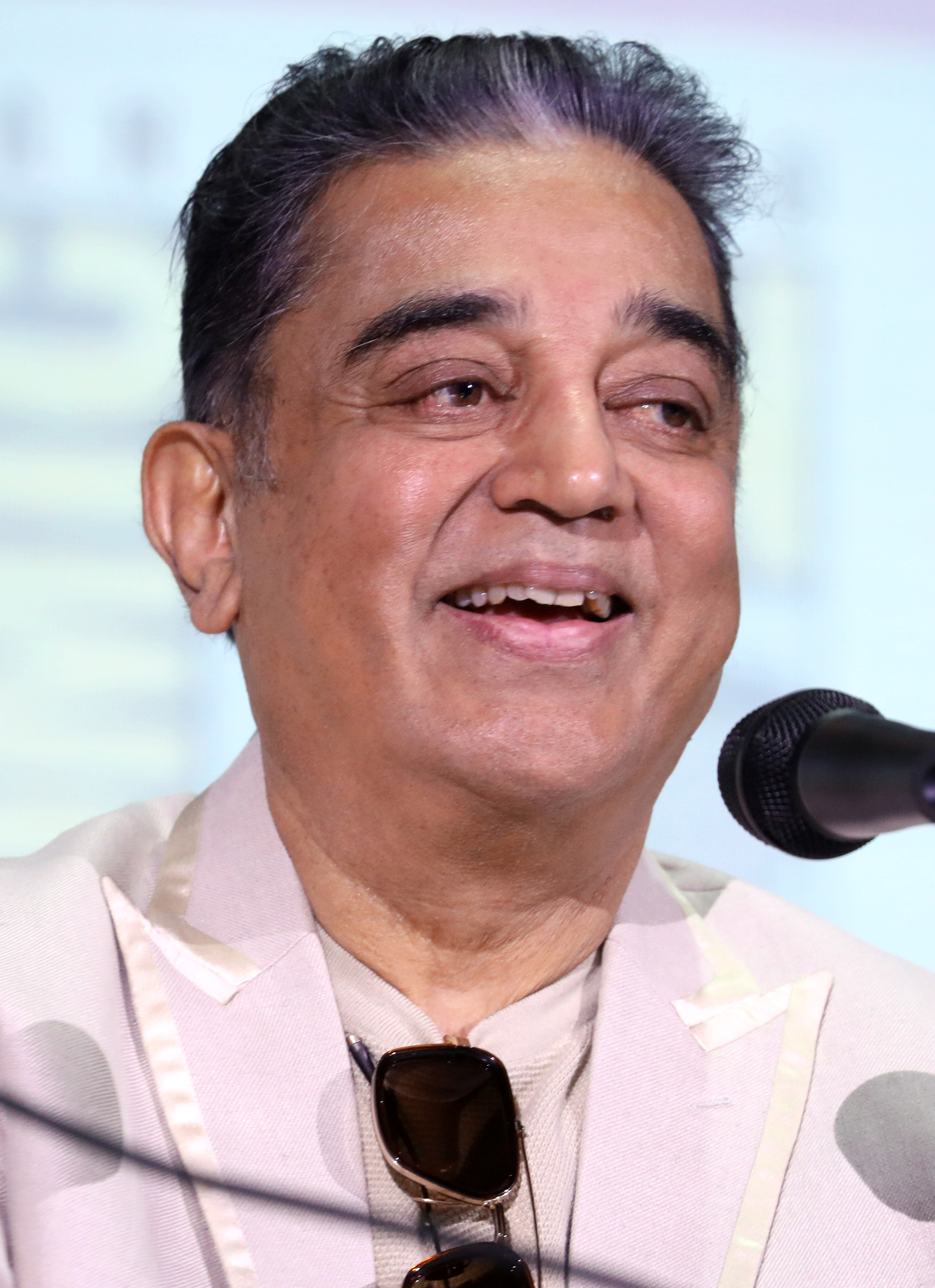
Deepika Padukone, Amitabh Bachchan, and Kamal Haasan play crucial roles in the film

Prabhas would sport long hair and beard, with reporters reminiscing his look in the film with Baahubali. Deepika Padukone was cast as the female lead, in her Telugu film debut despite having starred in the unreleased Love 4 Ever. Amitabh Bachchan was confirmed to play an important role, in his Telugu film debut as he had previously only made cameo appearances in Manam (2014) and Sye Raa Narasimha Reddy (2019). Ashwin stated that his role was "so important that his character's name [Ashwatthama] was the working title of an early draft". Kamal Haasan also joined the film in an important role, while Disha Patani was also cast in an important role. The film marks their return to Telugu cinema after Subha Sankalpam (1995) and Loafer (2015), respectively. (Note: While Cheekati Rajyam (2015) was his last Telugu film, his last straight Telugu film was Subha Sankalpam.)

Rajendra Prasad, Shobhana, Saswata Chatterjee, Brahmanandam, and Pasupathy were cast in important roles. Anna Ben made her Telugu debut with this film. Keerthy Suresh and Arjun Das appeared in voice roles respectively; former as Bujji and latter as Lord Krishna. Initially, Keerthy Suresh was offered another undisclosed role, but she rejected it and later accepted the voice-role. Harshith Malgireddy, Kavya Ramachandran, Ayaz Pasha, Anil George, Keya Nair, Vinay Kumar, Venkata Ramana, Hamish Boyd and Sanghawa Shin were present during the film's preliminary shooting schedule. Dulquer Salmaan, Vijay Deverakonda, Mrunal Thakur, S. S. Rajamouli, Ram Gopal Varma and K. V. Anudeep briefly had respective cameo appearances.

=== Filming ===
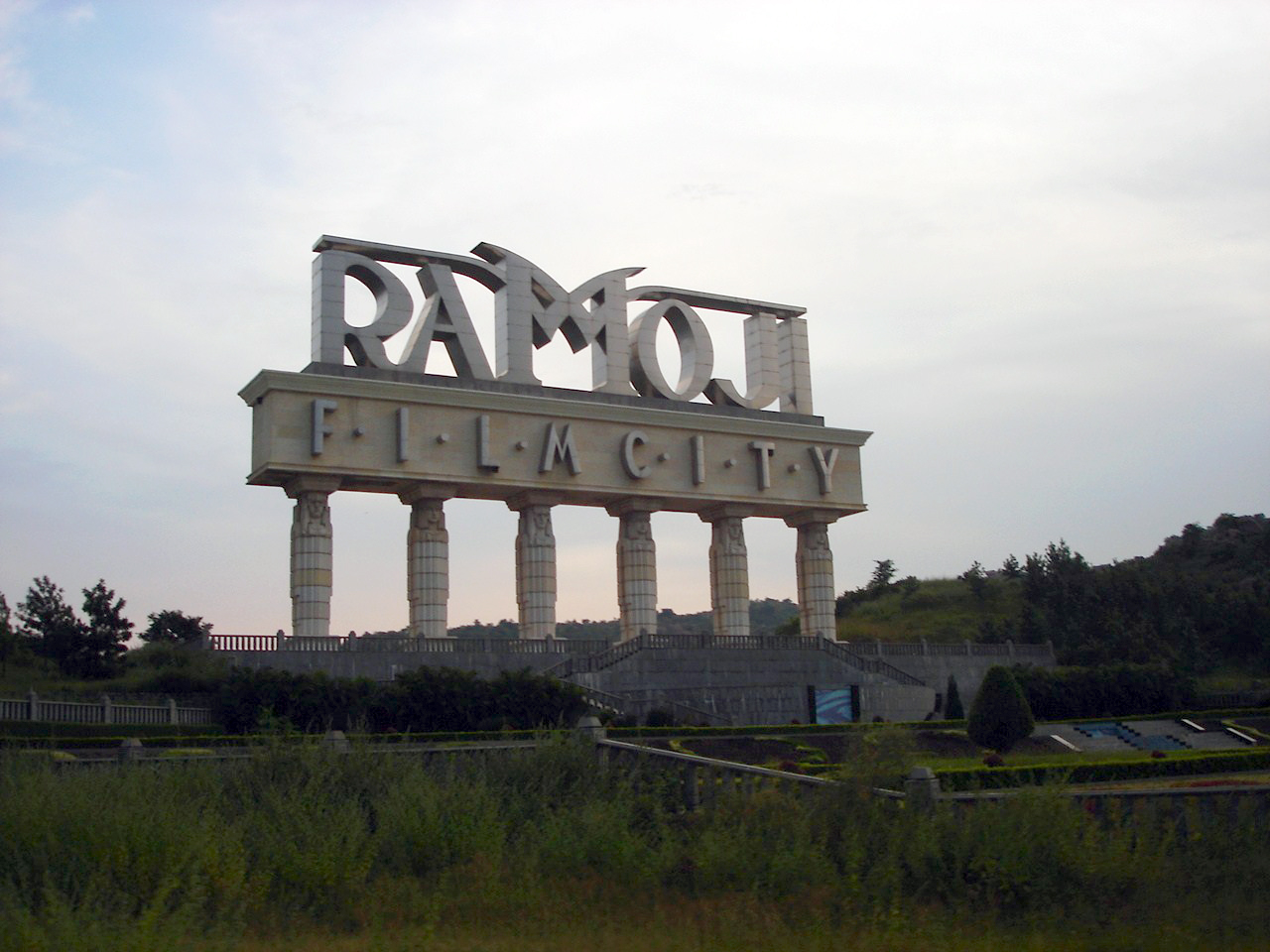
Ramoji Film City, where parts of the film were shot

Principal photography began with the first schedule on 24 July 2021, on the occasion of Guru Purnima, at Ramoji Film City in Hyderabad featuring Bachchan. Prabhas and Padukone joined the production in December 2021 and scenes featuring both the actors and Bachchan were shot. The second schedule of the shoot took place in February 2022. Instead of shooting the entire film in a single stretch, the team divided its 80–90 days of shoot into 7–8 days every month. This actually allowed the production team to take time and prepare the gadgets and props to be used in the film. Therefore, the production of the film was expected to take longer than usual. DIY Arri Alexa 65 camera was used to shoot the film, thus making it the first Indian film to use this technology.

Prabhas was expected to start filming his solo portions in April 2022, however, his knee surgery led to a delay of his upcoming projects including Salaar and Kalki 2898 AD. 90% of the shoot was done in sets built in Ramoji Film City. In June, Bachchan shot for a scene at Raidurg metro station. In July, Padukone and Prabhas shot for a car chase sequence in Hyderabad. Prabhas completed shooting the majority of his portions by the end of this schedule.

However, the film was still being shot in March 2023 when Bachchan injured his ribs and was advised to take rest in Mumbai. Around 70% of the filming was completed by June 2023. On 20 July 2023 at San Diego Comic-Con, Nag Ashwin revealed that while the film was mostly shot in Telugu, they were also reshooting some scenes in Hindi to make them more impactful. However, the Hindi version is reportedly mostly dubbed. (Note: The CBFC certificate of the Hindi version indicates that it is a dubbed version.) A romantic track featuring Prabhas and Disha Patani was filmed in Italy in March 2024 including at the Royal Palace of Caserta.

=== Post-production ===
The film features visual effects by the studios DNEG and The Embassy Visual Effects. These studios also collaborated with StealthWorks Taiwan, Folks VFX, Lola Visual Effects, Pixstone Images and Labyrinth.

DNEG and The Embassy created the film's environments and action sequences. The Embassy handled approximately 700 shots for the film and DNEG handled the principal visual effects and CGI shots for the film. Their tasks included creating a desert wasteland, futuristic vehicles for high-speed chases, utilising a broad range of VFX techniques, and creating 3 distinct worlds of: Kasi, Shambhala, and the Complex.

== Themes and influences ==
The film takes inspiration from Hinduism as Kalki is the tenth and final incarnation of Vishnu, who is a messiah during the Kali Yuga. Bhairava is an apparent reference to Kala Bhairava, an avatar of the Hindu deity Shiva. A place that appears in the film, Shambhala (near modern-day Varanasi), is prophesied to be the birthplace of Kalki in scriptures. This concept was later borrowed into the Kalachakra tradition of Tibetan Buddhism where it is described a mystical kingdom somewhere beyond the Himalayas and also as a state of mind.

Furthermore, director Nag Ashwin has openly stated that Star Wars had a huge influence on him growing up, and that it "is subconsciously a part of my aesthetic" in the making of the film. The character Luke was influenced by Luke Skywalker. The director also claimed that Guardians of the Galaxy (2014) served as an inspiration as well. Kamal Haasan showed Ashwin centenarian Tibetan monks and Dorian Gray for inspiration of the look of Yaskin.

== Music ==
The music of the film was composed by Santhosh Narayanan. The audio rights of the film were acquired by Saregama. The first single titled "Bhairava Anthem" was released on 16 June 2024. Three more singles— "Theme of Kalki", "Ta Takkara (Complex Song)" and "Hope of Shambala"—followed on 25 June 2024, 29 June 2024, and 4 July 2024 respectively. The entire soundtrack album was released on 10 July 2024.

== Marketing ==
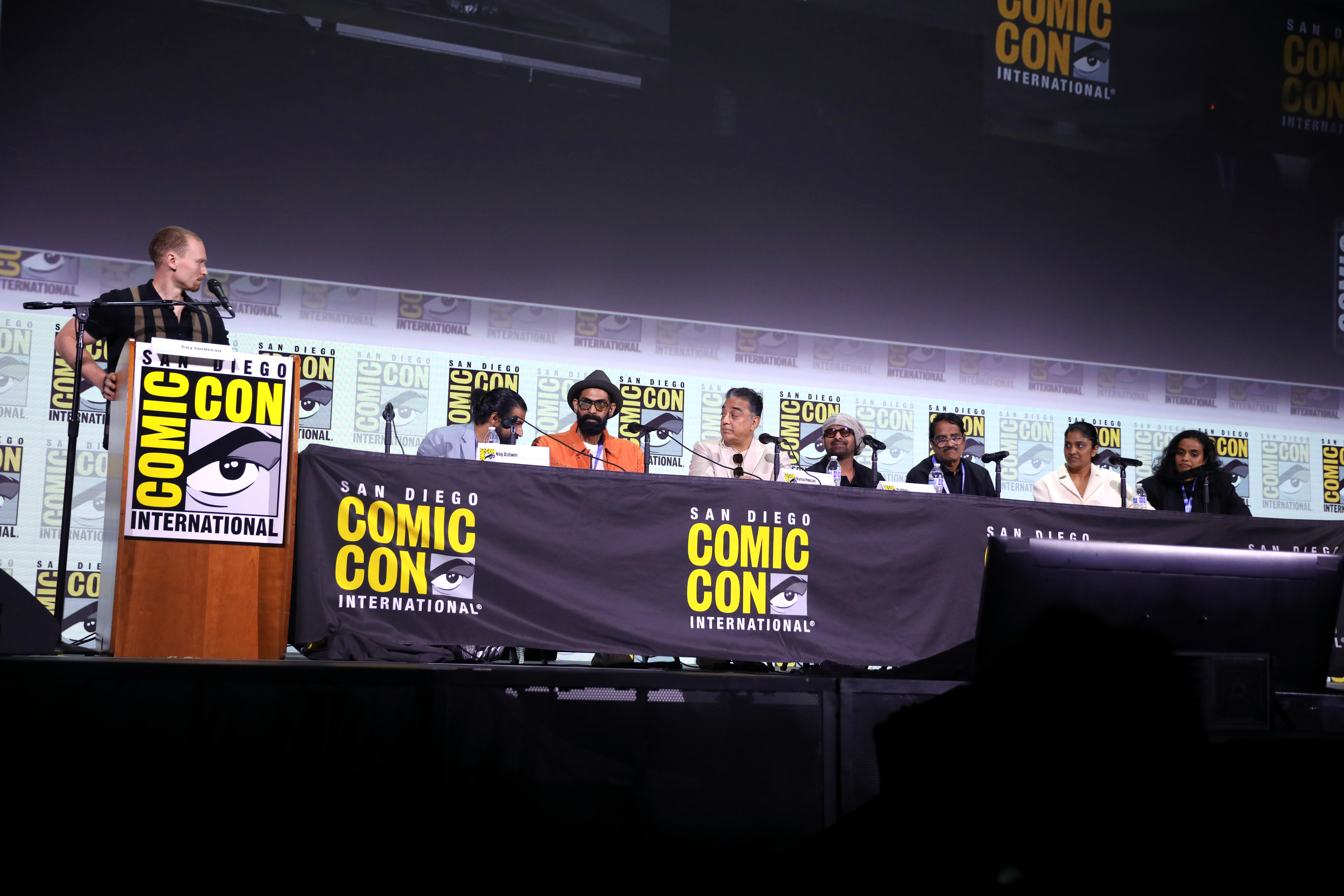
Kalki 2898 AD team at the 2023 San Diego Comic-Con

The film's first look was released on 19 July 2023. Kalki 2898 A.D became the first Indian film to be presented at San Diego Comic-Con's Hall-H on 20 July 2023. At the event, the makers unveiled the official title and a glimpse of the film, following the release of a limited comic strip panel depicting an important scene between "The Raiders" (followers of Kali) and Bhairava.

On the occasion of Maha Sivaratri, the makers released a poster revealing Prabhas's character as Bhairava. A new teaser introducing the character Ashwatthama was unveiled on 21 April 2024. Inspired by the immortal character from the ancient Indian epic Mahabharata, Ashwatthama was portrayed by Amitabh Bachchan. On 27 April, the makers announced the new release date with a poster featuring Prabhas, Amitabh Bachchan and Deepika Padukone. On 30 April 2024, Prabhas took fans of cinema and cricket by surprise as he appeared as Bhairava for an IPL promotional video during Lucknow Super Giants vs Mumbai Indians. On 2 May 2024, Amitabh Bachchan appeared in his character of Ashwatthama where he delivered a motivational speech to the Indian cricket team as they prepare for the ICC Men's T20 World Cup 2024.

On 22 May 2024, in an event in Ramoji Film City in Hyderabad, a teaser introducing Prabhas' Robot sidekick AI humanoid vehicle "Bujji" was released. Anand Mahindra wrote, "we are so proud of Nag Ashwin and his tribe of filmmakers who aren't afraid to think big," while he shared that the engineers at Mahindra Research Valley helped the Kalki 2898 AD team realise its vision for the futuristic vehicle. On 27 May 2024, the makers and Amazon Prime Video announced a two-part animated prelude, titled Bujji and Bhairava, which was released on the platform on 31 May 2024 as part of the Kalki Cinematic Universe. The official trailer of the film was released on 10 June 2024. Concept artists Sung Choi and Oliver Beck, alleged that the initial frames of the trailer used their artwork without permission or credits, the latter's from the artwork for Star Trek: Prodigy. On 19 June 2024, a prerelease event was held in Mumbai, with Prabhas, Amitabh Bachchan, Kamal Haasan, Deepika Padukone, Rana Daggubati, and the film's producers attending the event. The release-trailer of the film was released on 21 June 2024. The theme song of the film, "Theme of Kalki", was unveiled on the evening of 23 June 2024 in Lord Krishna's birthplace, Mathura, Uttar Pradesh, along the banks of the Yamuna river. Additionally, an interview conversation featuring Prabhas, Bachchan, Haasan, and Padukone, along with the producers, was also released on YouTube.

== Release ==
=== Theatrical ===
Kalki 2898 AD was released in Telugu, Hindi, Tamil, Malayalam and Kannada languages. The film was initially planned to be released in 2022, but was delayed to 9 May 2024 due to the COVID-19 pandemic and unfinished production works. It was, however, postponed again from 9 May to 27 June, owing to the 2024 Indian general election.

Pre-bookings started in the United States on 6 June 2024, three weeks before the film's release. Nearly 4,200 tickets were sold on the first day of pre-bookings with a collection of US$135 thousand. Pre-bookings started in the UK, Canada and in Germany on 11 June 2024, two weeks before the film's release. After the trailer was released, the advance booking for the film in the US crossed over US$760K. 20,000 tickets were sold for the film's premiere in the UK. Pre-bookings in the US crossed US$1 million in fewer days than S. S. Rajamouli's RRR (2022), thus becoming the fastest Indian film to achieve this feat.

The film was invited to 'Open Cinema' at the 29th Busan International Film Festival and was screened at the outdoor theatre in October 2024. It was featured at the 55th IFFI in the Indian Panorama Mainstream section.

=== Distribution ===
Annapurna Studios along with Swapna Cinema distributed the film across Andhra Pradesh and Telangana. Global Cinemas acquired the Nizam area distribution rights while Dulquer Salmaan's Wayfarer Films acquired the distribution rights in Kerala for ₹6 crores. KVN Productions acquired the distribution rights in Karnataka for ₹30 crores, while the distribution rights for North India were acquired by Anil Thadani of AA Films for ₹100 crores. The Tamil Nadu distribution rights were acquired by Sri Lakshmi Movies. Prathyangira Cinemas along with AA Creations acquired the distribution rights across North America.

=== Prerelease business ===
According to Indian trade sources, the prerelease business of Kalki 2898 AD included the sale of satellite, digital, music, and theatrical rights, with ₹390 crore earned from theatrical rights. The film's overseas distribution rights were acquired by The Village Groupe for ₹80 crore.

=== Home media ===
The post-theatrical digital streaming rights were acquired by Amazon Prime Video for ₹200 crores, while Netflix acquired the rights for ₹175 crores. It premiered on Amazon Prime Video on 22 August 2024 in Telugu along with the Tamil, Malayalam and Kannada dubbed versions, while the Hindi dubbed version was released simultaneously on Netflix. In the OTT version, around 6 minutes of footage was trimmed down so as to streamline the pacing of the film. The satellite rights were acquired by Zee Entertainment Enterprises.

== Reception ==
=== Box office ===
Kalki 2898 AD grossed ₹180 crore worldwide on its opening day, which was the third highest first day gross for an Indian film, with over ₹95 crore gross from India. The film recorded the biggest opening for an Indian film in 2024. The film almost crossed ₹250 crore in two days, earning ₹149.3 crore from India. Kalki 2898 AD debuted in third place at the worldwide box office, behind Inside Out 2 and A Quiet Place: Day One in their opening weekends. It grossed an estimated ₹484 crore worldwide from its opening weekend of four days, and ₹800 crore in 11 days of release. It became the fourth highest-grossing Indian film of all time in India, surpassing Shah Rukh Khan's Jawan (2023) in 40 days. During its theatrical run of over 50 days, the film has grossed est.₹1,180 crore worldwide against a production budget of ₹600 crore.

=== Critical response ===
While Deccan Chronicle mentioned mixed reviews and WION wrote that the film "failed to impress", India Today commented that the reviews were positive. On the review aggregator website Rotten Tomatoes, 77% of 39 critics' reviews are positive, with an average rating of 7.1/10. The website's consensus reads: "A colourful spectacle that competes with Hollywood blockbusters while retaining its own distinctive flavour, Kalki 2898 AD marks a rousing breakthrough in Tollywood sci-fi cinema." Metacritic, which uses a weighted average, assigned the film a score of 65 out of 100, based on 8 critics, indicating "generally favorable" reviews.

A critic for Bollywood Hungama rated the film 4 stars out of 5 and wrote, "On the whole, Kalki 2898 AD stands as a grandiose spectacle that depicts the future like never before in Indian cinema and also merges mythology seamlessly, thereby delivering a unique experience to the audiences." Chirag Sehgal of News18 gave 4/5 stars and wrote, "It combines action with visual spectacle and mythology with technology and science – which makes the film worth watching." Goutam S of Pinkvilla gave 4/5 stars and wrote, "If you are a lover of films which has a grand scale, [sic] epic narration, amazing visuals, groundbreaking performances, and unbelievable storytelling, then surely watch this feast of a movie in the screens near you." The Guardian gave a rating of 4 out of 5, describing it as a "maximalist sci-fi epic that mixes Mahabharata with Mad Max." Janani K of India Today gave 3.5/5 stars and wrote, "Like Baahubali, Kalki 2898 AD ends on a cliffhanger and paves the way for a new cinematic world altogether. The surprise cameos, even though leaked by Prabhas himself, were perfect theatrical moments." Collider in its review said, "Kalki 2898 AD is a unique sci-fi epic that successfully combines supernatural elements with cutting-edge technology", while appreciating performances of the lead cast particularly Prabhas and Bachchan, and the screenplay by Nag Ashwin.

Sukanya Verma of Rediff rated the film 3.5 out of 5 stars and wrote, "Prabhas may be the face of Kalki 2898 AD's heroics but the real bang for your buck is delivered in Amitabh Bachchan's indefatigable energy providing Kalki's biggest wolf-whistle moments." Ronek Kotecha of The Times of India gave 3/5 stars and wrote, "The film's visual quality is so high that it overshadows many of its obvious flaws by engaging the audience into the atmospherics of the make-believe world of Kasi and the Complex." Sashidar Adivi of Times Now gave 3/5 stars and wrote, "Overall, the film is a VFX wonder. The setup and the universe are brilliant, however, the writing needs introspection." Avad Mohammed of OTTPlay gave 3/5 stars and wrote, "On the whole, Kalki 2898 AD is a technically brilliant film with never-before-seen visuals in an Indian film. The presence of A-listers and amazing action episodes make for a big-screen watch. Just ignore the slow pace."

Bunbury of Deadline Hollywood wrote, "It is terrific, cathartic fun – and, given that Vishnu's next avatar has apparently yet to be born, what is described in the marketing blurbs as the Kalki Cinematic Universe can be expected to rage, burn and rip-roar for a good few editions yet, leaving audiences happily flattened with exhaustion" and praised Nag Ashwin's work. B. V. S. Prakash of Deccan Chronicle gave 3/5 stars and wrote, "Director Nag Ashwin had a reason to cast big guns like Amitabh and Kamal to carry unthinkable roles and it paid off." Saibal Chatterjee of NDTV gave 2.5/5 stars and wrote, "It falls back on the sheer sweep of mounting and execution to make up for what lacks in terms of the writing." Sangeetha Devi Dundoo of The Hindu wrote, "Despite these shortcomings, Kalki is a brave new attempt that deserves big cheers." Neeshita Nyayapathi of Hindustan Times wrote, "Nag Ashwin's dystopian film might not be flawless, but it's gutsy and intriguing enough to be watched on-screen."

== Awards and nominations ==
Name of the award ceremony, year presented, award category, nominee(s) of the award, and the result of the nomination
Award ceremony	Date of ceremony (Note: Date is linked to the article about the awards held that year, wherever possible.)	Category	Nominee(s)/work(s)	Result	Ref.
SIIMA	5 September 2025	Best Film - Telugu	Vyjayanthi Movies	Won	
SIIMA	5 September 2025	Best Supporting Actor (male) - Telugu	Amitabh Bachchan	Won	
SIIMA	5 September 2025	Best Supporting Actor (Female) - Telugu	Anna Ben	Won	
SIIMA	5 September 2025	Best Negative Role Actor - Telugu	Kamal Haasan	Won	
SIIMA	5 September 2025	Best Director - Telugu	Nag Ashwin	Nominated	
SIIMA	5 September 2025	Best Cinematographer - Telugu	Djordje Stojiljkovic	Nominated	
SIIMA	5 September 2025	Best Actor - Telugu	Prabhas	Nominated	
SIIMA	5 September 2025	Best Actress - Telugu	Deepika Padukone	Nominated	
SIIMA	5 September 2025	Best Comedian - Telugu	Brahmanandam	Nominated	
SIIMA	5 September 2025	Best Music Director - Telugu	Santhosh Narayanan	Nominated	
Telangana Gaddar Film Awards	14 June 2025	Best Feature Film	C. Aswini Dutt; Nag Ashwin	Won	
Telangana Gaddar Film Awards	14 June 2025	Best Director	Nag Ashwin	Won	
Telangana Gaddar Film Awards	14 June 2025	Best Art Director	Adnithin Zihani Choudhary	Won	
Telangana Gaddar Film Awards	14 June 2025	Best Costume Designer	Archana Rao; Ajay Kumar	Won	
National Film Awards	18 July 2026	Best Popular Film Providing Wholesome Entertainment	Kalki 2898 AD	Won	

== Future ==
In late May 2024, it was reported that the film would have a sequel. On 26 June 2024, a day prior to the film's release, Ashwin commented on Kalki 2898 AD: Part 2 and stated that it would begin three years later. During the mid-credits, it was revealed to be part of a media franchise named Kalki Cinematic Universe which had earlier been teased in Bujji & Bhairava, an animated series released before the film and serving as its "prelude".

On 29 June 2024, producer C. Aswani Dutt announced that 60% of the filming for Kalki 2898 AD: Part 2 has been completed, with several major segments still remaining to be shot. On 18 September 2025, the producers announced that they have officially parted ways with Deepika Padukone on the sequel owing to undisclosed reasons. Padukone exited the sequel, and her role is expected to be recast. Principal photography for the sequel began in 24 February 2026.

== See also ==
- 1000 Crore Club – Indian films grossing over 10 billion rupees
- List of science fiction films of the 2020s
- Science fiction films in India
