= Neverending Past =

2018 film

- Film poster
- Directed by: Andro Martinović
- Written by: Andro Martinović
- Produced by: Ivan Djurovic; Andro Martinović; Lazar Ristovski
- Starring: Lazar Ristovski
- Cinematography: Radoslav Vladic
- Edited by: Andrija Zafranovic
- Production companies: Artikulacija; Zillion Film
- Release date: 1 September 2018 (Montreal)
- Running time: 77 minutes
- Countries: Montenegro; Serbia
- Language: Serbian

Neverending Past (Montenegrin: Između dana i noći) is a 2018 Montenegrin-Serbian anthology mystery drama film written and directed by Andro Martinović. It was selected as the Montenegrin entry for the Best International Feature Film at the 92nd Academy Awards, but it was not nominated.

== Plot ==
Three stories examine relationships of fathers and sons. They span three eras: near the end of World War II, during the fall of the Berlin Wall, and in the early 1990s after the breakup of Yugoslavia.

== Cast ==
- Lazar Ristovski
- Tihomir Stanic
- Srdjan Grahovac
- Marko Bacovic
- Jovan Krivokapic
- Dubravka Drakic

== See also ==
- List of submissions to the 92nd Academy Awards for Best International Feature Film
- List of Montenegrin submissions for the Academy Award for Best International Feature Film
