= Bojan Žirović =

Serbian actor

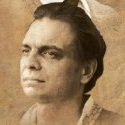
- Born: 26 January 1971 (age 55); Zrenjanin, SR Serbia, Yugoslavia
- Occupation: Actor
- Years active: 1991-present

Bojan Žirović (born 26 January 1971) is a Serbian actor. He appeared in more than forty films since 1991.

== Selected filmography ==
Year	Title	Role	Notes
2009	St. George Shoots the Dragon		
2010	Montevideo, God Bless You!		
2012	Death of a Man in the Balkans		
2020	Dara in Jasenovac		
2023	Supermarket		
