= Dubravka Vukotić =

Montenegrin actress

Dubravka Drakić (nee Vukotić) (Дубравка Вукотић) (born on June 25, 1976, in Titograd (now Podgorica), Montenegro, Yugoslavia) is a Montenegrin actress.

She performed for the city theatre of Podgorica from 1998 to 2014.

She has two children: daughter Ines, and son Filip.

== Filmography ==
- Home (2026)
- Breasts (2020)
- Neverending Past (2018)
- Pogled sa Ajfelovog tornja (2005)
- Opet pakujemo majmune (2004) .... Landlady
- Mješoviti Brak (2003) TV Series .... Bojana, Milun's wife
- U ime oca i sina (1999) .... Kamenodoljanka
