= Lazar Ristovski =

Serbian actor, director, producer and writer

- Лазар Ристовски
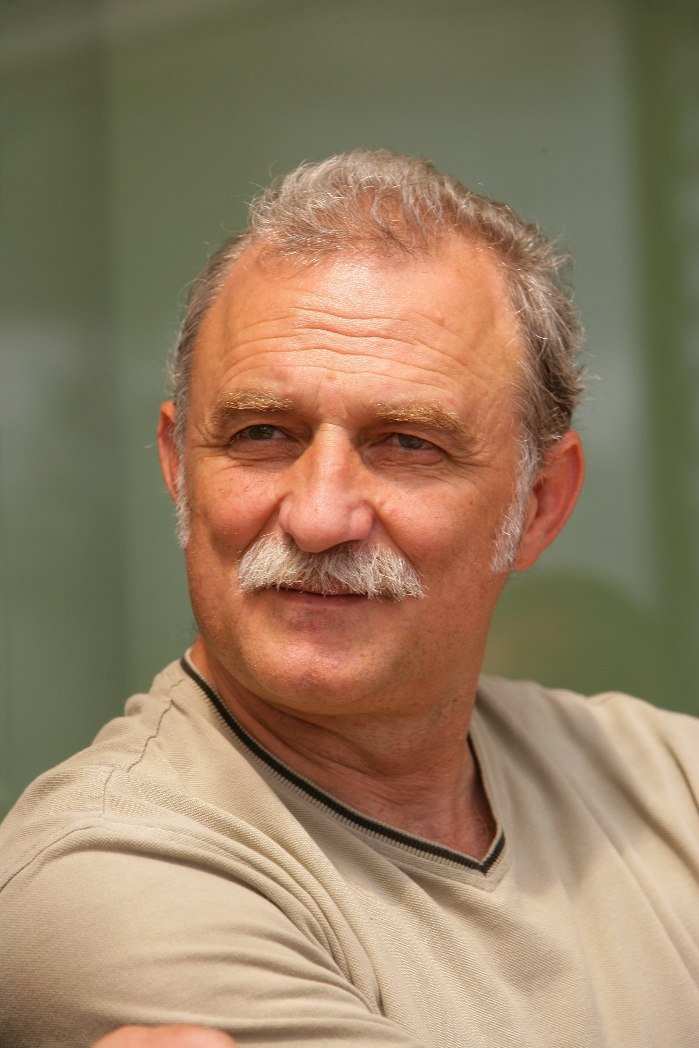
- Lazar Ristovski in February 2011

Member of the National Assembly
- In office 1 August 2022 – 9 August 2022

Personal details
- Born: 26 October 1952 (age 73) Ravno Selo, PR Serbia, FPR Yugoslavia
- Party: Independent
- Spouse: Danica Ristovski (m. 1980; div. 2022)
- Children: Jovan, Petar
- Occupation: Actor, director, producer and writer
- Nickname: Laza

Lazar "Laza" Ristovski (Serbian Cyrillic: Лазар Ристовски, born 26 October 1952) is a Serbian former actor, director, producer and writer. He has appeared on stage about 4,000 times, and starred in over 90 films and 30 TV series, mostly in lead roles. He briefly served as a member of the National Assembly from 1 August 2022 until his resignation on 9 August 2022.

== Biography ==
He was born on 26 October 1952, in Ravno Selo village, part of Vrbas, SR Serbia, FPR Yugoslavia (modern Serbia), into a family of Yugoslav colonists, his father being born in Macedonia and was from Gugjakovo and his mother in Montenegro. He graduated from the Faculty of Dramatic Arts of the University of Belgrade as an actor.

In 1999, The White Suit an auteur film by Ristovski (director, writer, lead actor, and producer) was at the Cannes Film Festival in the Critics Week program. The White Suit was the Serbian entry for the 72nd Academy Awards.

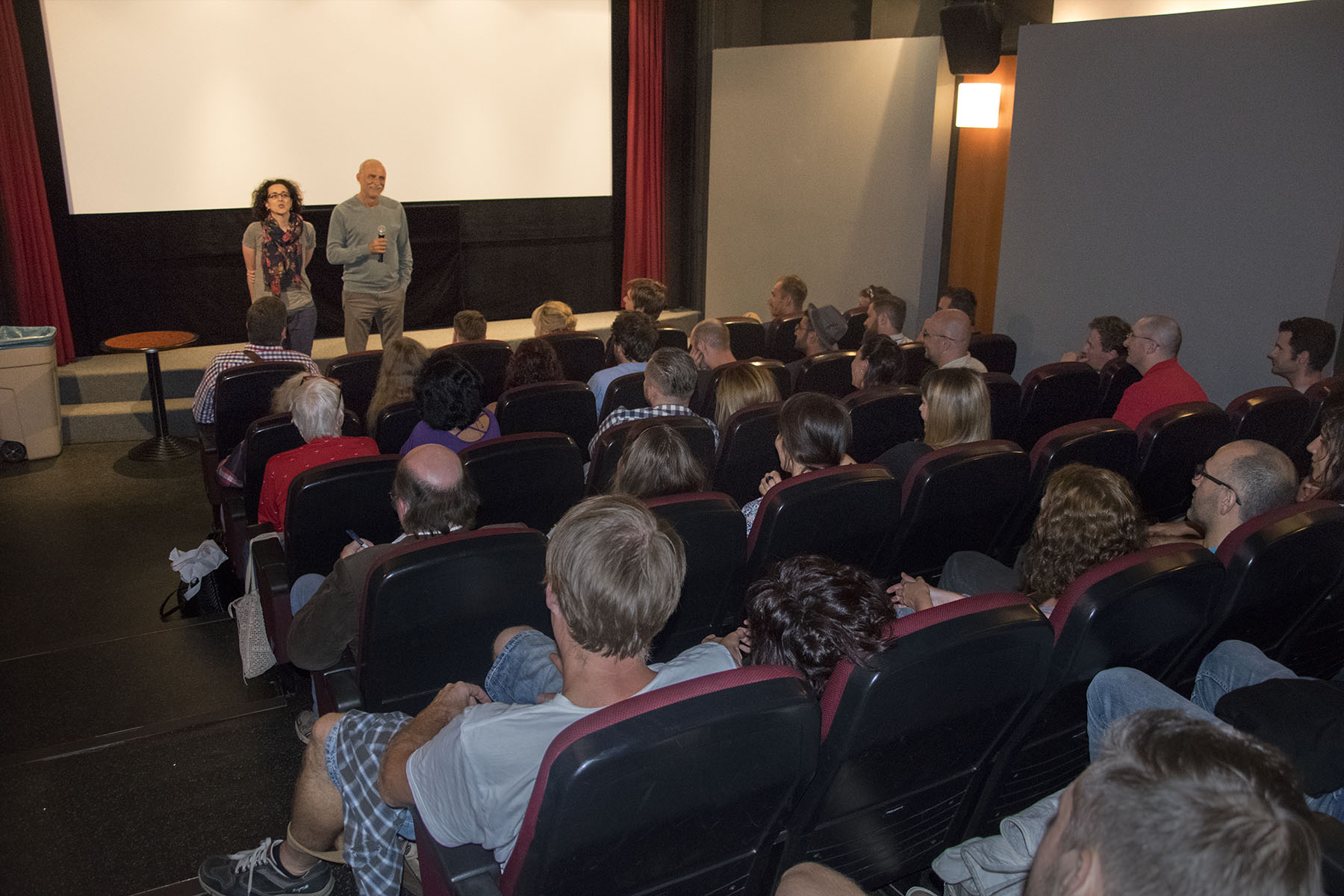
Lazar Ristovski presenting the film Train Driver's Diary at the Prague Independent Film Festival in 2017

Lazar Ristovski is the sole owner of Zillion Film Company

In 2006, he made a small appearance in the James Bond film Casino Royale. He played Caruso in the 2004 movie King of Thieves. He starred as Đorđe in the award-winning 2009 film St. George Shoots the Dragon.

Ristovski has achieved his "Hollywood dream" by acting in the indie movie Along the Roadside. He most recently played Russian president-elect and former Army General Arkady Fedorov in Pierce Brosnan's movie The November Man which came out in 2014.

He played in movies outside of Serbia: The Second Wife and Auf kurze Distanz.

In 2016, he starred in and produced the film Train Driver's Diary which was the Serbian entry for the Best Foreign Language Film at the 89th Academy Awards. The film won three awards at the 2017 Prague Independent Film Festival – the Grand Prix, Best Actor (Lazar Ristovski), and Best Feature Film.

Ristovski is the organizer of the Ravno Selo Film Festival which was held for the first time in June 2017.

He is also the author of four books; Belo odelo (The White Suit), Kako sam dobio Oskara (How I Got an Oscar), Jednostavne priče (Simple Stories) and Ulična akademija (Street Academy).

== Selected filmography ==
| Year | Title | Role |
|---|---|---|
| 1977 | Hajka | Ivan |
| 1978 | Kvar | psihijatar Savić |
| 1980 | Svetozar Marković | Svetozar Marković |
| 1983 | Igmanski marš | Josip Broz Tito |
| 1984 | Zadarski memento | Krševan Stipčević |
| 1985 | Jazol | Nikola |
| 1988 | The Way Steel Was Tempered | Leo |
| 1988 | The Bizarre Country | Putnik |
| 1990 | Granica | Topić |
| 1990 | Hajde da se volimo 3 | Miloje |
| 1991 | The Original of the Forgery | Pavle |
| 1992 | Tito and Me | Raja |
| 1993 | Vizantijsko plavo | Aranđel |
| 1995 | Underground | Crni (Blacky) / Actor playing Blacky |
| 1997 | Rage | Kovač |
| 1997 | Balkanska pravila | Matori |
| 1998 | Cabaret Balkan | The Boxer Who Takes the Train |
| 1998 | The Second Wife | Fosco |
| 1998 | Goodbye, 20th Century! | Santa Claus |
| 1999 | Belo odelo | Savo / Vuko Tiodorović |
| 2001 | Boomerang | Bobi |
| 2003 | Mali svet | Stariji vodnik Ras |
| 2004 | King of Thieves | Caruso |
| 2004 | Falling in the Paradise | Ljubiša Kundačina |
| 2004 | Midwinter Night's Dream | Lazar |
| 2005 | Dobro uštimani mrtvaci | Ruždija Kučuk |
| 2006 | Krojačeva tajna | Pukovnik |
| 2006 | Tomorrow Morning | Zdravko |
| 2006 | Optimisti | Professor Gavrilo / Simon / Pokojni Ratomir / Gazda Pera / Aleksa Pantić |
| 2006 | Casino Royale | Kaminofsky |
| 2007 | S. O. S. – Spasite nase duše | Gvozden |
| 2008 | Sonetàula | Egidio Malune |
| 2009 | St. George Shoots the Dragon | Đorđe žandar |
| 2009 | Đavolja varoš | Rajko Zorić |
| 2009 | Honeymoons | Verin stric |
| 2011 | Beli lavovi | Dile |
| 2013 | The Priest's Children | Biskup |
| 2013 | Along the Roadside | Milutin |
| 2014 | The November Man | Arkady Federov |
| 2015 | We Will Be the World Champions | Josip Broz Tito |
| 2015 | Za kralja i otadžbinu | |
| 2016 | On the Other Side | Žarko |
| 2016 | Train Driver's Diary | Ilija |
| 2018 | King Peter of Serbia | King Peter I |
| 2018 | The Man Who Bought the Moon | |
| 2019 | King Peter of Serbia | King Peter I |
| 2019 | Neverending Past | Covek koji trazi mrtvog sina |
| 2019 | Leeches | Stjepan Stroh |
| 2021 | Dream Team | Ilija Ika Srdić |
| 2023 | Mind Tunnel | Miodrag Malić |
| 2024 | Dream Team 2 | Ilija Ika Srdić |
| 2024 | Saligia | Horovođa |
