= Honey Night =

2015 film

- Film poster
- Directed by: Ivo Trajkov
- Written by: Ivo Trajkov
- Produced by: Robert Jazadziski; Branislav Srdic; Jordi Niubo; Pavel Rejholec
- Starring: Nikola Ristanovski
- Cinematography: Andrija Zafranovic
- Music by: Toni Kitanovski
- Distributed by: Kaval Film
- Release date: 17 April 2015
- Running time: 89 minutes
- Countries: Macedonia; Czech Republic; Slovenia
- Language: Macedonian

Honey Night (Macedonian: Медена ноќ, romanized: Medena noḱ) is a 2015 Macedonian drama film directed by Ivo Trajkov. The film was selected as the Macedonian entry for the Best Foreign Language Film at the 88th Academy Awards but it was not nominated.

== Cast ==
- Nikola Ristanovski as Nikola
- Verica Nedeska as Anna
- Igor Angelov as Andov
- Boris Damovski as Boris Pasternak
- Nina Janković as Nina
- Sabina Ajrula as Cveta

== See also ==
- List of submissions to the 88th Academy Awards for Best Foreign Language Film
- List of Macedonian submissions for the Academy Award for Best Foreign Language Film
