= Iskra (film) =

2017 film

- Film poster
- Directed by: Gojko Berkuljan
- Written by: Gojko Berkuljan
- Starring: Mirko Vlahovic; Jelena Simic
- Release date: 2 August 2017
- Running time: 81 minutes
- Country: Montenegro
- Language: Serbian

Iskra is a 2017 Montenegrin drama film directed by Gojko Berkuljan. It was selected as the Montenegrin entry for the Best Foreign Language Film at the 91st Academy Awards, but it was not nominated.

== Cast ==
- Jelena Simic as Iskra

== See also ==
- List of submissions to the 91st Academy Awards for Best Foreign Language Film
- List of Montenegrin submissions for the Academy Award for Best Foreign Language Film
