= Djordje Stojiljkovic =

Serbian cinematographer

Đorđe Stojiljković
- Occupation: Cinematographer
- Notable work: Kalki 2898 AD (2024)
- Website: djordjestojiljkovic.com

Djordje Stojiljkovic (Serbian Cyrillic: Ђорђе Стојиљковић) is a Serbian cinematographer and visual effects artist.

== Biography ==
Born and raised in Vlasotince, Serbia, he developed an early interest in cinematography, by helping his father, who worked as an event photographer and cinematographer.

He began his career creating short films, music videos and television-style documentaries. He taught himself editing and the basics of VFX before enrolling into the Faculty of Drama Arts in Belgrade to study cinematography.

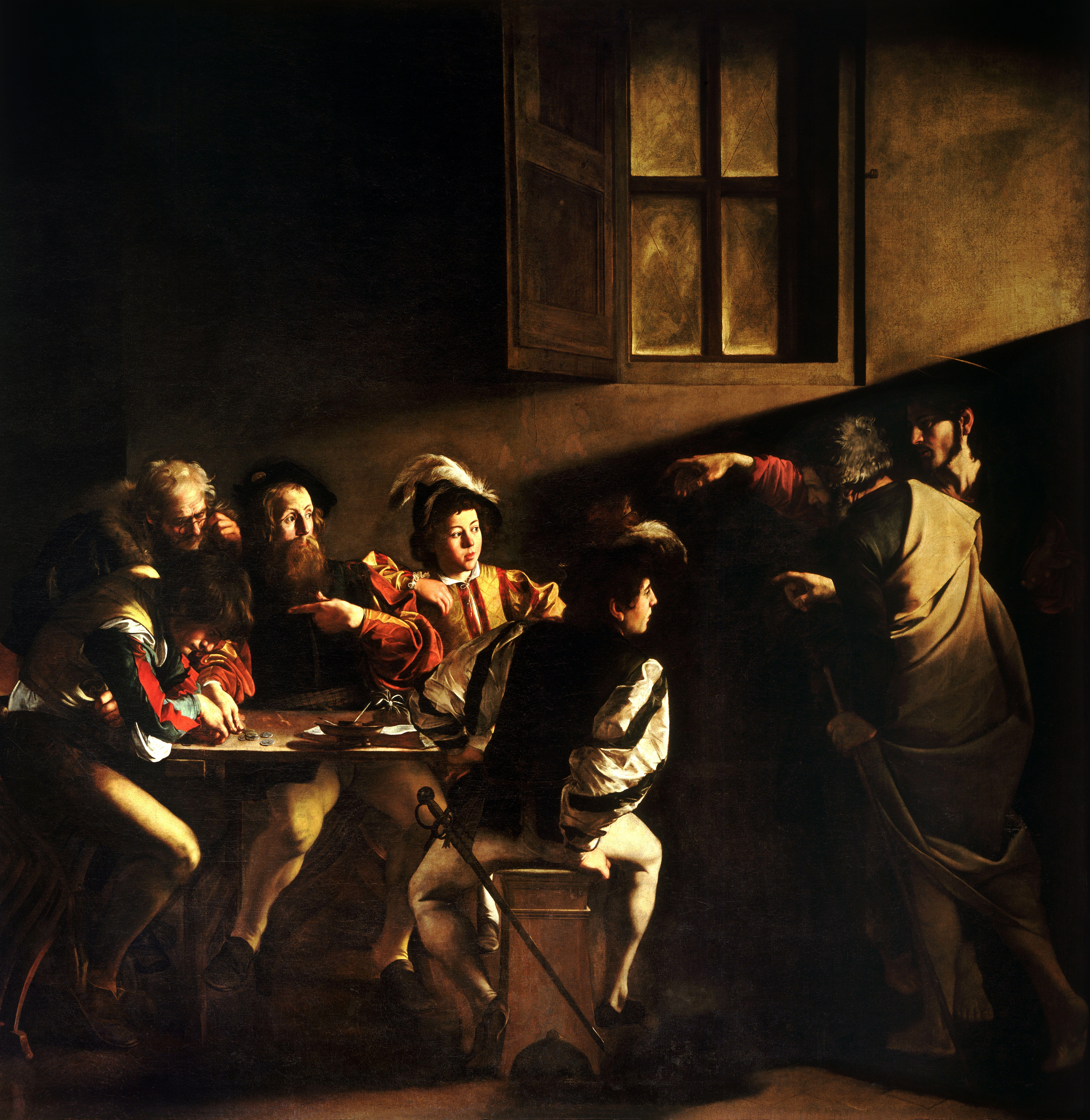
Djordje has cited the works of Caravaggio (The Calling of Saint Matthew, circa 1599–1600, pictured) as an influence

His work on Kalki 2898 AD involved creating various unique worlds. One of Stojiljkovic's inspirations is Italian painter Caravaggio, whose lighting atmospheres influenced his work. He and his gaffer, Zoran, created lighting inspired by Caravaggio's works.

Stojiljkovic is based in Belgrade.

== Filmography ==
Key
†	Denotes films that have not yet been released

Year	Film	Language	Notes	Ref.
2017	Pusti me da nadjem srcu lek	Serbian	Short feature film	
2019	Rani Rani Rani	Hindi-English		
2021	Ashman	Arabic		
2022	Monk Arsenije	Serbian	Documentary	
2022	Sophia	Serbian		
2024	Kalki 2898 AD	Telugu	Cameo	
2024	The Tower of Strength	Serbo-Croatian		
2024	Izolacija †	Serbian		
