= The Tower of Strength =

2024 film by Nikola Vukčević

- Promotional poster
- Montenegrin: Obraz
- Directed by: Nikola Vukčević
- Screenplay by: Ana Vujadinović; Melina Pota Koljević
- Based on: "Obraz (Legenda o Nuru Doki)" by Zuvdija Hodžić
- Produced by: Milorad Radenović; Nevena Savić; Ivica Vidanović; Christoph Thoke
- Starring: Edon Rizvanolli; Elez Adžović; Aleksandar Radulović; Vuk Bulajić
- Cinematography: Djordje Stojiljkovic
- Edited by: Olga Toni; Nikola Vukčević
- Music by: Dušan Maksimovski
- Production companies: Galileo Production; Cinnamon Production; Embrio Production; Progressive Films; Mogador Film
- Release date: 7 November 2024 (FilmFestival Cottbus)
- Running time: 95 minutes
- Countries: Montenegro; Serbia; Croatia; Germany
- Languages: Montenegrin/Serbian; Albanian

The Tower of Strength (Serbian: Obraz) is a 2024 biographical drama film directed by Nikola Vukčević. The script inspired by an anthology story by academician Zuvdija Hodžić, is written by Ana Vujadinović and Melina Pota Koljević. The film complete with a humanistic message is set around World War II in Yugoslavia. It follows a Christian child who escapes an Albanian SS division attack that destroyed his village and killed his parents, and a Muslim Albanian stranger, Nuredin Doka, with whom he takes shelter.

The film had its world premiere at the FilmFestival Cottbus on 7 November 2024, in the Feature Film Competition, where it competed for Main prize for the best film. It was selected as the Montenegrin entry for the Best International Feature Film at the 98th Academy Awards, but it was not nominated.

== Cast ==
- Edon Rizvanolli as Nuredin Doka
- Elez Adžović as Mehmet
- Alban Ukaj as Sokol Gjonaj
- Aleksandar Radulović as Abid
- Selman Jusufi as Nuredin's father
- Vuk Bulajić as Petar
- Branimir Popović as an army commander
- Nikola Ristanovski as village judge

== Production ==
In 2018, The Film Centre of Montenegro announced the funding of €20,000 for project development, for the film. In 2019, the film again received a fund of €120,000 from Montenegro for project development. In November 2023, Industry@Tallinn & Baltic Event in its International Works in Progress section granted €7,000, consisting of €6,000 worth of services by Studio Beep and a €1,000 as travel allowance to the film.

== Release ==
The Tower of Strength was presented in the Out of Competition section at the Cairo International Film Festival on 16 November 2024. Later on 26 November it had its Asian premiere at the 55th International Film Festival of India.

On 20 March 2025, it competed in Balkan Competition section of the Sofia International Film Festival.

On 2 July 2025, it was screened in Location Denied section of the Ischia Film Festival.

The film competed in the Awards Buzz – Best International Feature Film section of the 37th Palm Springs International Film Festival on 3 January 2026.

== Reception ==
Marko Stojiljković of Cineuropa reviewing the film at the Cairo International Film Festival, described the film as "a very old-fashioned piece of cinema, for better or for worse." He noted that the screenplay, written by Ana Vujadinović and Melina Pota Koljević with assistance from director Vukčević, occasionally felt "over-written, literal and theatrical". However, Stojiljković praised the cast for uplifting the film, highlighting Edon Rizvanolli, Alban Ukaj, and Aleksandar Radulović in the lead roles, as well as Selman Jusufi, Branimir Popović, and Nikola Ristanovski in supporting performances. Stojiljković observed that the direction employed "broad strokes," including Dušan Maksimovski's ethnic-sounding score and Đorđe Stojiljković's visually appealing cinematography. The film's commitment to period authenticity was also commended, with attention to detail evident in its production and costume design, and choice of locations. Concluding his review Stojiljković described the film as "a tight piece of cinema that evokes the traditional genres of a war movie and a western, without ever over-using the genre approach to the detriment of the drama at the film’s core."

== Accolades ==
Award	Date of ceremony	Category	Recipient	Result	Ref.
Jaipur International Film Festival	17 January 2025	Best Cinematography Award	Djordje Stojiljkovic	Won	

== See also ==
- List of submissions to the 98th Academy Awards for Best International Feature Film
- List of Montenegrin submissions for the Academy Award for Best International Feature Film
