= The Kids from the Marx and Engels Street =

2014 film

- Film poster
- Montenegrin: Dječaci iz Ulice Marksa i Engelsa
- Directed by: Nikola Vukčević
- Written by: Nikola Vukčević
- Starring: Momčilo Otašević; Goran Bogdan; Ana Sofrenović; Emir Hadžihafizbegović
- Release date: 5 August 2014
- Running time: 90 minutes
- Country: Montenegro
- Language: Montenegrin

The Kids from the Marx and Engels Street (Montenegrin: Dječaci iz Ulice Marksa i Engelsa) is a 2014 Montenegrin drama film directed by Nikola Vukčević. It was selected as the Montenegrin entry for the Best Foreign Language Film at the 87th Academy Awards, but was not nominated.

== Cast ==
- Momčilo Otašević as Stanko
- Goran Bogdan as Stanko
- Ana Sofrenović
- Emir Hadžihafizbegović as Potpara
- Branka Stanić
- Filip Đuretić as Vojo
- Anđela Mićanović
- Nebojša Glogovac
- Branimir Popović
- Mladen Vujović

== See also ==
- List of submissions to the 87th Academy Awards for Best Foreign Language Film
- List of Montenegrin submissions for the Academy Award for Best Foreign Language Film
