= Branimir Popović =

Montenegrin actor and politician

- Бранимир Поповић
- Born: 17 February 1967 (age 59); Titograd, SR Montenegro, SFR Yugoslavia
- Citizenship: Montenegro
- Education: Academy of Performing Arts
- Alma mater: University of Sarajevo
- Occupation: Actor
- Years active: 1992–present

Branimir Popović (Montenegrin: Бранимир Поповић; born 17 January 1967) is a Montenegrin actor and politician.

== Career ==
He graduated from Academy of Performing Arts in Sarajevo in 1992. He appeared in more than twenty films since 1992. From 2000 to 2003, he served as Minister of Culture in the Government of Montenegro.

== Selected filmography ==
Year	Title	Role	Notes
2023	Supermarket	Robert	
2023–2024	Igra sudbine	Andrija Bošnjak	TV Series
2022–2023	Od jutra do sutra	Vojislav Filipović "Voja Ajkula"	TV Series
2022	May Labour Day	Hamdija	
2020	Focus, Grandma	Bane	
2014	The Kids from the Marx and Engels Street	Petar Popara Sr.	
2012–2013	Larin izbor	Šimun Santini	TV Series
2011	The Parade	Zvonce	
2008	The Tour	Bosnian Commander	
2005	I Have Something Important to Tell You	Father	
1998	The Hornet	Abaz	
