= Nada Šargin =

Serbian actress

- Нада Шаргин
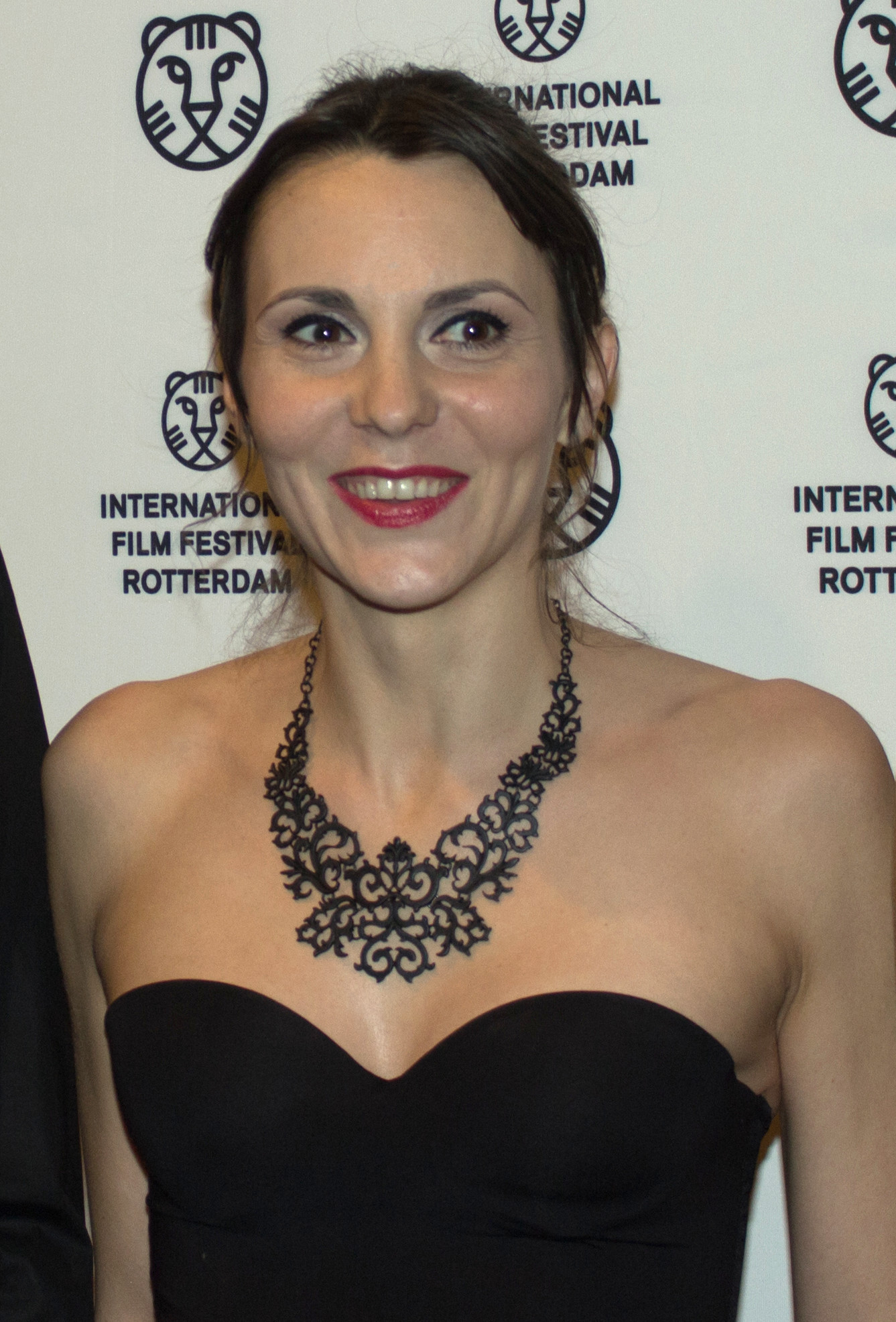
- Nada Šargin at the premier of The Sky Above Us during the International Film Festival Rotterdam 2015
- Born: 19 January 1977 (age 49); Zrenjanin, SR Serbia, SFR Yugoslavia
- Education: Academy of Arts
- Alma mater: University of Novi Sad
- Occupation: Actor
- Years active: 2003–present

Nada Šargin (Serbian Cyrillic: Нада Шаргин: born 19 January 1977) is a Serbian actress. She appeared in more than twenty films since 2003.

== Selected filmography ==
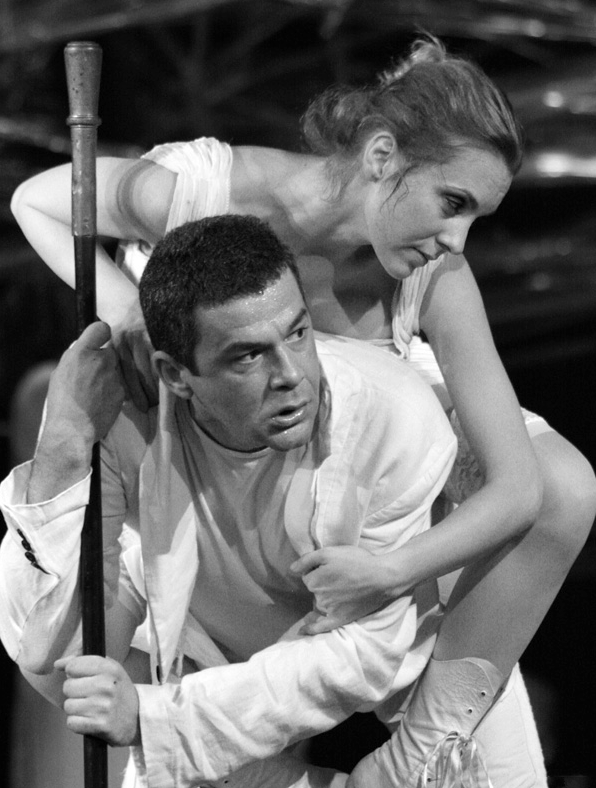
Nebojša Glogovac and Nada Šargin at a theater festival in 2010

Film
Year	Title	Role	Notes
2006	Tomorrow Morning	Sale	
2008	The Tour		
2008	Will Not End Here	Desa	
2008	Tears for Sale		
2010	The Woman with a Broken Nose	Jasmina	
2012	When Day Breaks	Marija	
2026	Home (Danish: Hjem)	Vera	

TV
Year	Title	Role	Notes
2007–2008	Vratiće se rode	Marina Jović	
