= Supermarket (2023 film) =

- Theatrical release poster
- Directed by: Nemanja Bečanović
- Written by: Nemanja Bečanović
- Produced by: Nemanja Bečanović
- Starring: Bojan Žirović
- Cinematography: Dusan Grubin
- Edited by: Nemanja Bečanović
- Music by: Meta Sound
- Production companies: RTCG - Radio Televizija Crne Gore; VHS Production
- Distributed by: VHS Production
- Release dates: November 16, 2023 (PÖFF); April 18, 2024 (Montenegro)
- Running time: 75 minutes
- Country: Montenegro
- Language: Serbo-Croatian

Supermarket is a 2023 Montenegrin comedy-drama film written, produced, edited and directed by Nemanja Bečanović. It follows a homeless man who lives hidden in a supermarket enjoying the luxuries that the place has with a new visitor. Starring Bojan Žirović accompanied by Branimir Popović and Ana Pejović. The film has been described as a modern reinterpretation of Robinson Crusoe.

It was selected as the Montenegrin entry for the Best International Feature Film at the 97th Academy Awards.

== Synopsis ==
When the doors of the supermarket close, a man comes out of hiding to walk through the silent and empty aisles of the place to proceed to enjoy the luxuries that his "kingdom" offers him. Although, he suspects that he is being watched by something or someone.

== Cast ==
- Bojan Žirović
- Branimir Popović as Robert
- Ana Pejović as Mimi

== Release ==
It had its world premiere on November 16, 2023, at the 27th Tallinn Black Nights Film Festival in the Rebels with a Cause Competition section, then was commercially released on April 18, 2024, in Montenegrin theaters.

== See also ==
- List of submissions to the 97th Academy Awards for Best International Feature Film
- List of Montenegrin submissions for the Academy Award for Best International Feature Film
