= Guǵakovo =

Guǵakovo Гуѓаково
- Village
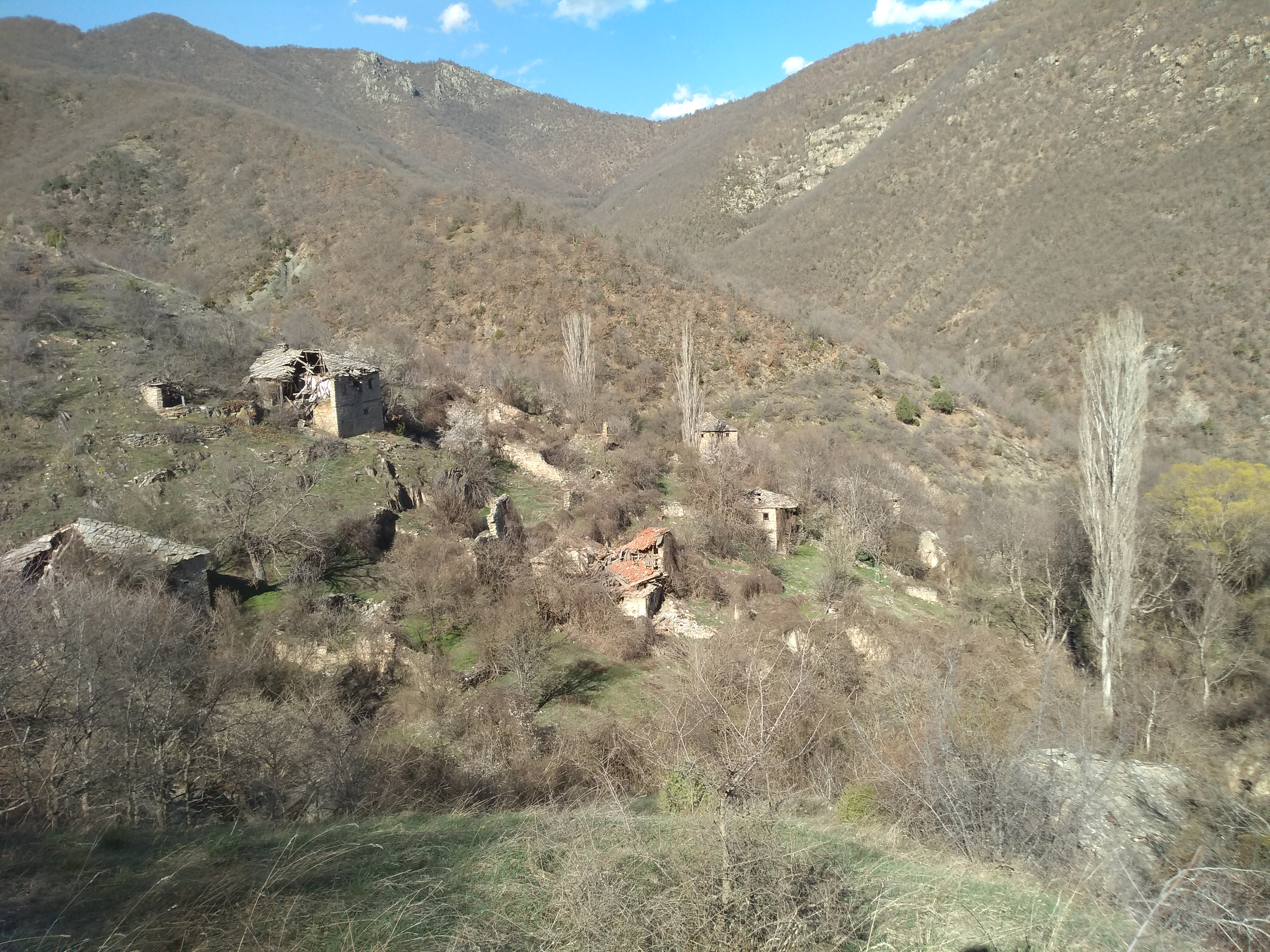
- Interactive map of Guǵakovo
- Country: North Macedonia
- Municipality: Prilep
- Elevation: 592 m (1,942 ft)

Population (2002)
  - Total: 0
- Time zone: UTC+1 (CET)
- Postal code: 7500
- Area code: +38948

Guǵakovo (Macedonian: Гуѓаково) is a village in the Municipality of Prilep.

It was also known as Godjakovo (Serbian Cyrillic: Годјаково) during the Kingdom of Serbia.
