= After the Winter (film) =

2021 film directed by Ivan Bakrač

- Directed by: Ivan Bakrač
- Starring: Momcilo Otasevic
- Release date: 26 August 2021 (KVIFF)
- Running time: 101 minutes
- Countries: Montenegro; Serbia; Croatia
- Language: Serbo-Croatian

After the Winter (Montenegrin: Poslije zime) is a 2021 Montenegrin drama film directed by Ivan Bakrač. It was selected as the Montenegrin entry for the Best International Feature Film at the 94th Academy Awards.

== Plot ==
Five childhood friends remain closely connected despite relocating to different parts of what was formerly Yugoslavia.

== Cast ==
- Momcilo Otasevic as Mladen
- Petar Buric as Danilo
- Maja Susa as Bubi
- Ana Vuckovic as Marija
- Ivona Kustudic as Jana

== See also ==
- List of submissions to the 94th Academy Awards for Best International Feature Film
- List of Montenegrin submissions for the Academy Award for Best International Feature Film
