= Packing the Monkeys, Again! =

- DVD cover for Packing the Monkeys, Again!
- Directed by: Marija Perović
- Written by: Milica Piletić
- Produced by: Novica Samardzić
- Starring: Andrija Milošević; Jelena Dokić
- Cinematography: Dimitrije Joković
- Edited by: Petar Marković
- Music by: Nemanja Mošurović
- Distributed by: RTCG
- Release date: May 15, 2004 (Montenegro)
- Running time: 92 minutes
- Country: Serbia and Montenegro
- Languages: Montenegrin and Serbian

Packing the Monkeys, Again! (Serbian: Opet pakujemo majmune) is a 2004 Montenegrin drama film directed by Marija Perović.

== Plot ==
Packing the Monkeys, Again! is story about love couple, which live in small rented apartment. Nebojša is a journalist who works to much and he asks Jelena to do everything what all traditional Montenegrin women does. Jelana studies literature and she is suspicious for Nebojša having an affair. Of course, owners of their apartment are coming in their lives and bringing their problems to house of Nebojša and Jelena - Nata, Dragica's and Dragoljub's daughter is a problematic child. But, most interesting thing is that, person who is re-telling this story, is a man with amnesia who doesn't know in which bathroom he fell on his head and writing is a part of his therapy.

== Cast ==
- Andrija Milošević
- Branislav Popović
- James Ard
- Ivona Čović
- Jelena Đokić
- Boro Stjepanović
- Dubravka Vukotić
