= The Black Pin =

2016 film

- Film poster
- Directed by: Ivan Marinovic
- Written by: Ivan Marinovic
- Starring: Nikola Ristanovski
- Release dates: 18 August 2016 (Sarajevo); 10 September 2016 (Montenegro)
- Running time: 100 minutes
- Country: Montenegro
- Language: Montenegrin

The Black Pin (Montenegrin: Igla ispod praga) is a 2016 Montenegrin drama film directed by Ivan Marinović. It was selected as the Montenegrin entry for the Best Foreign Language Film at the 89th Academy Awards but it was not nominated.

== Cast ==
- Nikola Ristanovski as Petar
- Bogdan Diklić as Dondo
- Jelisaveta Sablić as Baba
- Filip Klicov as Đorđe
- Leon Lucev as Savo

== See also ==
- List of submissions to the 89th Academy Awards for Best Foreign Language Film
- List of Montenegrin submissions for the Academy Award for Best Foreign Language Film
