= Sušica (Valjevo) =

Sušica Сушица
- Village
- Location within Serbia
- Coordinates: 44°13′N 19°44′E
- Country: Serbia
- District: Kolubara District
- Municipality: Valjevo

Population (2002)
  - Total: 301
- Time zone: UTC+1 (CET)
  - Summer (DST): UTC+2 (CEST)

Sušica is a village in the municipality of Valjevo, Serbia. According to the 2002 census, the village has a population of 301 people.

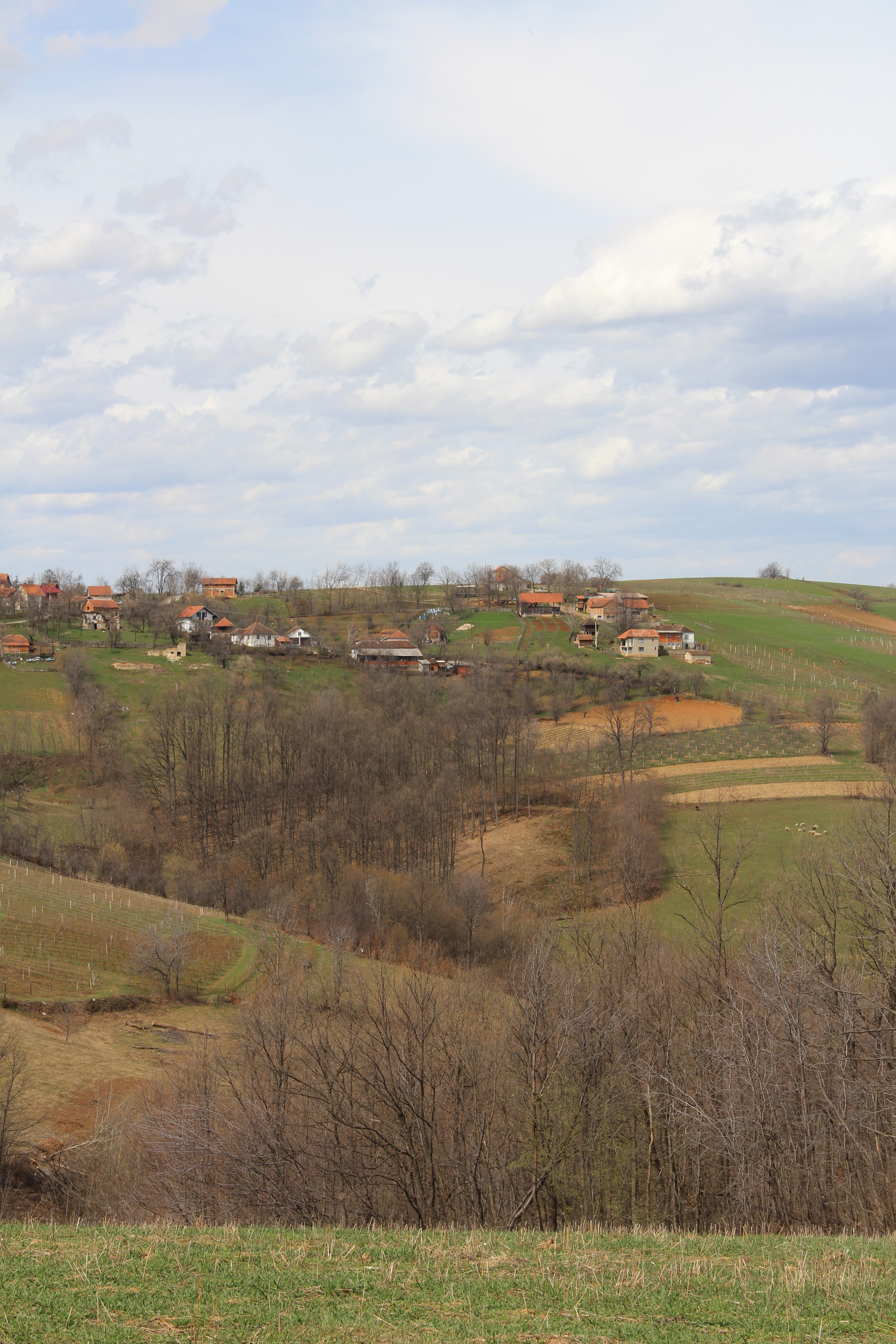
Sušica - Panorama

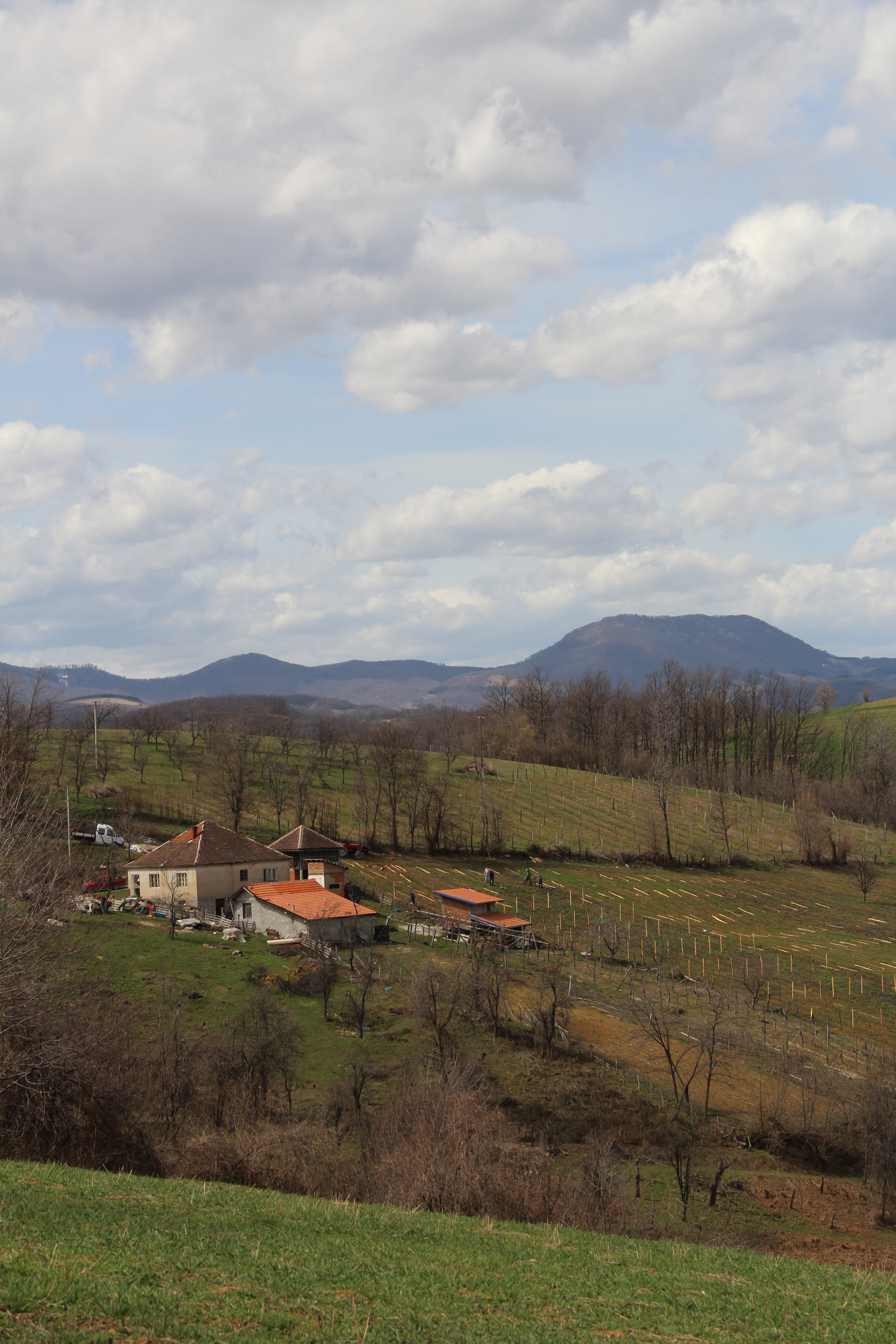
Sušica - Panorama

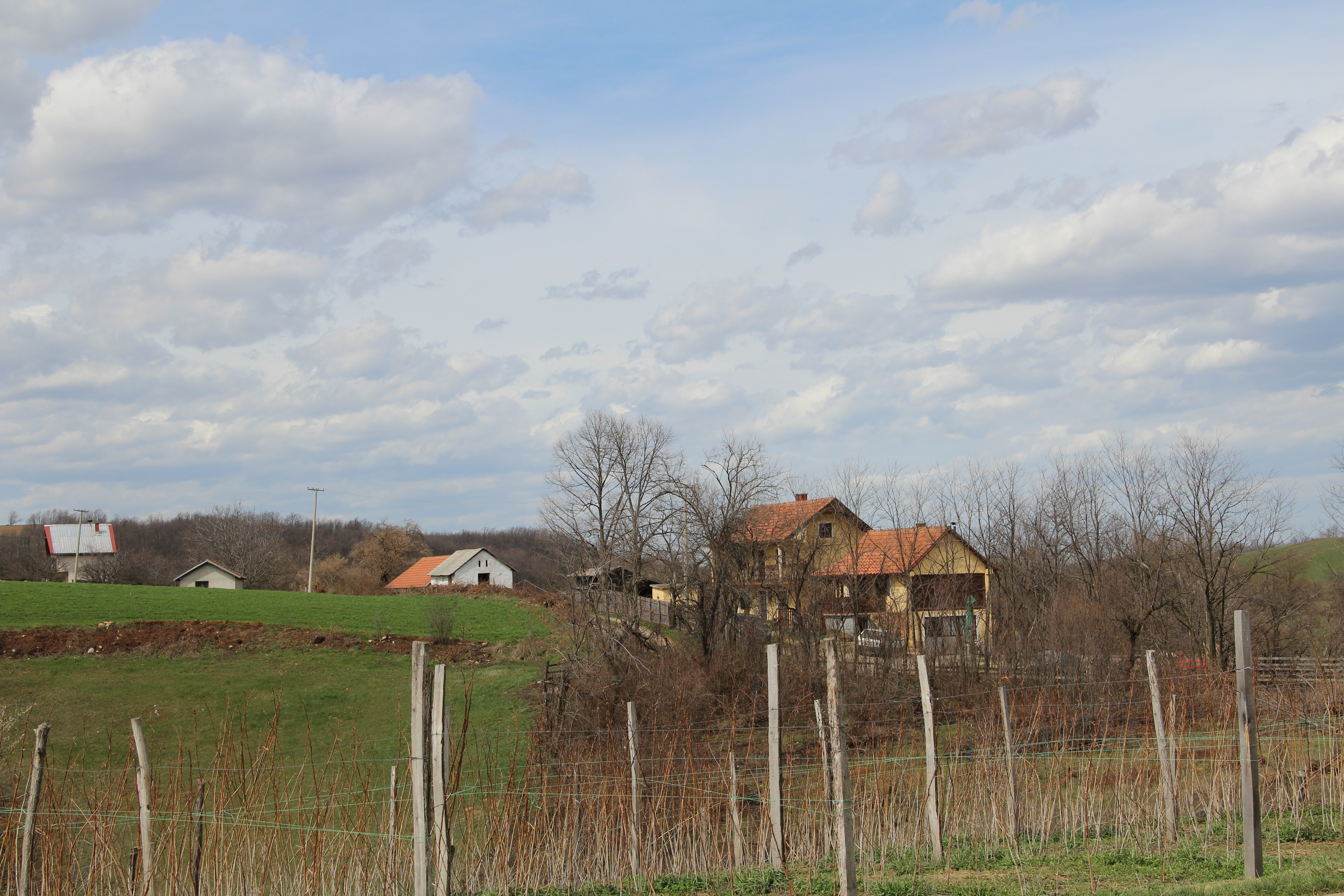
Sušica - Panorama

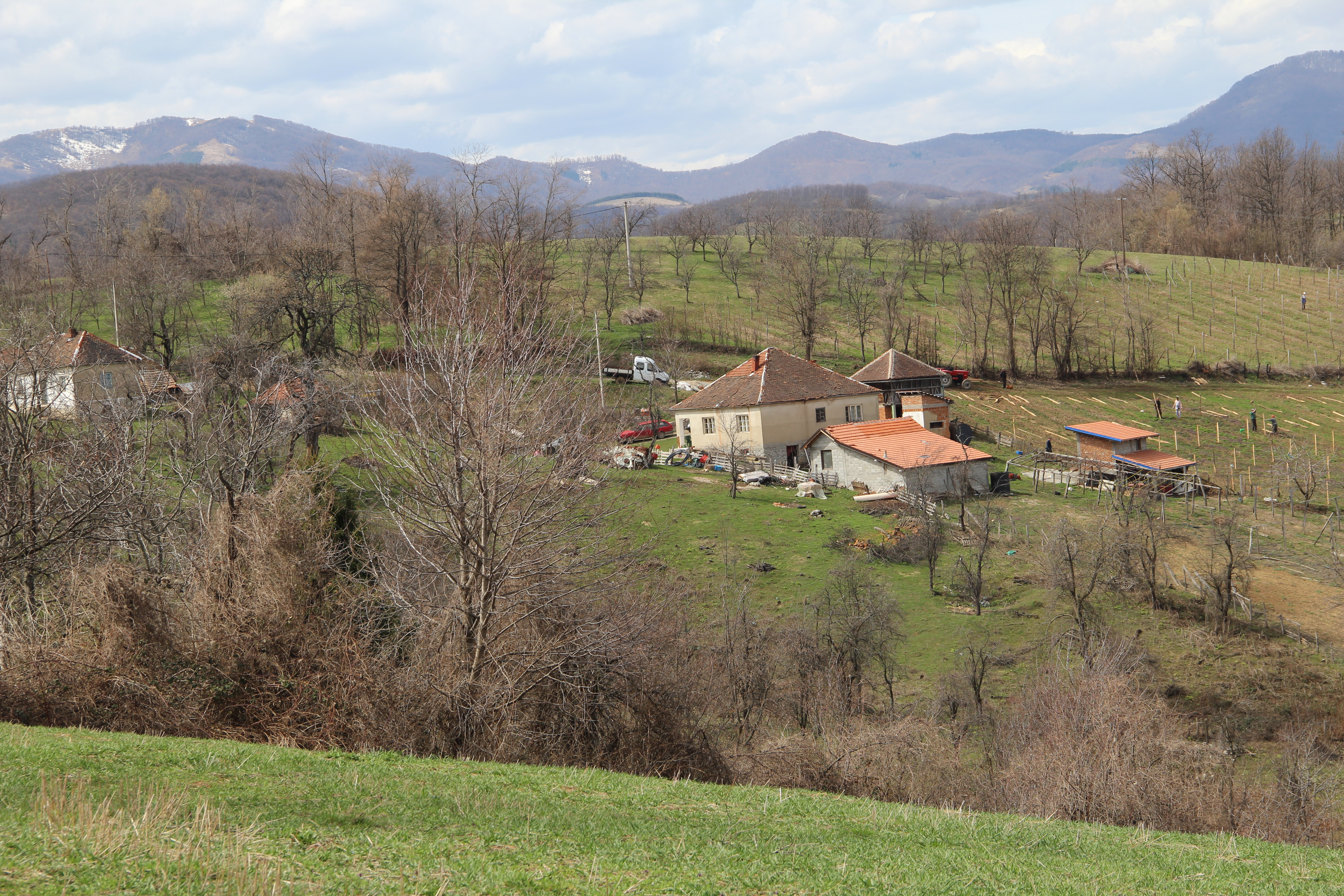
Sušica - Panorama

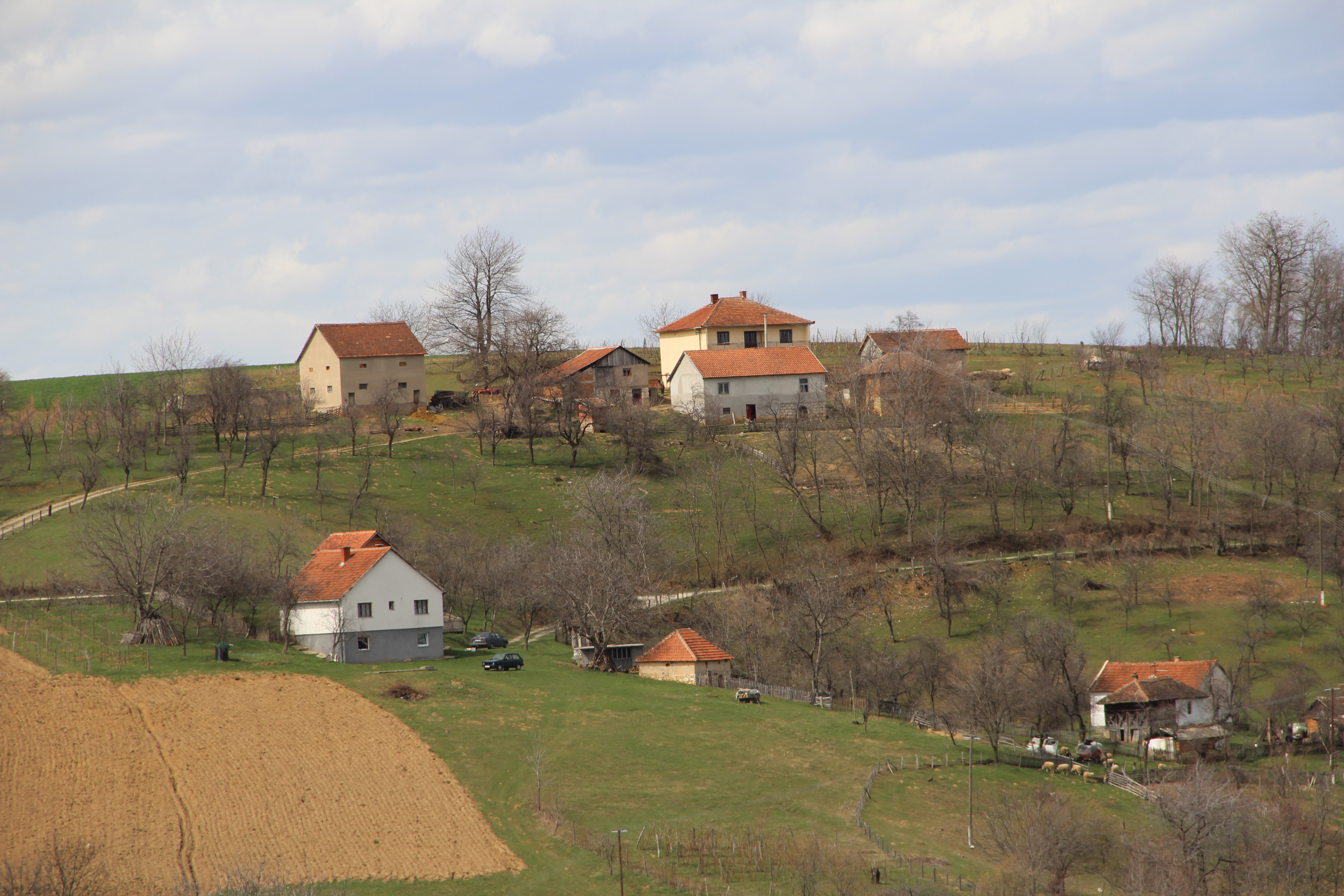
Sušica - Panorama

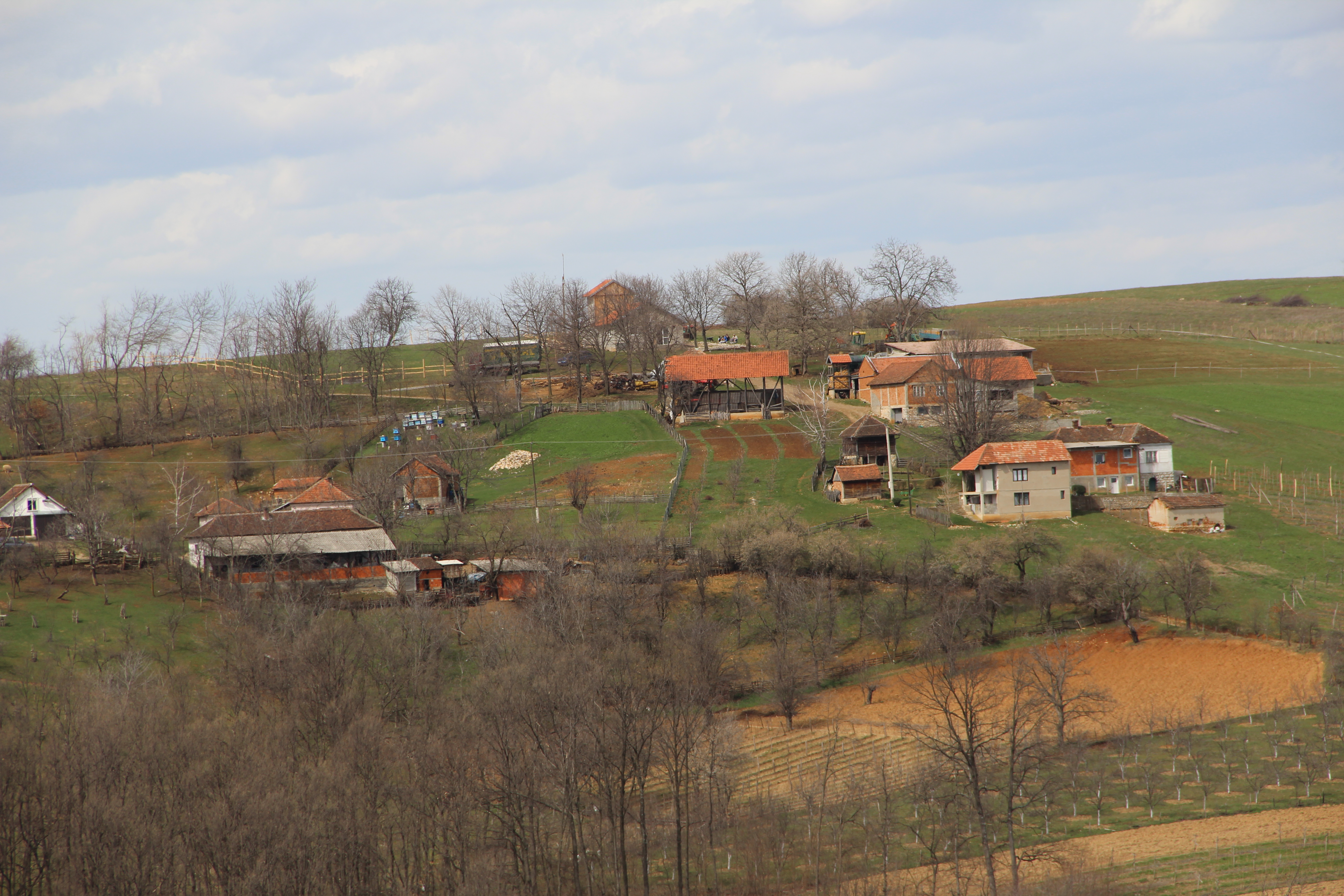
Sušica - Panorama
