= A View from Eiffel Tower =

A view from the Eiffel tower
- DVD cover
- Directed by: Nikola Vukčević
- Written by: Irena Kikić-Stojković; Nikola Vukčević
- Produced by: Ivan Đurović; Milko Josifov
- Starring: Branislav Trifunović; Marija Vicković; Darko Rundek
- Cinematography: Nikola Sekerić
- Edited by: Olga Toni
- Music by: Vladimir Moritz
- Distributed by: Cinears
- Release date: 2005 (Montenegro)
- Running time: 92 minutes
- Countries: Serbia and Montenegro
- Language: Montenegrin-Serbian

A View from the Eiffel tower (Montenegrin: Pogled sa Ajfelovog tornja) is a 2005 Montenegrin drama film directed by Nikola Vukčević and starring Branislav Trifunović, Marija Vicković, and Darko Rundek.

== Plot ==
The main character Marijana is a beautiful 25-year-old girl. When she was 16 her father's boss sexually abused her. Marijana's father progressed his career (as a gynaecologist willing to perform illegal abortions) due to his boss's assistance and did nothing about the abuse.

Ten years later, Marijana seeks to avenge what was done to her by becoming a prostitute, sleeping with her father's colleagues and harming his reputation. She falls in love with a poor sculptor named Vanja, but struggles to reconcile her love with prostitution.

== Cast ==
- Branislav Trifunović
- Lena Bogdanović
- Petar Božović
- Svetozar Cvetković
- Varja Ðukić
- Igor Lazić
- Irfan Mensur
- Andrija Milošević
- Dragana Mrkić
- Darko Rundek
- Sergej Trifunović
- Marija Vicković
- Dubravka Vukotić
