= Tomorrow Morning (film) =

2006 film

- Directed by: Oleg Novković
- Starring: Uliks Fehmiu; Nada Šargin
- Release date: 30 August 2006
- Running time: 1h 24min
- Country: Serbia
- Language: Serbian

Tomorrow Morning (Serbian: Sutra ujutru) is a 2006 Serbian drama film directed by Oleg Novković. It was Serbia's submission to the 79th Academy Awards for the Academy Award for Best Foreign Language Film, but was not accepted as a nominee.

== Cast ==
- Uliks Fehmiu - Nele
- Nada Šargin - Sale
- Nebojša Glogovac - Mare
- Lazar Ristovski - Zdravko
- Ljubomir Bandović - Bure
- Radmila Tomović - Ceca
- Danica Ristovski - Zora
- Ana Marković - Maja
- Miloš Vlalukin - Sima
- Jelena Đokić - Radnica u pekari
- Branko Cvejić - Cika Sava
- Renata Ulmanski - Komsinica
- Nebojša Ilić - Taksista

== See also ==
- List of submissions to the 79th Academy Awards for Best Foreign Language Film
- List of Serbian submissions for the Academy Award for Best Foreign Language Film
