= Željko Sošić =

Montenegrin film and theater director (born 1980)

Željko Sošić (born 14 October 1980) is a Montenegrin film and theater director. He is currently director of the Montenegrin National Theater (CNP).

== Biography ==
Sošić was born in Titograd (today's Podgorica), the capital of Montenegro, in October 1980. He attended elementary school in Bijelo Polje, the High School of Philology in Podgorica and the Faculty of Dramatic Arts in Cetinje.

Sošić directed two films - "Imam nešto važno da vam kažem" ("I have something important to tell you") in 2005 and "Mali ljubavni bog" ("The Little Love God") in 2011. He produced and directed the historical TV series "Božićni ustanak" ("The Christmas Uprising"). In October 2018, Sošić was appointed Director of the Montenegrin National Theater in Podgorica.
