= Nikola Vukčević (film director) =

Montenegrin film director

Nikola Vukčević (Montenegrin Cyrillic: Никола Вукчевић; born in Podgorica, SR Montenegro, SFR Yugoslavia) is a Montenegrin film director. He is a stage and film director, an independent producer since 1995 and a member of the film board of the Montenegrin Academy of Sciences and Arts (CANU). He is a professor at the national Faculty of Dramatic Arts – Cetinje and has been the artistic director at City theatre Podgorica since 2004.

Vukcevic received a Bachelors degree for arts in film and theatre from the Academy of Arts Novi Sad, Yugoslavia, studying under the supervision of Vlatko Gilic. In June 2001, he received a master's degree of Arts in drama. His thesis was published as Influence of Film On Theatre of New Forms. Since 2004 Vukcevic is artistic director of City Theatre Podgorica In November 2010, Vukcevic received a PhD in cinema and theatre poetics.

Vukcevic directed 2005 Montenegrin drama film A View from Eiffel Tower. In 2025, his film The Tower of Strength (Obraz) was selected as the Montenegrin entry for the Best International Feature Film at the 98th Academy Awards.
