= 34th European Film Awards =

2021 film awards ceremony in Germany

- Date: 11 December 2021
- Site: Berlin, Germany
- Hosted by: Annabelle Mandeng
- Organized by: European Film Academy
- Official website: EFA

Highlights
- Most awards: Flee (3)
- Most nominations: Quo Vadis, Aida? and Titane (5)

The 34th European Film Awards were presented in Berlin, Germany on 11 December 2021. Due to the ongoing COVID-19 pandemic, the awards went ahead without an in person audience, taking the form of a hybrid event, including pre-produced and live online.

== Selection ==
=== Feature Film ===
The first part of the selection of feature films announced on August 24, 2021.

- 200 Meters – Ameen Nayfeh ( (Palestine) , (Italy) , (Sweden) )
- A Chiara – Jonas Carpignano ( (Italy) , (France) )
- Ahed's Knee (Ha'berech) – Nadav Lapid ( (France) , (Germany) , (Israel) )
- Ammonite – Francis Lee ( (United Kingdom) )
- And Tomorrow the Entire World (Und morgen die ganze Welt) – Julia von Heinz ( (Germany) )
- Annette – Leos Carax ( (France) , (Belgium) , (Germany) , (Mexico) , (Japan) )
- Apples (Μήλα / Mila) – Christos Nikou ( (Greece) , (Poland) , (Slovenia) )
- Assandira – Salvatore Mereu ( (Italy) )
- Bad Luck Banging or Loony Porn (Babardeală cu bucluc sau porno balamuc) – Radu Jude ( (Romania) , (Luxembourg) , (Czech Republic) , (Croatia) )
- Beginning – Dea Kulumbegashvili ( (France) , (Georgia (country)) )
- Brother's Keeper (Okul Tıraşı) – Ferit Karahan ( (Turkey) , (Romania) )
- Compartment No. 6 (Hytti nro 6) – Juho Kuosmanen ( (Finland) , (Russia) , (Estonia) , (Germany) )
- Conference (Конференция / Konferentsiya) – Ivan Tverdovskiy ( (Russia) , (Estonia) , (United Kingdom) , (Italy) )
- Dear Comrades! (Dorogie tovarishchi!) – Andrei Konchalovsky ( (Russia) )
- Fabian – Going to the Dogs (Fabian oder Der Gang vor die Hunde) – Dominik Graf ( (Germany) )
- Forest – I See You Everywhere (Rengeteg – mindenhol látlak) – Bence Fliegauf ( (Hungary) )
- Gaza mon amour – Tarzan and Arab Nasser ( (France) , (Germany) , (Portugal) , (Mandatory Palestine) )
- Good Mother (Bonne mère) – Hafsia Herzi ( (France) )
- Great Freedom (Große Freiheit) – Sebastian Meise ( (Austria) , (Germany) )
- Happening (L'événement) – Audrey Diwan ( (France) )
- Hammamet – Gianni Amelio ( (Italy) )
- Here We Are (Hine Anachnu) – Nir Bergman ( (Israel) , (Italy) )
- Hive (Zgjoi) – Blerta Basholli ( (Kosovo) , (Switzerland) , (North Macedonia) , (Albania) )
- I'm Your Man (Ich bin dein Mensch) – Maria Schrader ( (Germany) )
- Luzzu – Alex Camilleri ( (Malta) )
- Natural Light (Természetes fény) – Dénes Nagy ( (Hungary) , (Germany) , (Latvia) , (France) )
- Never Gonna Snow Again (Śniegu już nigdy nie będzie) – Małgorzata Szumowska, Michał Englert ( (Poland) , (Germany) )
- Night of the Kings (La Nuit des Rois) – Philippe Lacôte ( (France) , (Ivory Coast) , (Canada) , (Senegal) )
- Nowhere Special – Uberto Pasolini ( (Italy) , (Romania) , (United Kingdom) )
- Oasis (Oaza) – Ivan Ikic ( (Serbia) , (Slovenia) , (Netherlands) , (Bosnia and Herzegovina) )
- Petite Maman – Céline Sciamma ( (France) )
- Petrov's Flu (Petrovy v grippe) – Kirill Serebrennikov ( (Russia) )
- Pleasure – Ninja Thyberg ( (Sweden) , (France) , (Netherlands) )
- Preparations to Be Together for an Unknown Period of Time (Felkészülés meghatározatlan ideig tartó együttlétre) – Lili Horvát ( (Hungary) )
- Promising Young Woman – Emerald Fennell ( (United Kingdom) )
- Quo Vadis, Aida? – Jasmila Žbanić ( (Bosnia and Herzegovina) , (Austria) , (Netherlands) , (France) , (Poland) , (Norway) , (Germany) , (Romania) , (Turkey) )
- Riders of Justice (Retfærdighedens Ryttere) – Anders Thomas Jensen ( (Denmark) , (Sweden) )
- Supernova – Harry Macqueen ( (United Kingdom) )
- The Belly of the Sea (El Ventre del Mar) – Agustí Villaronga ( (Spain) )
- The Dig – Simon Stone ( (United Kingdom) )
- The Fam (Le Mif) – Fred Baillif ( (Switzerland) )
- The Father – Florian Zeller ( (United Kingdom) , (France) )
- The Girl and the Spider (Das Mädchen und die Spinne) – Ramon Zürcher, Silvan Zürcher ( (Switzerland) )
- The Hand of God (È stata la mano di Dio) – Paolo Sorrentino ( (Italy) )
- The Innocents (De uskyldige) – Eskil Vogt ( (Norway) )
- The Macaluso Sisters (Le sorelle Macaluso) – Emma Dante ( (Italy) )
- The Mauritanian – Kevin Macdonald ( (United Kingdom) , (United States) , (South Africa) )
- The Whaler Boy (Kitoboy) – Philipp Yuryev ( (Russia) , (Poland) , (Belgium) )
- The Worst Person in the World (Verdens verste menneske) – Joachim Trier ( (Norway) , (France) , (Denmark) , (Sweden) )
- Titane – Julia Ducournau ( (France) , (Belgium) )
- Tove – Zaida Bergroth ( (Finland) , (Sweden) )
- Unclenching the Fists (Razzhimaya kulaki) – Kira Kovalenko ( (Russia) )
- What Do We See When We Look at the Sky? (რას ვხედავთ როდესაც ცას ვუყურებთ? / Ras vkhedavt, rodesac cas vukurebt?) – Alexandre Koberidze ( (Germany) , (Georgia (country)) )

=== Documentary ===
The selection of 15 documentary films was announced on August 24, 2021.

- A New Shift (Nová šichta) – Jindřich Andrš ( (Czech Republic) )
- A Song Called Hate – Anna Hildur Hildibrandsdóttir ( (Iceland) )
- All-In – Volkan Üce ( (Belgium) , (Netherlands) , (France) )
- Babi Yar. Context – Sergei Loznitsa ( (Netherlands) , (Ukraine) )
- Flee (Flugt) – Jonas Poher Rasmussen ( (Denmark) , (Sweden) , (France) , (Norway) )
- Gorbachev. Heaven (Gorbačovs. Paradīze) – Vitaly Manskiy ( (Latvia) , (Czech Republic) )
- Les Enfants Terribles – Ahmet Necdet Cupur ( (France) , (Turkey) , (Germany) )
- Mr Bachmann and His Class (Herr Bachmann und seine Klasse) – Maria Speth ( (Germany) )
- Taming the Garden – Salomé Jashi ( (Switzerland) , (Germany) , (Georgia (country)) )
- The Banality of Grief – Jon Bang Carlsen ( (Denmark) )
- The First 54 Years: An Abbreviated Manual for Military Occupation – Avi Mograbi ( (France) , (Germany) , (Finland) , (Israel) )
- The Most Beautiful Boy in the World – Kristina Lindström, Kristian Petri ( (Sweden) )
- The Other Side of the River – Antonia Kilian ( (Germany) , (Finland) )
- The Rain Will Never Stop – Alina Gorlova ( (Ukraine) , (Latvia) , (Germany) , (Qatar) )
- We (Nous) – Alice Diop ( (France) )

=== Short film ===
The European Short Film 2021 is presented in co-operation with the following European film festivals (due to the COVID-19 pandemic the list of festivals as well as the dates of the festivals are subject to change – festivals might also be held online). The participating festival choose one candidate each and later nominate five short films for the main prize.

- 10–16 October 2020: International Short Film Festival of Cyprus - The News (dir. Lorin Terezi)
- 15–25 October 2020: Riga International Film Festival ( (Latvia) ) - Push This Button If You Begin to Panic (dir. Gabriel Böhmer)
- 19–25 October 2020: Uppsala Short Film Festival ( (Sweden) ) - Maalbeek (dir. Ismaël Joffroy Chandoutis)
- 24–31 October 2020: Valladolid International Film Festival ( (Spain) ) - The Martyr (dir. Fernando Pomares)
- 3–8 November 2020: Internationale Kurzfilmtage Winterthur ( (Switzerland) ) - Dustin (dir. Naïla Guiguet)
- 4–15 November 2020: Cork International Film Festival ( (Republic of Ireland) ) - Blue Fear (dir. Marie Jacotey & Lola Halifa-Legrand)
- 17–25 November 2020: Black Nights Film Festival – PÖFF Shorts ( (Estonia) ) - Precious (dir. Paul Mas)
- 5–12 December 2020: Leuven International Short Film Festival ( (Belgium) ) - Marlon Brando (dir. Vincent Tilanus)
- 29 January - 6 February 2021: Clermont-Ferrand International Short Film Festival ( (France) ) - Beyond is the Day (dir. Damian Kocur)
- 1–7 February 2021: International Film Festival Rotterdam ( (Netherlands) ) - Flowers Blooming in Our Throats (dir. Eva Giolo)
- 1–5 March 2021: Berlin International Film Festival ( (Germany) ) - Easter Eggs (dir. Nicolas Keppens)
- 10–14 March 2021: Tampere Film Festival ( (Finland) ) - Mission: Hebron (dir. Rona Segal)
- 14–18 April 2021: Go Short – International Short Film Festival Nijmegen ( (Netherlands) ) - The Natural Death of a Mouse (dir. Katharina Huber)
- 27 May - 6 June 2021: VIENNA SHORTS – International Short Film Festival ( (Austria) ) - Bella (dir. Thelyia Petraki)
- 30 May - 6 June 2021: Krakow Film Festival ( (Poland) ) - Hide (dir. Daniel Gray)
- 1–7 June 2021: Kurzfilm Festival Hamburg ( (Germany) ) - Minnen (dir. Kristin Johannessen)
- 6–17 July 2021: Festival de Cannes ( (France) ) - Displaced (dir. Samir Karahoda)
- 16–25 July 2021: Curtas Vila do Conde – International Film Festival ( (Portugal) ) - Vo (dir. Nicolas Gourault)
- 27–31 July 2021: Motovun Film Festival ( (Croatia) ) - Armadila (dir. Gorana Jovanović)
- 4–14 August 2021: Locarno Film Festival ( (Switzerland) ) - In Flow of Words (dir. Eliane Esther Bots)
- 13–20 August 2021: Sarajevo Film Festival ( (Bosnia and Herzegovina) ) - My Uncle Tudor (dir. Olga Lucovnicova)
- 30 August - 5 September 2021: OFF – Odense International ( (Denmark) ) - The Long Goodbye (dir. Aneil Karia)
- 1–11 September 2021: Venice Film Festival ( (Italy) ) - Fall of the Ibis King (dir. Mikai Geronimo & Josh O'Caoimh)
- 18–25 September 2021: Encounters Film Festival ( (United Kingdom) ) - Zonder Meer (dir. Meltse Van Coillie)
- 19 - 25 September 2021: Drama International Short Film Festival ( (Greece) ) - Nha Sunhu (dir. José Magro)

== Feature Films Awards ==
Nominations were announced on November 9, 2021.

=== Best Film ===
English title	Director(s)	Producer(s)	Country	Language
Compartment No. 6	Juho Kuosmanen	Jussi Rantamäki, Riina Sildos, Jamila Wenske, Melanie Blocksdorf, Natalia Drozd-Makan, Sergey Selyanov	(Finland) / (Russia) / (Estonia) / (Germany)	Russian, Finnish
The Father	Florian Zeller	Philippe Carcassonne, Jean-Louis Livi, David Parfitt	(United Kingdom) / (France)	English
The Hand of God	Paolo Sorrentino	Paolo Sorrentino, Lorenzo Mieli	(Italy)	Italian
Quo Vadis, Aida?	Jasmila Žbanić	Damir Ibrahimović, Jasmila Žbanić	(Bosnia and Herzegovina) / (Austria) / (Netherlands) / (France) / (Poland) / (Norway) / (Germany) / (Romania) / (Turkey)	Bosnian, English, Dutch, Serbian
Titane	Julia Ducournau	Jean-Christophe Reymond, Amaury Ovise, Jean-Yves Roubin, Cassandre Warnauts	(France) / (Belgium)	French

=== Best Director ===
Director(s)	English title
(Romania) Radu Jude	Bad Luck Banging or Loony Porn
(France) Florian Zeller	The Father
(Italy) Paolo Sorrentino	The Hand of God
(Bosnia and Herzegovina) Jasmila Žbanić	Quo Vadis, Aida?
(France) Julia Ducournau	Titane

=== Best Screenwriter ===
Director(s)	English title
(Romania) Radu Jude	Bad Luck Banging or Loony Porn
(France) Florian Zeller (United Kingdom) Christopher Hampton	The Father
(Italy) Paolo Sorrentino	The Hand of God
(Bosnia and Herzegovina) Jasmila Žbanić	Quo Vadis, Aida?
(Norway) / (Denmark) Joachim Trier (Norway) Eskil Vogt	The Worst Person in the World

=== Best Actor ===
Actor	English title	Role
(Russia) Yuriy Borisov	Compartment No. 6	Vadim
(United Kingdom) Anthony Hopkins	The Father	Anthony
(France) Vincent Lindon	Titane	Vincent
(France) Tahar Rahim	The Mauritanian	Mohamedou Ould Salahi
(Germany) Franz Rogowski	Great Freedom	Hans Hoffmann

=== Best Actress ===
Actor	English title	Role
(Serbia) Jasna Đuričić	Quo Vadis, Aida?	Aida Selmanagic
(Finland) Seidi Haarla	Compartment No. 6	Laura
(United Kingdom) Carey Mulligan	Promising Young Woman	Cassandra
(Norway) Renate Reinsve	The Worst Person in the World	Julie
(France) Agathe Rousselle	Titane	Alexia / Adrien

=== EFA Excellence Awards ===
The winners were announced on November 16, 2021. The members of the jury were Camilla Hjelm, Matt Kasmir, Jelena Maksimovic, Ursula Patzak, Célia Sayaphoum, Francis "Kiko" Soeder, Başar Ünder and Leendert van Nimwegen.

=== Best Composer ===
Winner(s)	English title
(Norway) Nils Petter Molvær (Germany) Peter Brötzmann	Great Freedom

=== Best Production Designer ===
Winner(s)	English title
(Hungary) Márton Ágh	Natural Light

=== Best Makeup and Hairstyling ===
Winner(s)	English title
(France) Flore Masson (France) Olivier Afonso (France) Antoine Mancini	Titane

=== Best Sound Designer ===
Winner(s)	English title
(Norway) Gisle Tveito (Sweden) Gustaf Berger	The Innocents

=== Best Cinematographer ===
Winner(s)	English title
(France) Crystel Fournier	Great Freedom

=== Best Costume Designer ===
Winner(s)	English title
(United Kingdom) Michael O'Connor	Ammonite

=== Best Editor ===
Winner(s)	English title
(Russia) Mukharam Kabulova	Unclenching the Fists

=== Best Visual Effects ===
Winner(s)	English title
(Denmark) Peter Hjorth (Sweden) Fredrik Nord	Lamb

== Film Awards Not Based on a Feature Film Selection ==
=== European Comedy ===
The award is presented to the director of a feature-length European comedy intended for theatrical release.

English title	Director(s)	Country	Language
The Morning After	Méliane Marcaggi	(France)	French
Ninjababy	Yngvild Sve Flikke	(Norway)	Norwegian
The People Upstairs	Cesc Gay	(Spain)	Spanish

=== European Discovery - Prix FIPRESCI ===
In co-operation with FIPRESCI, the International Federation of Film Critics, the award is presented to a director for his/her first full-length European feature film intended for theatrical release. The nominees were announced on 12 October 2021. The 2021 nominations were determined by a committee consisting of European Film Academy Board Members Anita Juka (Croatia) and Joanna Szymańska (Poland), producer/screenwriter Paula Alvarez Vaccaro (UK, Italy), producer Vladimer Katcharava (Georgia) as well as film critics Marta Bałaga (Finland, Poland), Janet Baris (Turkey), Andrei Plakhov (Russia), Frédéric Ponsard (France) and Britt Sørensen (Norway) as representatives of FIPRESCI, the International Federation of Film Critics.

Director(s)	English title
(Georgia (country)) Dea Kulumbegashvili	Beginning
(Iceland) Valdimar Jóhannsson	Lamb
(Belgium) Laura Wandel	Playground
(Sweden) Ninja Thyberg	Pleasure
(United Kingdom) Emerald Fennell	Promising Young Woman
(Russia) Philipp Yuryev	The Whaler Boy

=== European Documentary ===
The award is presented to the director of a European documentary film intended for theatrical release.

English title	Director(s)	Country	Language
Babi Yar. Context	Sergei Loznitsa	(Netherlands) / (Ukraine)	Ukrainian, Russian, German, Polish
Flee	Jonas Poher Rasmussen	(Denmark) / (France) / (Sweden) / (Norway)	Danish, English, Dari, Russian, Swedish
The Most Beautiful Boy in the World	Kristina Lindström & Kristian Petri	(Sweden)	English, French, Italian, Japanese, Swedish
Mr Bachmann and His Class	Maria Speth	(Germany)	German
Taming the Garden	Salomé Jashi	(Switzerland) / (Germany) / (Georgia (country))	Georgian

=== European Animated Feature Film ===
In co-operation with CARTOON, the European Association of Animation Film, the award is presented to the director of a European animated feature film intended for theatrical release.

English title	Director(s)	Country	Language
The Ape Star	Linda Hambäck	(Sweden) / (Norway) / (Denmark)	Swedish
Even Mice Belong in Heaven	Denisa Grimmová & Jan Bubenícek	(Czech Republic) / (France) / (Poland) / (Slovakia)	Czech
Flee	Jonas Poher Rasmussen	(Denmark) / (France) / (Sweden) / (Norway)	Danish, English, Dari, Russian, Swedish
Where Is Anne Frank	Ari Folman	(Belgium) / (Luxembourg) / (Israel) / (Netherlands) / (France)	English
Wolfwalkers	Tomm Moore & Ross Stewart	(Republic of Ireland) / (Luxembourg) / (France)	English

=== European Short Film ===
The award is presented to the director of a European short film. The final five short films were nominated from the final list by the participating festivals.

English title	Director(s)	Country	Language
Bella	Thelyia Petraki	(Greece)	Greek
Displaced	Samir Karahoda	(Kosovo)	Albanian
Easter Eggs	Nicolas Keppens	(Belgium) / (France) / (Netherlands)	Dutch
In Flow of Words	Eliane Esther Bots	(Netherlands)	-
My Uncle Tudor	Olga Lucovnicova	(Belgium) / (Portugal) / (Hungary) / (Moldova)	Romanian, Russian

== Honorary Awards ==
EFA Lifetime Achievement Award	European Achievement in World Cinema	EFA Award for Innovative Storytelling	Eurimages Co-Production Award	European Sustainability Award - Prix Film4Climate
(Hungary) Márta Mészáros	(Denmark) Susanne Bier	(United Kingdom) Steve McQueen for Small Axe	(Norway) Maria Ekerhovd	not awarded

== Audience Awards ==
=== Lux Audience Award ===
English title	Director(s)	Country	Language
Quo Vadis, Aida?	Jasmila Žbanić	Bosnia and Herzegovina / Austria / Netherlands / France / Poland/ Norway / Germany / Romania / Turkey	Serbo-Croatian, Bosnian, English, Dutch, Serbian
Flee	Jonas Poher Rasmussen	Denmark / France / Sweden / Norway	Danish, English, Dari, Russian, Swedish
Great Freedom	Sebastian Meise	Austria / Germany	German, English

=== European University Film Award (EUFA) ===
Presented in co-operation with Filmfest Hamburg, the award actively involves university students, spreads the “European idea” and transports the spirit of European cinema to an audience group of 20-29-year-olds. It also supports film dissemination, film education and the culture of debating. Based on the Feature Film Selection 2021 and the Documentary Selection 2021 Filmfest Hamburg and EFA nominate five films. They are later viewed in non-commercial closed jury sessions and discussed at the participating universities. The students at each institution select their favourite film. The nominations were announced on 28 September 2021.

English title	Director(s)	Country	Language
Apples	Christos Nikou	(Greece) / (Poland) / (Slovenia)	Greek, English
Flee	Jonas Poher Rasmussen	(Denmark) / (France) / (Sweden) / (Norway)	Danish, English, Dari, Russian, Swedish
Great Freedom	Sebastian Meise	(Austria) / (Germany)	German
Happening	Audrey Diwan	(France)	French
Quo Vadis, Aida?	Jasmila Žbanić	(Bosnia and Herzegovina) / (Austria) / (Netherlands) / (France) / (Poland) / (Norway) / (Germany) / (Romania) / (Turkey)	Serbo-Croatian, Bosnian, English, Dutch, Serbian
