= 71st Berlin International Film Festival =

2021 film festival in Berlin, Germany

- Festival poster
- Location: Berlin, Germany
- Founded: 1951
- Awards: Golden Bear: Bad Luck Banging or Loony Porn
- Festival date: 1–5 March 2021
- Website: http://www.berlinale.de

Berlin International Film Festival chronology
- 72nd 70th

The 71st annual Berlin International Film Festival took place from 1 to 5 March 2021 as a virtual festival due to the COVID-19 pandemic.

Romanian film Bad Luck Banging or Loony Porn directed by Radu Jude won the Golden Bear. It was the third victory of Romania in the last nine years.

== Juries ==
=== Competition ===
The following were on the jury for the Berlinale Competition section:

- Ildikó Enyedi, Hungarian filmmaker
- Nadav Lapid, Israeli filmmaker
- Adina Pintilie, Romanian filmmaker
- Mohammad Rasoulof, Iranian filmmaker
- Gianfranco Rosi, Italian filmmaker
- Jasmila Žbanić, Bosnian filmmaker

=== Encounters ===
The following people were on the jury for the Encounters Awards:

- Florence Almozini, French programmer
- Cecilia Barrionuevo, Argentinian artistic director
- Diedrich Diederichsen, German editor and publisher

=== International Short Film ===
The following people were on the jury for the Berlinale Shorts section:

- Basim Magdy, Egyptian artist
- Christine A. Maier, Austrian cinematographer
- Sebastian Urzendowsky, German actor

== Competition ==
=== Main Competition ===
The following films were selected for the main competition for the Golden Bear and Silver Bear awards:

| English title | Original title | Director(s) | Production country |
|---|---|---|---|
| Bad Luck Banging or Loony Porn | Babardeală cu bucluc sau porno balamuc | Radu Jude | Romania |
| Ballad of a White Cow | قصیده گاو سفید | Behtash Sanaeeha and Maryam Moqadam | Iran, France |
| A Cop Movie | Una película de policías | Alonso Ruizpalacios | Mexico |
| Drift Away | Albatros | Xavier Beauvois | France |
| Fabian – Going to the Dogs | Fabian oder Der Gang vor die Hunde | Dominik Graf | Germany |
| Forest - I See You Everywhere | Rengeteg - mindenhol látlak | Bence Fliegauf | Hungary |
| I'm Your Man | Ich bin dein Mensch | Maria Schrader | Germany |
| Introduction | 인트로덕션 | Hong Sang-soo | South Korea |
| Memory Box | الدفاتر | Joana Hadjithomas and Khalil Joreige | France, Lebanon, Canada, Qatar |
| Mr. Bachmann and His Class | Herr Bachmann und seine Klasse | Maria Speth | Germany |
| Natural Light | Természetes fény | Dénes Nagy | Hungary, Latvia, France, Germany |
| Next Door | Nebenan | Daniel Brühl | Germany |
| Petite Maman | | Céline Sciamma | France |
| What Do We See When We Look at the Sky? | რას ვხედავთ როდესაც ცას ვუყურებთ? | Alexandre Koberidze | Germany, Georgia |
| Wheel of Fortune and Fantasy | 偶然と想像 | Ryusuke Hamaguchi | Japan |

=== Berlinale Special ===
| English title | Original title | Director(s) | Production country |
|---|---|---|---|
| Best Sellers | | Lina Roessler | Canada, United States |
| Courage | | Aliaksei Paluyan | Germany |
| For Lucio | Per Lucio | Pietro Marcello | Italy |
| French Exit | | Azazel Jacobs | Canada, Ireland |
| Je suis Karl | | Christian Schwochow | Germany, Czech Republic |
| Language Lessons | | Natalie Morales | United States |
| Limbo | | Soi Cheang | Hong Kong |
| The Mauritanian | | Kevin Macdonald | United Kingdom |
| Tides | | Tim Fehlbaum | Germany, Switzerland |
| Tina | | Daniel Lindsay, T. J. Martin | United States |
| Who We Were | Wer wir waren | Marc Bauder | Germany |

=== Encounters ===
The following films were selected for the Encounters section:

| English title | Original title | Director(s) | Production country |
|---|---|---|---|
| As I Want | | Samaher Alqadi | Egypt, France, Norway, Palestine |
| Azor | | Andreas Fontana | Switzerland, France, Argentina |
| The Beta Test | | Jim Cummings, PJ McCabe | United States, United Kingdom |
| Bloodsuckers | Blutsauger | Julian Radlmaier | Germany |
| District Terminal | Mantagheye payani | Bardia Yadegari, Ehsan Mirhosseini | Iran, Germany |
| The Girl and the Spider | Das Mädchen und die Spinne | Ramon Zürcher, Silvan Zürcher | Switzerland |
| Moon, 66 Questions | Selini, 66 erotiseis (Σελήνη, 66 ερωτήσεις) | Jacqueline Lentzou | Greece, France |
| Rock Bottom Riser | | Fern Silva | United States |
| The Scary of Sixty-First | | Dasha Nekrasova | United States |
| Social Hygiene | Hygiène sociale | Denis Côté | Canada |
| Taste | Vị | Le Bao | Vietnam, Singapore, France, Thailand, Germany, Taiwan |
| We | Nous | Alice Diop | France |

=== Panorama ===
The following films were selected for the Panorama section:

| English title | Original title | Director(s) | Production country |
|---|---|---|---|
| All Eyes Off Me | Mishehu Yohav Mishehu | Hadas Ben Aroya | Israel |
| A Balance | Yuko No Tenbin | Yujiro Harumoto | Japan |
| Bliss | Glück | Henrika Kull | Germany |
| Brother's Keeper | Okul Tıraşı | Ferit Karahan | Turkey, Romania |
| Celts | Kelti | Milica Tomovic | Serbia |
| Censor | | Prano Bailey-Bond | United Kingdom |
| Copilot | Die Welt wird eine andere sein | Anne Zohra Berrached | Germany, France |
| Death of a Virgin, and the Sin of Not Living | | George Peter Barbari | Lebanon |
| Dirty Feathers | | Carlos Alfonso Corral | United States, Mexico |
| Genderation | | Monika Treut | Germany |
| Human Factors | Der menschliche Faktor | Ronny Trocker | Germany, Italy, Denmark |
| The Last Forest | A Última Floresta | Luiz Bolognesi | Brazil |
| Miguel's War | | Eliane Raheb | Lebanon, Germany, Spain |
| Night Raiders | | Danis Goulet | Canada, New Zealand |
| North By Current | | Angelo Madsen Minax | United States |
| Souad | | Ayten Amin | Egypt, Tunisia, Germany |
| Ted K | | Tony Stone | United States |
| Theo and the Metamorphosis | Théo et les métamorphoses | Damien Odoul | France |
| The World After Us | Le monde après nous | Louda Ben Salah-Cazanas | France |

=== Perspektive Deutsches Kino ===
The following films were selected for the Perspektive Deutsches Kino section:

| English title | Original title | Director(s) |
|---|---|---|
| Instructions for Survival | | Yana Ugrekhelidze |
| Jesus Egon Christ | Jesus Egon Christus | David Vajda, Saša Vajda |
| Keep Moving | In Bewegung bleiben | Salar Ghazi |
| The Seed | Die Saat | Mia Maariel Meyer |
| When a Farm Goes Aflame | | Jide Tom Akinleminu |
| Wood and Water | | Jonas Bak |

== Official Awards ==
=== Main Competition ===
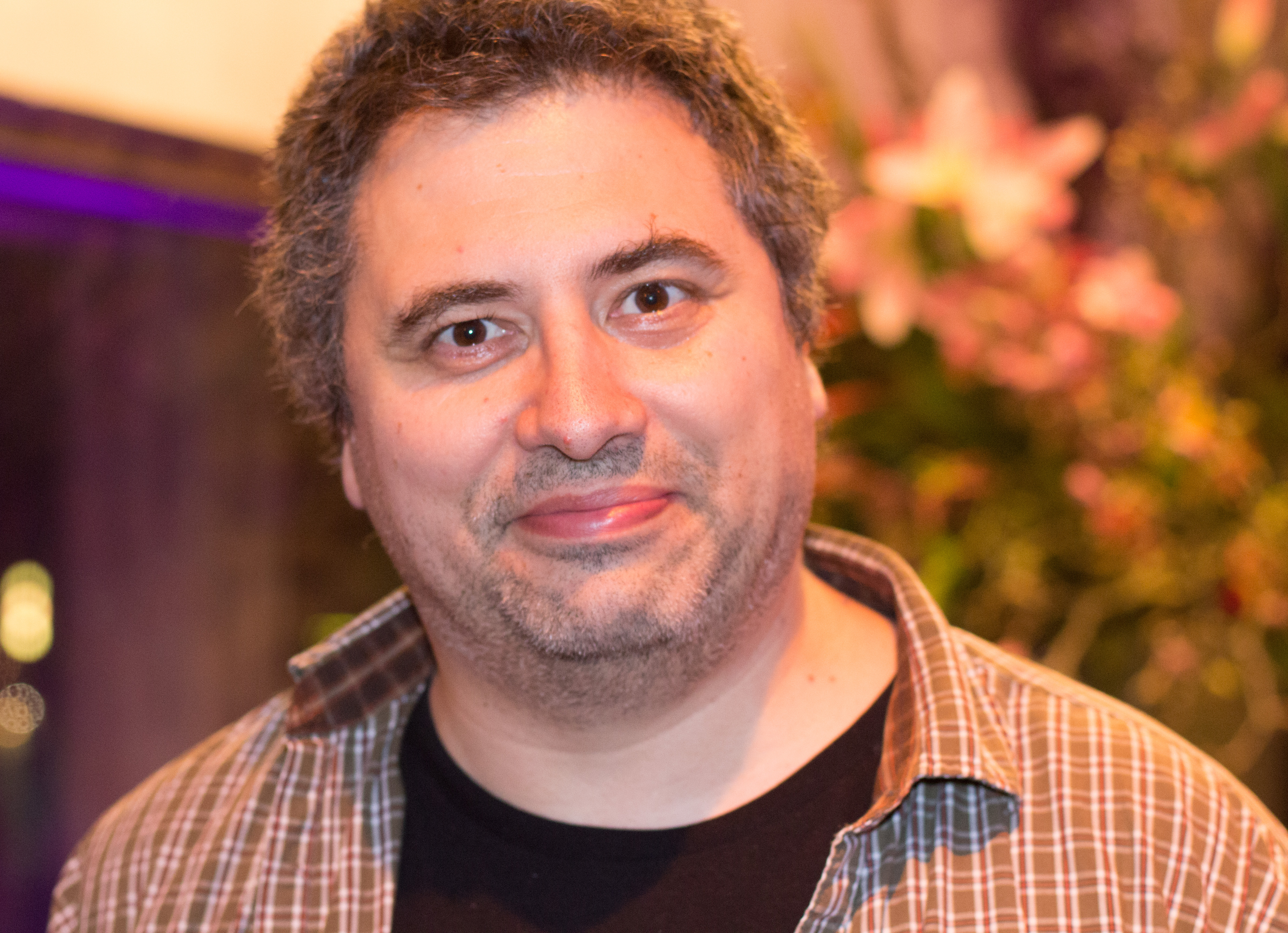
Romanian director Radu Jude won the Berlinale's Golden Bear.

- Golden Bear: Bad Luck Banging or Loony Porn by Radu Jude
- Silver Bear Grand Jury Prize: Wheel of Fortune and Fantasy by Ryusuke Hamaguchi
- Silver Bear Jury Prize: Mr. Bachmann and His Class by Maria Speth
- Silver Bear for Best Director: Dénes Nagy for Natural Light
- Silver Bear for Best Leading Performance: Maren Eggert for I'm Your Man
- Silver Bear for Best Supporting Performance: Lilla Kizlinger for Forest - I See You Everywhere
- Silver Bear for Best Screenplay: Hong Sang-soo for Introduction
- Silver Bear for Outstanding Artistic Contribution: Yibrán Asuad for A Cop Movie (editing)

=== Encounters ===
- Best Film: We by Alice Diop
- Special Jury Award: Taste by Lê Bảo
- Best Director: (ex-aequo)
  - Ramon Zürcher and Silvan Zürcher for The Girl and the Spider
  - Denis Côté for Social Hygiene
  - Special Mention: Rock Bottom Riser by Fern Silva

=== International Short Film ===
- Golden Bear for Best Short Film: My Uncle Tudor by Olga Lucovnicova
- Silver Bear Jury Prize: Day Is Gone by Zhang Dalei
- Berlin Short Film Candidate for the European Film Awards: Easter Eggs by Nicolas Keppens

=== Generation ===
==== Kplus competition ====
- Grand Prix: Summer Blur by Han Shuai
  - Special Mention: A School in Cerro Hueso by Betania Cappato

==== 14plus competition ====
- Grand Prix: The Fam by Fred Baillif
  - Special Mention: Cryptozoo by Dash Shaw
