= Taming the Garden =

2021 documentary film

- Directed by: Salomé Jashi
- Produced by: Vadim Jendreyko, Erik Winker, Martin Roelly, Salomé Jashi
- Release date: 2021
- Countries: Switzerland, Germany, Georgia

Taming the Garden is a 2021 documentary film directed by Salomé Jashi, a former journalist. It was nominated for the World Cinema Documentary Competition at the 2021 Sundance Film Festival.

== Synopsis ==
The film documents the extreme lengths that Bidzina Ivanishvili, Georgia's former prime minister and the world's 349th richest billionaire, goes to acquire trees for the construction of the Shekvetili Dendrological Park, an arboretum on his estate on the coast of the Black Sea.

== Release ==
The film had its world premiere at the Sundance Film Festival.

== Reception ==
=== Critical response ===
Claire Armitstead said, "Taming the Garden is far from a balanced two-minute news report; it stands at the junction of documentary and myth".

== Awards and nominations ==
It was nominated for the World Cinema Documentary Competition at the 2021 Sundance Film Festival. It was nominated for the 34th European Film Awards. It was nominated for the Audience Award, Insights at the 2021 Vancouver International Film Festival. It won in the international DOCU/WORLD Competition at DocuDays UA International Documentary Human Rights Film Festival.

== Salomé Jashi ==
Salomé Jashi was born in 1981, in Tbilisi, Georgia. She graduated from Tbilisi State University and the Caucasian School of Journalism and Media Management at Georgian Institute of Public Affairs. Later working as a reporter for a few years. In 2005, she received a scholarship from British Council, to study documentary filmmaking, at Royal Holloway, University of London.
