= Hasan Nuhanović =

Bosnian massacre survivor (born 1968)

Hasan Nuhanović (born 2 April 1968 in Zvornik) is a Bosnian survivor of the Srebrenica genocide who campaigns "For truth and justice" on behalf of other survivors and relatives of the victims. Hasan, the former U.N. interpreter for Dutch peacekeepers who were stationed in Srebrenica in 1995, at the end of the Bosnian war, has been battling the Dutch state in civil court for nine years. Finally, in July 2011, he won on appeal against the Dutch Government with court stating the Dutchbat are to blame for handing over his family members to forces of Ratko Mladić, who was tried in The Hague. His entire immediate family: mother, father and brother, were murdered by the Bosnian Serb Army and its allies from Serbia proper, when they were handed over to them by Dutch U.N. soldiers after seeking refuge in the UN protection force base at Potočari following the fall of the town of Srebrenica in July 1995. Bosnian investigative journalist Dragan Stanimirović nicknamed him the “Elie Wiesel of Bosnia", in a reference to another activist survivor of genocide. His story, Zbijeg, was published in Bosnian in 2012 and in English as The Last Refuge: A True Story of War, Survival and Life Under Siege in Srebrenica in 2019.

== Srebrenica ==
As a U.N. translator/interpreter, Hasan Nuhanović worked with the Dutchbat III contingent of the United Nations Protection Force (UNPROFOR) which was assigned the task of protecting the United Nations "safe area" of Srebrenica in the latter part of the Bosnian war (1992–1995). When Srebrenica fell to Bosnian Serb Army forces under General Ratko Mladić in July 1995, Nuhanović's family were among 5000-6000 civilian refugees who found shelter on the UN base in Potočari. His father Ibro was one of three representatives of the 30,000 refugees inside and outside the base who took part with Dutch senior officers in supposed "negotiations" with Gen. Mladić.

Following the "negotiations" with Mladić, the Dutch ordered the refugees sheltering inside the base to leave. As an interpreter, Hasan Nuhanović was instructed by Dutch colleagues to tell his own family they had to leave the base. In spite of his pleas on their behalf, his family were not allowed to remain under UN protection and were handed over to their deaths at the hands of the Bosnian Serb Army, as victims of the Srebrenica genocide. Remains of his father Ibro, mother Nasiha and brother Muhamed have been recovered from concealed mass graves. His mother's burned remains were found with those of another six victims under a rubbish heap in the village of Jarovlje, about a mile from the family's pre-war home in Vlasenica. His brother and father had been buried in a primary grave at the Branjevo Farm execution site, near Pilica, before the bodies there were dug up with bulldozers shortly before the Dayton Agreement and taken for reburial in a secondary mass grave, one of the thirteen Čančari grave sites at Kamenica. The remains of all three have now been interred in the cemetery at the Srebrenica Genocide Memorial in Potočari.

== Campaigning activities ==
Since the end of the Bosnian war, Hasan Nuhanović has campaigned to establish and publicise the truth about the genocide. He has given evidence at the International Criminal Tribunal for the Former Yugoslavia at The Hague. He played an important part in establishing the Srebrenica Genocide Memorial at Potočari where the remains of many of the identified victims have been interred. He works closely with other survivors and relatives' organisations, including the Mothers of Srebrenica in Sarajevo and the Women of Srebrenica in Tuzla.

He has written a chronology of the events at Srebrenica, Under the UN Flag, in which he examines the responsibility and guilt of members of the international community who were either direct participants on the ground or indirectly influenced or were capable of influencing those events but failed to fulfil their commitment to protect the Bosnian Muslim population of the besieged "safe area" under UN Security Council Resolution 819. Under the UN Flag served as an inspiration for Jasmila Žbanić's 2020 film Quo Vadis, Aida?.

== Legal proceedings against the Dutch State ==
International humanitarian law defines the conduct and responsibilities of belligerent nations, neutral nations and individuals engaged in warfare, in relation to each other and to protected persons (usually meaning civilians). However the relevant treaties do not expressly envisage causes of action for victims in national or international law. Liesbeth Zegveld, a Dutch specialist in international humanitarian law, has drawn attention to their failure expressly to guarantee victims of violations of the law any right to a legal remedy.

In order to seek redress for the death of their relatives, Hasan Nuhanović and the family of Rizo Mustafić, a UN electrician ordered by his employers to leave the Potočari base, have taken legal action in the Dutch civil courts, where they are represented by Liesbeth Zegveld. The bases of the action include allegations, inter alia, that the Dutch State was involved in genocide and violated fundamental human rights by handing Nuhanović's and the Mustafićs' family members over to the (Bosnian-Serb) enemy.

In its initial hearing of the case the District Court in The Hague found against the claims brought by Hasan Nuhanović and the Mustafić family. The Court ruled that The Netherlands could not be held responsible for the actions of its peacekeepers at Srebrenica because operational "command and control" of the Dutch battalion had been transferred to the United Nations. The plaintiffs are appealing the District Court's judgment.

In a similar civil law action before the District Court, members of the Mothers of Srebrenica association are seeking to hold the United Nations itself responsible for failing to protect their relatives who were among the refugees gathered outside the base and under the protection of UNPROFOR. On 10 July 2008, the Court ruled that the United Nations cannot be sued for failure to protect the victims of genocide at Srebrenica because it enjoys an absolute immunity from liability. This ruling impedes any alternative claim by Hasan Nuhanović and the Mustafić family against the United Nations until the Mothers of Srebrenica's appeal is heard. The outcome of the appeal against the District Court decision will be announced on 5 July 2011.

In "Netherlands v Nuhanovic", judgement of 6 September 2013, the Supreme Court of the Netherlands recognized (see paras 3.9.4 and 3.11.2-3.11.3) the 'dual attribution' provided for in the 4th paragraph of the introductory commentary to ARIO (Articles on Responsibility of International Organizations, see United Nations General Assembly's resolution A/RES/66/100 of 27 February 2012).

As of 2018, according to customary international law enshrined in the Articles on Responsibility of States for Internationally Wrongful Acts (ARSIWA, UN GA Res. 59/83, 12 December 2001) and in the Articles on Responsibility of International Organizations (ARIO, UN GA RES 66/100 27 February 2012), dual attribution of international legal responsibility (i.e. attribution of legal responsibility both to the State and the International Organization involved in the wrongful act) is possible. In conclusion, in all kinds of UN peacekeeping operations, all conduct of the troops is attributable to UN regardless of effective control exercised by UN, since UN peacekeeping operation is an organ of the UN and with reference to ARIO art.6; the very same conduct is also additionally attributable ('dual attribution') to relevant troop-contributing state regardless of effective control exercised by the state, since state's armed forces are an organ of a state (ARSIWA, Art.4.). This is precisely the case for UNPROFOR, which is a UN peacekeeping operation, where according to international law international wrongful acts are hence attributable both to the troop-contributing state and the UN (as recognized by the Supreme court of the Netherlands in the judgement of 6 September 2013). Note that international law is slightly different when it comes to UN-authorized operations which are not organs of the UN (like KFOR).
