= Miguel's War =

2021 documentary film

- Film poster
- Directed by: Eliane Raheb
- Written by: Eliane Raheb
- Produced by: Eliane Raheb
- Starring: Miguel Jleilaty
- Cinematography: Bassem Fayad
- Edited by: Eliane Raheb
- Music by: Mazen Kerbaje
- Production company: Itar Productions
- Release date: 16 June 2021 (Berlin)
- Running time: 128 minutes
- Countries: Germany; Lebanon; Spain
- Languages: Arabic; Spanish

Miguel's War is a 2021 internationally co-produced documentary film, directed by Eliane Raheb and released in 2021. The film is a portrait of Michel Jleilaty, a gay man from Lebanon who has been living in Spain as an adult under the assumed name Miguel Alonso, as he revisits the childhood traumas that made him want to escape his homeland.

The film premiered in the Panorama program at the 71st Berlin International Film Festival, where it won the Teddy Award for best LGBTQ-themed feature film, and took second place for the Panorama Audience Award.
