= Milky Way (2007 film) =

2007 film by Benedek Fliegauf

- Tejút
- Directed by: Benedek Fliegauf
- Written by: Benedek Fliegauf
- Cinematography: Ádám Fillenz; Gergely Pohárnok
- Edited by: Katalin Mészáros
- Music by: Raptor's Kollektíva
- Production companies: Inforg–M&M Film; Duna Workshop (Duna Mühely); Intuit Pictures GmbH
- Release date: 7 August 2007 (Locarno Film Festival)
- Running time: 82 minutes
- Country: Hungary
- Language: None (no dialogue)

Milky Way (Hungarian: Tejút) is a 2007 Hungarian experimental drama film written and directed by Benedek Fliegauf.

== Plot ==
The film presents a sequence of self‑contained scenes observed in extended static takes. Each vignette depicts individuals in isolated or everyday settings—such as a roadside at night, a public bath, or rural landscapes—without spoken dialogue. Meaning is conveyed through gesture, environment, and sound rather than explicit storytelling.

== Style and themes ==
Critics have described Milky Way as a “human nature film”, replacing animals with people in a timeless landscape. The film emphasizes the biosphere, environment, and human presence over plot or political commentary, aiming for a contemplative, meditative effect.

== Release and reception ==
Milky Way screened at several international film festivals, where it was noted for its experimental form, long‑take cinematography, and immersive sound design. In a broader discussion of contemporary Hungarian cinema, ScreenDaily highlighted Fliegauf’s work for its distinctive atmospheric approach and observational style.
