= Forest (2003 film) =

2003 film

- Directed by: Benedek Fliegauf
- Written by: Benedek Fliegauf
- Starring: Rita Braun
- Release date: 31 January 2003
- Running time: 98 minutes
- Country: Hungary
- Language: Hungarian

Forest (Hungarian: Rengeteg) is a 2003 Hungarian drama film written and directed by Benedek Fliegauf. It was selected as the Hungarian entry for the Best Foreign Language Film at the 76th Academy Awards, but it was not nominated.

== Cast ==
- Rita Braun
- Barbara Csonka
- Laszlo Cziffer
- Gábor Dióssy
- Bálint Kenyeres

== See also ==
- List of submissions to the 76th Academy Awards for Best Foreign Language Film
- List of Hungarian submissions for the Academy Award for Best International Feature Film
