= Lihaqqi =

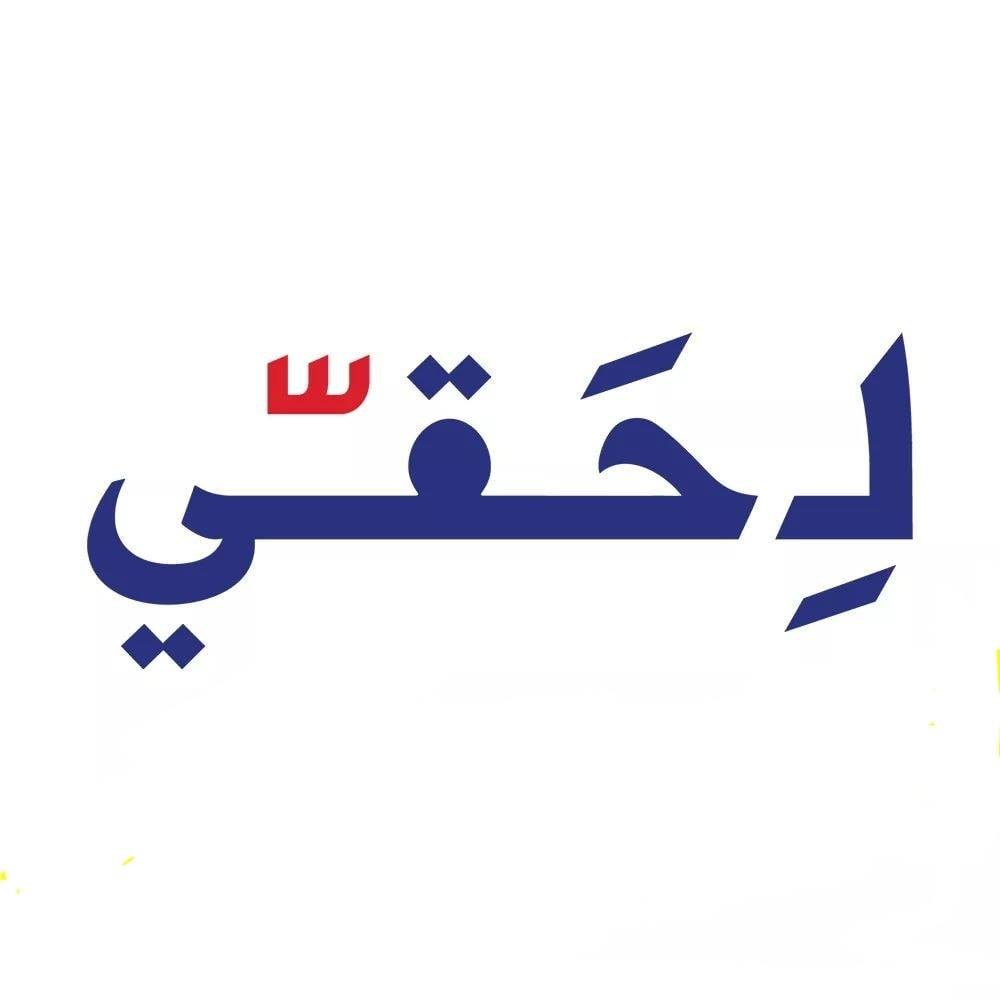
Logo of Lihaqqi (pronounced: lee-ha-qee)

Lihaqqi (Arabic: لِحَقّي) is a grassroots progressive political organization in Lebanon. Founded as a youth-led campaign for the 2018 parliamentary elections, it soon became a prominent anti-establishment movement that was among the groups that helped launch the 2019 protest movement. Lihaqqi's name means "for my rights" in Arabic, its primary slogan is "power to the people", and its internal structure is built around the principles of decentralization, horizontalism, and participatory democracy. The group does not subscribe to any particular ideological dogma, but its political discourse largely falls under the category of left-wing populism.

== History ==
=== Electoral campaign (2017–2018) ===
Lihaqqi was founded in the electoral district of Chouf-Aley ahead of the 2018 parliamentary elections, forming a list with allies under the umbrella of Kulluna Watani. Although none of its candidates were elected to parliament, the list gathered just under 10,000 votes (9,987), which was one of the highest numbers of votes for an opposition list that year.

Rather than being formed around candidates who would then recruit volunteers, Lihaqqi electoral campaign was formed from the bottom-up, by expanding on the grassroots level through activist recruitment, followed by the selection of candidates through an internal democratic process. This process ensured that popularity and influence among members, rather than social status or resources, determined who should run. The bottom-up methodology was rejected by other opposition candidates in the district, which resulted in the rise of another list in the district that competed for opposition votes.

=== Political organization (2018–present) ===
After the end of the 2018 parliamentary elections, Lihaqqi held a general assembly conference to evaluate the results of the elections and determine the fate of the group, and the decision was to transform into a permanent political organization. Since then, Lihaqqi has led and taken part in most protest movements, especially those which target the political and economic establishment in Lebanon.

==== Opposing austerity (2018–2019) ====
Between 2018 and 2019, Lebanon's government introduced a series of measures to reduce fiscal spending and increase revenues, as the government sought foreign funding to help face crippling levels of public debt. The funding, which was pledged in the CEDRE conference in April 2018 mainly by the world bank and foreign states, was conditioned on Lebanon performing fiscal consolidation to reduce deficit levels. In response to austerity policies by the government, and to exert pressure for an economic rescue plan, Lihaqqi and other leftist or left-leaning groups organized demonstrations in Beirut, outlining a series of progressive measures that the country could adopt as a way out of the crisis. However, the reforms done by Lebanese authorities remained limited and symbolic, creating wider popular rage against the political establishment.

==== October 17 uprising ====
By summer 2019, the economic and financial crises seemed increasingly imminent, especially as the national currency had lost value for the first time since 1997 when it was pegged to the dollar. On 13 October, a series of wildfires broke out in Lebanon, concentrated in the area of Chouf, south-east of Beirut. Lihaqqi members and other grassroots activists organized a civilian response to send support to firefighters and relief for displaced families. The failure of the Lebanese government in dealing with the wildfires increased public outrage, especially after it was revealed that the government had failed to maintain the fire-fighting helicopters it had received as gifts in 2009. In response, Lihaqqi called for a protest action scheduled for the following Monday to protest the government's failure and support the demands by firefighters to be provided full labour rights by the state. The protest action was eventually replaced by participation in the uprising.

On October 17, a report by Al-Akhbar newspaper revealed that the government had passed, in its cabinet meeting the day before, a series of regressive taxes to increase revenues. Among those were tax hikes on tobacco and gasoline, an increase in V.A.T., and a tax on WhatsApp calls, which had never been heard of anywhere in the world. In response, the Direct Action Working Group of LiHaqqi called for a protest on the same day, followed by several similar calls by influencers and activists. After protesters moved from Riad al-Solh Square in Downtown Beirut to the central Fouad Chehab Bridge and blocked traffic, their numbers increased with increasing media coverage. Within a few hours, the originally small crowd had turned into thousands marching across Beirut, and a spontaneous uprising took place in most areas of the country.

During the early days of the uprising, Lihaqqi's contribution revolved around mobilizing action on the grassroots level and advancing a revolutionary discourse. In coordination with numerous other groups and parties, it called for the immediate resignation of the Hariri government, and the formation of a politically independent government to enact an economic rescue plan, revive the judiciary's accountability role, and organize early parliamentary elections based on a new electoral law. Following the Hariri government's resignation on October 29, Lihaqqi launched a participatory process to draft a full policy program that translated popular demands and expert knowledge into policies to transition Lebanon into a new political and economic system. The program was drafted by Lihaqqi members based on debates within the organization and public discussions in "revolution tents" in Tripoli, Metn, Beirut, Chouf, Aley, Saida, Tyre, and Baalbeck.

== Ideology ==
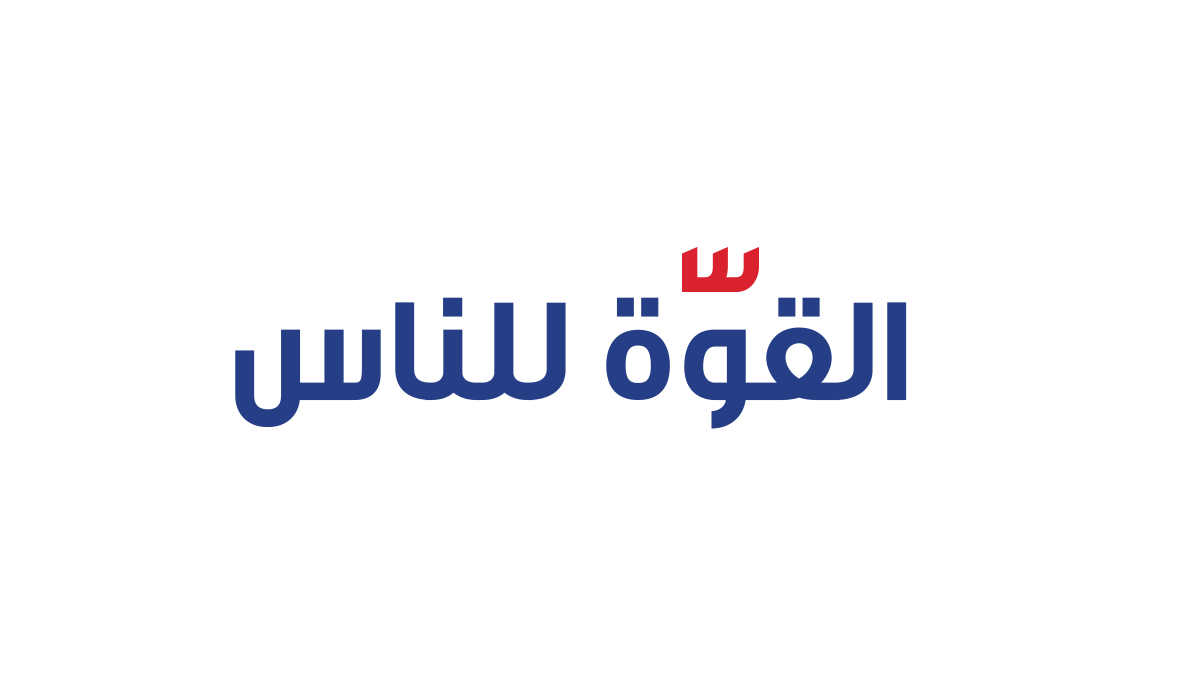
Lihaqqi's main slogan, Arabic for "power to the people". Pronounced: "al-quwwa lil naas"

Lihaqqi does not subscribe to a particular ideological dogma, or advocate any ideal social order as the final stage for humanity. Instead, the movement "offers a progressive approach that understands reality and works in a dynamic and participatory approach with people to chart the course." Lihaqqi's discourse and practices are inspired by a wide array of movements, and ideological diversity among members is accepted by the organization as a healthy and necessary part of political practice.

Lihaqqi's discourse can be associated with left-wing populism. The movement's most used slogan is "power to the people", and its discourse often revolves around the contrast between the interests of the overwhelming majority of people, and those of the ruling class, often named "the oligarchy". The group falls on the left side of the ideological spectrum in most of its positions, including on economic justice, gender and sexual rights, refugees and migrants' rights, and environmental policy. In the Lebanese context, the group calls for the end of the sectarian power-sharing regime through the establishment of a secular state, and the replacement of sectarian clientelist networks with a reliable social welfare system. It also advocates fair and decentralized structures of economic governance, including worker and farmer cooperatives, and many of its members have been involved in such projects.

In its political document, Lihaqqi states a number of values and political principles, including:

- Intersectionality
- Solidarity
- Economic and social justice
- Economic democracy
- Political and economic decentralization
- The right to political self-determination
- Pluralism
- Gender equality

== Structure and decision-making ==
Lihaqqi differs from most traditional political organizations and parties in the structure that it has adopted, where no hierarchy exists between members. The movement does not have a secretary general or president, neither is it led by any executive or central committee. Elected committees have tasks (as opposed to powers), and the general assembly can overturn any decisions by any elected committee through a quick internal petition. The organization's structure revolves around geographical, sectoral and thematic groups, called "grassroots" and "working groups". All these groups are entitled for autonomous self-management, and no central entity exists to supervise their work. Like elected committees, however, their decisions can be revoked by the general assembly if they are seen to be in violation of Lihaqqi's values or principles.

The group notes a number of organizational principles on its website:

- Decentralization
- Grassrootization
- Direct participatory democracy
- Justice and representation for women and people of non-normative gender and sexual identities

== See also ==
- 17 October Revolution
- Lebanon liquidity crisis
- Nizar Hassan
