= White White World =

- Film poster
- Serbian: Beli, beli svet
- Directed by: Oleg Novković
- Starring: Uliks Fehmiu; Hana Selimović
- Release dates: 6 August 2010 (Locarno); 30 November 2010
- Running time: 121 minutes
- Countries: Serbia; Germany; Sweden
- Language: Serbian

White White World (Serbian: Beli, beli svet) is a 2010 drama film directed by Oleg Novković. The film premiered at the 2010 Locarno Film Festival. Jasna Đuričić won Best Actress at the festival.

== Plot ==
The film is set in Bor, a declining mining town in southeastern Serbia. Kralj, a former miner who now owns a local bar, once had an affair with Ruzica, the wife of his boxing coach. After her husband discovered the relationship, Ruzica killed him and was sentenced to prison.

Seven years later, Ruzica returns to Bor and seeks out Kralj. She discovers that he has become involved with Rosa, her young daughter. Their relationship draws the three into a destructive conflict shaped by their shared past and the bleak circumstances of life in the town.

== Cast ==
- Uliks Fehmiu as Kralj
- Hana Selimović as Rosa
- Jasna Đuričić as Ruzica
- Nebojša Glogovac as Zlatan
- Boris Isaković as Beli
- Milica Mihajlović as Dara
- Marko Janketić as Tigar
- Meto Jovanovski as Crni
- Mira Banjac as Baba
