= Instructions for Survival =

2021 documentary film

- Directed by: Yana Ugrekhelidze
- Written by: Yana Ugrekhelidze
- Produced by: Yana Ugrekhelidze
- Cinematography: Jule Katinka Cramer
- Edited by: Agata Wozniak
- Music by: Lennart Saathoff
- Production company: FEM Management for Film
- Release date: 13 June 2021 (Berlin)
- Running time: 72 minutes
- Country: Germany
- Languages: Georgian; Russian; English

Instructions for Survival is a German documentary film, directed by Yana Ugrekhelidze and released in 2021. The film is a portrait of Alexander, a trans man living in Georgia who must carefully navigate secrecy about his gender identity while he and his wife undertake efforts to migrate to a safer country.

The film premiered in the Perspektive Deutsches Kino program at the 71st Berlin International Film Festival, where it won the Jury Award from the Teddy Award program for LGBTQ-related films. It was subsequently screened in the United States at the Ann Arbor Film Festival in April, where it won the award for Best Documentary Film, and in Canada at the Inside Out Film and Video Festival in May.
