= Eliane Raheb =

Lebanese documentary filmmaker (born 1972)

- إليان الراهب
- Born: 1972; Lebanon
- Occupations: Documentary filmmaker; director

Eliane Raheb (Arabic: إليان الراهب; born 1972) is a documentary filmmaker and director from Lebanon. She made her debut as a director with her 2012 film, Layali Bala Noom (Sleepless Nights). Her latest film is Miguel's War from 2021. That film received the Teddy Award for best LGBTW film at the 2021 Berlin International Film Festival.

== Early life and education ==
Eliane Raheb was born in 1972 in Lebanon, where she spent most of her youth during the Lebanese Civil War. In a 2014 interview, Raheb described her youth during the war: "I remember moving from one place to the next in search of shelter, like everyone else at the time. We lived through hard and painful moments. Despite that, we prevailed: we went to school and carried on with our lives... I will never forget the days of social harmony, when everyone would help the other." She was 19 when the war ended.

Raheb's grandfather owned a theatre in Zahlé that sparked her interest in film. She said her family often took refuge in her grandfather's theatre during the war and would watch films there. She began acting in theatre, working with Roger Assaf. Alongside acting, she began to write and direct theatre. Raheb then moved from theatre to film, studying at IESAV in Beirut.

== Career ==
=== Early career ===
Raheb's directorial debut was her 1995 short film The Last Screening, which revolves around the relationship between a girl and her grandfather's theatre. Raheb directed the 2002 documentary So Near Yet So Far, which is about the February 6 Intifada that squashed the hopes of visiting neighbouring countries for children living in Lebanon, Egypt, and Jordan.

Suicide (2003) documents the Lebanese response to the American invasion of Iraq, depicting intelligence agencies involved and those in Lebanon who accepted Iraqi propaganda and joined the fight.

With her 2008 documentary This Is Lebanon, Raheb documented the re-emergence of violence in Lebanon. The film follows the resistance against the establishment and the patriarchal family structure, which Raheb says are partly to blame for the political and religious sectarianism in Lebanon. This Is Lebanon was broadcast internationally on television by ARTE, ZDF, and Al Jadeed.

=== Sleepless Nights ===
In her 2012 documentary Sleepless Nights, Raheb explores the amnesty law that was granted to people who committed political crimes during the war and its effects on the victims and the perpetrators of these crimes. To that end, Sleepless Nights depicts the lives of Assaad Chaftari, an ex-intelligence officer and a high-ranking member of a right-wing militia, who killed many people; and Maryam Saiidi, whose son went missing in 1982. Raheb devised Sleepless Nights after taking an interest in Chaftari's story. Through her research and interview with him, Eliane covered the two conflicting narratives that are present in the film.

When Sleepless Nights was released, it had trouble getting large-scale distribution in Lebanon due to its documentarian nature. Instead, the film was screened in three Lebanese theatres through individual efforts on behalf of Raheb and her supporters. Future Television criticized Sleepless Nights, calling it a "failure" for having less than 700 views within one week of its release. However, the film was acclaimed and screened on various platforms, such as the Al Jazeera Documentary Channel and Al Jadeed. Jay Weissberg, writing for Variety, said, "It's hard to find a Lebanese film that doesn't focus on the bloody civil war. And yet it is even harder to find a film that treats this topic better than Sleepless Nights."

=== Those Who Remain ===
Her 2018 documentary Those Who Remain, which was screened at more than 20 festivals, is about a 60-year old Christian farmer living in North Lebanon who is struggling to stay in his land amid sectarian tensions. Raheb said, "I wanted to give the land a political, not only geographical, meaning".

=== Miguel's War ===
In 2021, Raheb produced and directed Miguel's War, a hybrid documentary which follows a gay man who returns to Lebanon after 37 years in exile in Spain. The film received the Teddy Award for best LGBTQ film at the 2021 Berlin International Film Festival.

== Other work ==
Raheb also supports the Lebanese film community by teaching filmmaking at the Saint Joseph University in Beirut and being active in Lebanese cultural organizations.

In 1999, she founded Beirut DC, a cultural association that supports and promotes the work of independent filmmakers in Lebanon through co-production and screenings. Viola Shafik, author of Arab Cinema: History and Cultural Identity, referred to Raheb's association Beirut DC as a "backbone of Lebanese alternative film art". Raheb has also been the artistic director of the Beirut Cinema Days film festival for six editions. "Ayam Bayrut al-sinim'iya" considered her touring Arab Film Week among her association's most effective cultural initiatives.

Together with producer Nizar Hassan, who produced Sleepless Nights, Raheb founded Free Arabs (2011-2012), an international multimedia documentary film project. Free Arabs produced 160 short films, all of which were made by young filmmakers from seven countries that took part in the Arab Spring. All 160 short documentaries, which depict the lives of Arabs during the revolutions, were published online. Raheb's Lebanese-based production company Itar Productions is active throughout the Arab world.

== Style and themes ==
Raheb is interested in Lebanese experiences. Commenting on her own work, Raheb stated, "In the absence of a film industry structure in Lebanon, short films have performed the invaluable task of chronicling life in Lebanon after the war. They provide the material for a potential cinema." She described that cinema is a tool that should be used to unravel Lebanon's past.

Raheb's childhood largely influenced her work. She said she "never understood the little wars within the big one". Later, she said, "The war lingers in my head, and I always search for it traces. So I wanted to ask my questions on the screen". She began working on her first socio-political documentary in 2000.

Raheb said of her objective style in Sleepless Nights: "In the field of cinema, objectivity is a big lie. I tried to be as objective as possible. That is why I did not make a film about the Lebanese Civil War. Rather, I made a film about two people who lived through the war. I began from that reality, to tell their story, not mine. This film is not a biased journalistic report; rather it is a creative work that identifies with the human: her emotions, fears, and dreams."

Because of its political nature, Raheb's work is largely documentary. She said; "I learned; ... through documentary, how to bring back the fiction ... so I am dealing with an issue that is important, but I am having real characters instead of having actors; but if I want to be cinematic, I have to deal with them as if they are characters in a film ... I have to give them the time to develop their own story with a dramatical line".

== Awards and nominations ==
Raheb's documentary This Is Lebanon received the Excellency Award at the Yamagata International Documentary Film Festival. At the Mumbai Film Festival, Suicide garnered second place; Sight & Sound included the film in its list of the 25 best international films of 2013. Suicide also won competitions including the Human Rights Prize at the Cine Invisible festival in Bilbao, Spain; an award for documentary films at the Birds Eye View Festival in London, and the full-length film competition at the LAIFF Festival in Argentina. Those Who Remain won the Special Jury Prize Muhr Feature Award at the 13th Dubai International Film Festival.

== Filmography ==
Year	Title	Role	Notes
1995	The Last Screening	director	short film
1996	Encounter	director	short film
2001	So Near Yet So Far	director	documentary
2003	Suicide	director	documentary
2008	This is Lebanon	director, writer	documentary
2012	Sleepless Nights	director, executive producer and researcher	documentary
2016	Those Who Remain	director, producer	documentary
2021	Miguel's War	director, producer	documentary

== See also ==
- List of female film and television directors
