= Boris Isaković =

Serbian actor

- Борис Исаковић
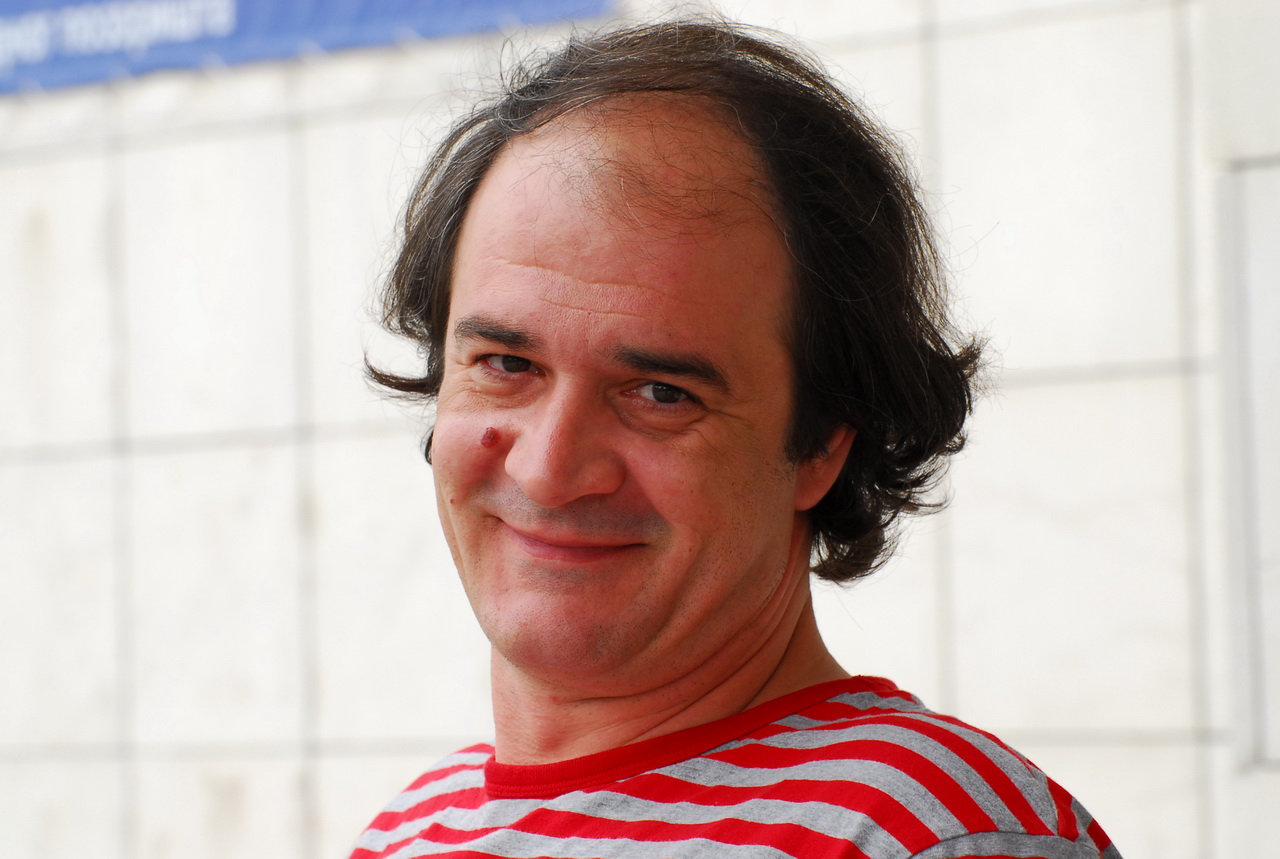
- Isaković in 2007
- Born: 14 December 1966 (age 59); Novi Sad, SR Serbia, SFR Yugoslavia
- Occupation: Actor
- Years active: 1990–present
- Spouse: Jasna Đuričić (m. 1996)
- Children: 2

Boris Isaković (Serbian Cyrillic: Борис Исаковић; born 14 December 1966) is a Serbian actor. He has appeared in more than thirty films since 1990. Internationally, he is best known for starring in Last Christmas (2019) and the Academy Award-nominated Quo Vadis, Aida? (2020).

== Personal life ==
He is married to Serbian actress Jasna Đuričić and together they reside in Novi Sad.

== Selected filmography ==
Year	Title	Role	Notes
1994	Vukovar, jedna priča	Toma	
1999	The Dagger	Hodža	
2004	When I Grow Up, I'll Be a Kangaroo	Ćelavi	
2007	Klopka	Moma	
2009	Ordinary People	Narednik	
2010	White White World	Beli	
2013	Circles	Todor	
2014	The Man Who Defended Gavrilo Princip	Franjo Svara	
2017	Requiem for Mrs. J.	Đorđe	
2017	Men Don't Cry	Miki	
2019	Last Christmas	Ivan Andrich	
2020	Quo Vadis, Aida?	General Ratko Mladić	
