= Jasna Đuričić =

Serbian actress (born 1966)

- Јасна Ђуричић
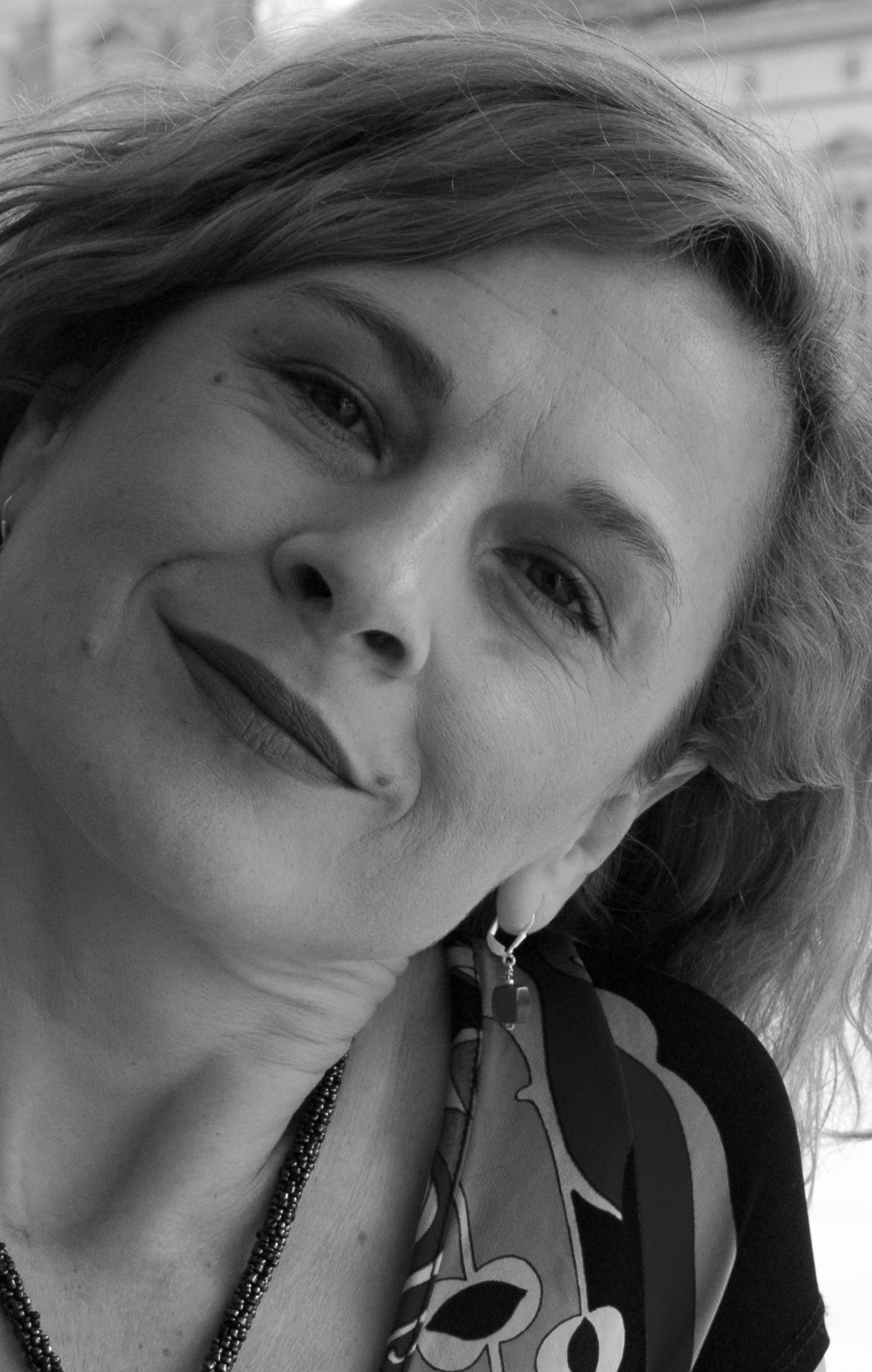
- Born: 16 April 1966 (age 60); Ruma, SR Serbia, SFR Yugoslavia
- Education: Academy of Arts
- Alma mater: University of Novi Sad
- Occupations: Actress, lecturer
- Spouse: Boris Isaković (m. 1996)
- Children: 2

Jasna Đuričić (Serbian Cyrillic: Јасна Ђуричић; born 16 April 1966) is a Serbian actress and academic, best known for playing the title role in the Bosnian film Quo Vadis, Aida?, which was nominated for the Academy Award for Best Foreign International Feature Film in 2021, and for which she was awarded the European Film Award for Best Actress. In Serbia, she is primarily renowned for her work in theater.

== Biography ==
Đuričić was born in Ruma, Serbia. She graduated from the Academy of Arts at the University of Novi Sad in 1989, where she studied under the noted Serbian actor Branko Pleša, and where she is herself now a professor of acting. Đuričić was a permanent member of the Serbian National Theatre in Novi Sad from 1990 until 2005.

In 2014, she was awarded Dobrica's Ring (Serbian: Добричин прстен, Dobrichin prsten), a lifetime achievement award given to noted Serbian actors.

At the 34th European Film Awards, Đuričić was awarded the Best Actress Award for her role in the Bosnian war film Quo Vadis, Aida?.

She currently lives in Novi Sad with her husband Boris Isaković, a fellow actor.

== Selected filmography ==
=== Film ===
Year	Title	Role	Notes
2010	White White World	Ruzica	
2013	For Those Who Can Tell No Tales	Edina	
2016	A Good Wife	Suzana	
2016	Train Driver's Diary	Sida	
2020	Quo Vadis, Aida?	Aida Selmanagić	

=== Television ===
Year	Title	Role	Notes
2023	I Know Your Soul	Nevena Murtezić	6 episodes

== Awards ==
- Best Actress Award at the Locarno International Film Festival for White White World (Beli beli svet) (2010)
- Best Actress Prize at the Les Arcs Film Festival for White White World (Beli beli svet) (2010)
- Best Actress Award at the El Gouna Film Festival for Quo Vadis, Aida? (2020)
- Best Actress Award at the 34th European Film Awards for Quo Vadis, Aida? (2021)
