= Quo Vadis, Aida? =

2020 film by Jasmila Žbanić

- Theatrical release poster
- Directed by: Jasmila Žbanić
- Written by: Jasmila Žbanić
- Based on: Under the UN Flag by Hasan Nuhanović
- Produced by: Damir Ibrahimović; Jasmila Žbanić
- Starring: Jasna Đuričić; Izudin Bajrović; Boris Isaković; Johan Heldenbergh; Raymond Thiry; Emir Hadžihafizbegović
- Cinematography: Christine A. Maier
- Edited by: Jarosław Kamiński
- Music by: Antoni Łazarkiewicz
- Production companies: Deblokada Film; Digital Cube; Coop99 Filmproduktion; N279 Entertainment; Razor Filmproduktion; Extreme Emotions; Indie Prod; Tordenfilm; TRT
- Release date: 3 September 2020 (Venice)
- Running time: 102 minutes
- Countries: Austria; Bosnia and Herzegovina; Croatia; France; Germany; Italy; Netherlands; Norway; Poland; Romania; Sweden; Turkey; Montenegro
- Languages: Bosnian; English; Serbian; Dutch
- Budget: €3.5–4 million
- Box office: $813,253

Quo Vadis, Aida? (Latin for 'Where are you going, Aida?') is a 2020 internationally co-produced war drama film written, produced and directed by Jasmila Žbanić, and based on Hasan Nuhanović's book Under the UN Flag. An international co-production of twelve production companies, the film was shown in the main competition section of the 77th Venice International Film Festival.

The film dramatizes the July 1995 Srebrenica massacre of over 8,300 Bosniak men and boys by the Bosnian Serb Army under the command of General Ratko Mladić (Boris Isaković) which was part of the wider Bosnian genocide in the Bosnian War. The plot focuses on Aida Selmanagić (Jasna Đuričić), a translator for the United Nations, who tries to juggle her professional obligations with attempts to save her husband (Izudin Bajrović) and two sons (Boris Ler and Dino Bajrović) from certain death.

Quo Vadis, Aida? earned a nomination for Best International Feature Film at the 93rd Academy Awards, and received two BAFTA Award nominations. It also won four European Film Awards, including Best Film.

A direct sequel titled Quo Vadis, Aida? - The Missing Part, and starring Jasna Đuričić, is expected to be released in 2027.

== Plot ==
The film opens with former secondary school teacher Aida Selmanagić translating the negotiations between the Dutchbat commander Thom Karremans and the Mayor of Srebrenica. The nervous Mayor questions Karremans about Dutchbat's plans in case NATO's airplanes do not come to aid them against the advancing Army of Republika Srpska (VRS); Karremans convinces him that the planes would come. In Aida's apartment, her husband Nihad and sons Hamdija and Sejo watch the news report on the VRS finally capturing the besieged Srebrenica, despite the town being designated a United Nations Safe Area. The Selmanagićs flee their apartment and go to the United Nations base in Potočari. A column of thousands of civilians march towards the base. The base, however, cannot take them all in. Aida is torn between her translating job at the base and the attempts to find her family, whom she lost in the crowd. She finds Sejo inside the base, and he tells her that Nihad and Hamdija are stuck outside.

VRS general Ratko Mladić takes a celebratory walk through the streets of destroyed Srebrenica, while showing off for the cameras and claiming the town has been liberated. The Dutch require three representatives of civilians in the base who will accompany them to the negotiations with Mladić. Aida manages to convince Major Rob Franken to take Nihad, since there weren't enough volunteers within the base. Under cover of night, with Franken's consent, Aida smuggles Nihad and Hamdija into the base. Nihad, alongside Muharem and Ćamila, accompanies Dutchbat at the negotiations. Mladić promises to let civilians leave the Srebrenica enclave for the ARBiH-controlled Kladanj with buses that he himself will provide. Nihad and the Dutch believe him, while Ćamila is aware Mladić plans to execute them all.

While Karremans is still with Mladić, VRS troops arrive to the UN base and demand to be let inside. Karremans orders Franken to let them in via a handheld transceiver. VRS commander Joka mocks the Bosniak men inside the base, and humiliates the civilians. The buses arrive and the VRS orders to separate the men from the women and children. Aida, now aware of her family's fate, begs the Dutch to protect them but they refuse to defy orders. Tarik, a fellow UN translator, adds Aida's family to the list of the base personnel in an attempt to protect them; the Dutch, however, cross them out.

While Aida struggles to hide her family in one of the machines in the base—which is an abandoned battery factory—outside, Mladić films himself promising safety to a bus full of Bosniak women. The Dutch help the VRS separate the men from the women and children. Some of them are even distressed by the cries of separated families, but do not react. Aida's family is found and taken away. At the last minute, Franken offers Nihad protection for his participation in the UN negotiations. Aida and Nihad try to get Franken to protect one of their sons instead, but Franken remains adamant. Nihad then boards one of the trucks together with his sons, along with other men, as devasted Aida cries and screams after them. The truck arrives at Dom Kulture in Pilica and the men are grouped inside. Machine guns emerge from outside the building through its windows, opening fire on the men inside. The residents of Pilica drink their coffee around the building, while the sounds of gunfire pierce the air.

Time has passed. Aida returns to her family apartment in Srebrenica, which she fled from in the film's opening minutes. She meets with Vesna, a young Serb woman, and her little son, who now live there. Vesna returns her family photos; Aida tells her to move out as soon as possible. When Vesna expresses concern for Aida's safety, Aida replies that she has nothing left to lose. On the staircase, she passes and says hi to Joka, who doesn't recognize her; a second later she realizes that he is Vesna's husband and that he lives in her apartment. Aida goes to identify remains dug up from mass graves; in the mass of remains, she recognizes Nihad's and Sejo's by their clothing. She burst into tears. Some time later, Aida is shown working as an elementary school teacher. As she supervises the children's school play, the camera shows the perpetrators and victims of the massacre in the audience, including Joka and Vesna.

== Cast ==
- Jasna Đuričić as Aida Selmanagić, based on Hasan Nuhanović
- Izudin Bajrović as Nihad Selmanagić, based on Ibro Nuhanović
- Boris Isaković as General Ratko Mladić
- Johan Heldenbergh as Colonel Thom Karremans
- Raymond Thiry as Major Rob Franken
- Boris Ler as Hamdija Selmanagić, based on Nasiha Nuhanović
- Dino Bajrović as Sead "Sejo" Selmanagić, based on Muhamed "Braco" Nuhanović
- Reinout Bussemaker as Colonel Dr. Robben
- Juda Goslinga as Lieutenant Rutten
- Jelena Kordić-Kuret as Ćamila, based on Ćamila Omanović
- Rijad Gvozden as Muharem, based on Nesib Mandžić
- Emir Hadžihafizbegović as Joka, based on Milenko Stanić
- Edita Malovčić as Vesna, based on Vesna Stanić
- Teun Luijkx as Captain Mintjes
- Joes Brauers as Boudwijn
- Ermin Bravo as the Mayor, based on Fahrudin Salihović
- Sol Vinken as Soldier Lammerts
- Micha Hulshof as Major De Haan
- Alban Ukaj as Tarik, based on Emir Suljagić
- Ermin Sijamija as Lalović

== Production ==
=== Writing ===
Jasmila Žbanić and her husband Damir Ibrahimović found the basis for the film in Under the UN Flag, a book by the Srebrenica survivor Hasan Nuhanović who worked as a translator at the UN base in Potočari. They obtained the rights and started working on the screenplay with Nuhanović. Nuhanović left the project due to creative differences between him and Žbanić, who thought that changing the protagonist to a woman would allow the audience to connect with them better. Nuhanović also found the process of writing the screenplay too painful.

Thom Karremans refused to meet Žbanić, so she consulted with David Harland, former UN chief of civil affairs for Bosnia and Herzegovina, who investigated UN reports on what happened in Srebrenica. In the meantime, Ibrahimović found that it was impossible to fund the film solely from Bosnia and Herzegovina, so companies from Austria, France, Germany, Netherlands, Norway, Poland, Romania and Turkey joined the production. However, the complexity of the production made the funding difficult. Žbanić and Ibrahimović then assembled all the producers at the 69th Berlin International Film Festival and held a meeting. Ibrahimović convinced them to start pre-production, claiming that the project would "die" otherwise. Despite running out of money halfway through production, Ibrahimović secured funds with a €500,000 loan from a bank.

In order to create a world for the film for viewers to enter, Žbanić analyzed authentic war videos on YouTube, as well as videos she received surreptitiously. She had access to seven hours of video footage of how Dutch soldiers lived and what life was like at the base. This helped her with the set design details and the spirit of the UN base. To Jutarnji list, Žbanić stated that, "for the Dutch, Bosnian Muslims were not human beings equal to them." However, she praised the Dutch actors, producers and foundation for their eagerness to participate in the film: "In any case, Srebrenica is a great trauma for the Netherlands. [...] That is the difference between us and real democratic societies. Their citizens know that this act was shameful and it does not occur to them to relativize or deny the event."

=== Casting ===
Serbian actress Jasna Đuričić was the first choice for the role of the protagonist. Đuričić and Žbanić had previously worked together on For Those Who Can Tell No Tales (2013). When it came to the role of Ratko Mladić, Žbanić at one point considered not showing him at all, but filming him from behind. However, the idea was abandoned because the director did not want to mystify him or "give him some kind of aura that did not belong to him". Đuričić's husband Boris Isaković was hesitant to accept the role of Ratko Mladić due to the Mladić's perceived heroism among Bosnian Serbs, and was subjected to pressure in Serbia after accepting it.

Many of the film's extras survived horrors of war themselves. One day, filming was even interrupted after two women, who were Srebrenica survivors themselves, got upset at the sight of Isaković in the role of Mladić.

=== Filming ===
Žbanić connected with the Mothers of Srebrenica and held theatre workshops for local children with the aim of encouraging coexistence; however, she and Ibrahimović believed that filming in the town of Srebrenica would be impossible, as it is situated in Republika Srpska and predominantly populated by Serbs. Mladen Grujičić, the mayor of Srebrenica at the time, even denied the genocide and had never visited the Srebrenica Genocide Memorial.

Filming began in July 2019 in the Herzegovinian towns of Mostar and Stolac. The production struggled to secure military equipment for the filming, as Bosnian Serb officials denied their requests. An unnamed friend of Ibrahimović pulled some strings with an unnamed minister and got two tanks for the filming. The filming was finished in September 2019.

== Release ==
The film had its world premiere at the 77th Venice International Film Festival on 3 September 2020. It was also screened at the 2020 Toronto International Film Festival on 13 September 2020. On 10 October 2020, the film had its Bosnian-Herzegovinian premiere at the Srebrenica Genocide Memorial. In February 2021, Super LTD acquired U.S. distribution rights to the film. It was released in the United States through virtual cinema on 5 March 2021, followed by video on demand on 15 March 2021.

== Historical accuracy ==
The Nuhanović family—Nasiha and Ibro, and their sons Hasan and Muhamed—served as the basis for the film's Selmanagić family. The role of the UN translator was, however, shifted from the son Hasan Nuhanović to the matriarch Aida Selmanagić. Hasan, just like Aida, unsuccessfully attempted to get the Dutch to protect his family. Ibro Nuhanović did go to negotiate with Ratko Mladić, just like Nihad Selmanagić. The characters of Ćamila and Muharem were based on the real-life people Ćamila Omanović and Nesib Mandžić. Unlike the character of Ćamila, who was groped by a Serb soldier while searched for weapons before entering the building to negotiate, the real-life Ćamila Omanović was allowed to enter the building without being searched at all.

The negotiations scene was a recreation of the documentary footage: Ćamila did reveal that she had two children and a grandchild, to which Mladić expressed surprise that she is already a grandmother at her age, and she did identify one of Mladić's men as her former classmate. Ćamila's son Đermin Omanović revealed that Ćamila heard another one of her Serb former classmates threatening with roasting "children on a spit". Distressed, Ćamila unsuccessfully attempted suicide at one point. She later urged Đermin and Đermin's sister to separate from her, because she feared they would indeed get skewered on a spit if seen with her. When convoys started leaving the UN base for Tuzla, she managed to get on board with her children and grandchild. Đermin, who was 14 years old at the time, testified that she jumped out of the truck as soon as it departed, because she did not want to risk her children's lives. Đermin and his sister arrived to Kladanj, while Ćamila managed to get to Tuzla after all. Later, she testified at the International Criminal Tribunal for the former Yugoslavia (ICTY), and died in 2007 from a heart attack. Nesib Mandžić, just like Muharem in the film, was told by Mladić that he held the destiny of his people in his hands.

The real-life UN translator Emir Suljagić served as the basis for the character of Tarik. Just like Tarik attempted to rescue the Selmanagić family, Suljagić tried to rescue Muhamed Nuhanović listing him as the member of the base's personnel. Muhamed, just like the Selmanagić family, was crossed out by the Dutch and was expelled from the base. Suljagić also made another list, writing down the names of all 239 civilians inside of the base, including his grandfather Sadik Hasanović, an imam. Suljagić added Hasan Nuhanović's parents and brother later; all 239 were expelled from the base.

Just like Aida begged the Dutch to protect her family, Hasan Nuhanović begged them to protect his. Muhamed Nuhanović, just like Sejo Selmanagić, rebelliously put out his cigarette, told Hasan (i.e. Aida in the film) not to beg anymore, and left with the Serbs. On 11 July 1995, Muhamed was twelve days shy of his 21st birthday, unlike Sejo who was 17 years old in the film. Hasan identified Muhamed's remains by the clothing, just like Aida did in the film. Ibro's remains had Hasan's UN ID with them; Hasan had given it to Muhamed, hoping it would have saved him somehow, and stated that he takes that as proof that Muhamed and Ibro were together.

Ibro and Muhamed were buried in the Branjevo primary mass grave, and their remains were later relocated to the Čančari Road secondary mass graves near Kamenica. Ibro and Muhamed were most likely executed in the Dom Kulture club in Pilica near Zvornik; this was also depicted in the film. Dom Kulture was notable for its location in the town centre, unlike all other execution sites which were on remote locations; this was also reflected in the film, which shows Serb residents of the town drinking coffee on their balconies while gunshots are heard from Dom Kulture. According to Dražen Erdemović's ICTY testimony, he and his VRS comrades were indeed sitting in a pub in Pilica across from Dom Kulture while gunshots and explosions could be heard from inside the building. Nasiha Nuhanović left the UN base for Kladanj on one of the buses from the convoy, but she was separated from her companions before reaching the town. She, alongside six more people, was taken to Jarovlje near Vlasenica where they were executed and their bodies burned; her remains were found at a garbage dump near Vlasenica in 2009.

In charge of Vlasenica was Milenko Stanić, who served as a loose basis for the character of Joka. His family did move into the Nuhanović family's apartment. Unlike Joka's wife Vesna in the film, the real-life Vesna Stanić chased Hasan Nuhanović away from the apartment's front door in 2000 and did not give him his family photographs. At that time, Milenko Stanić was the president of Serb Democratic Party's Vlasenica branch. Hasan received his family's photographs in 2002 in Sarajevo, from a Serb lady who was his Serb friend's girlfriend's mother. She lived in the Nuhanović apartment after the Nuhanovićs fled and before the Stanićs moved in. As with Aida in the film, these photographs are Hasan's only memories of his dead family.

== Reception ==
=== Critical response ===
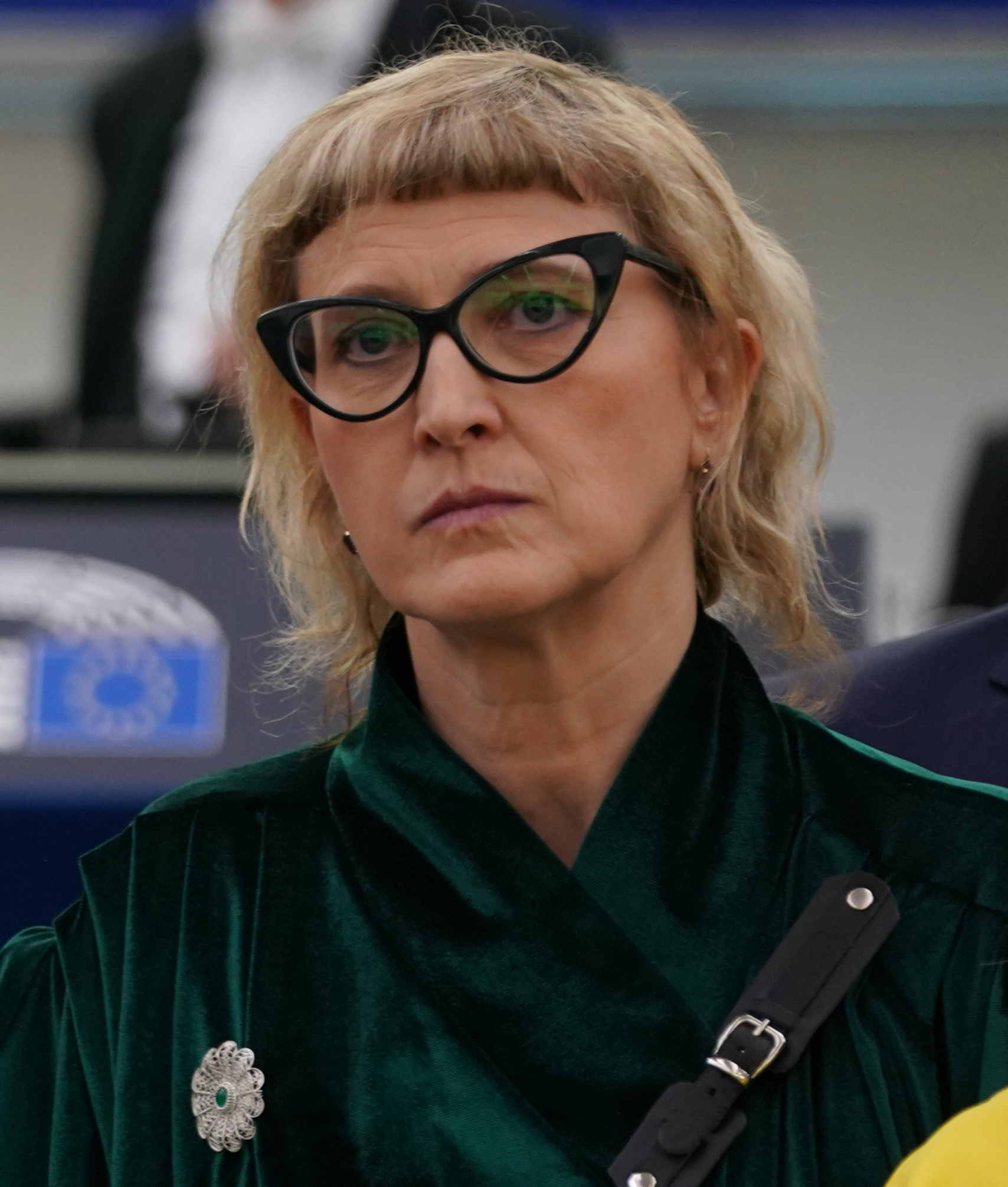
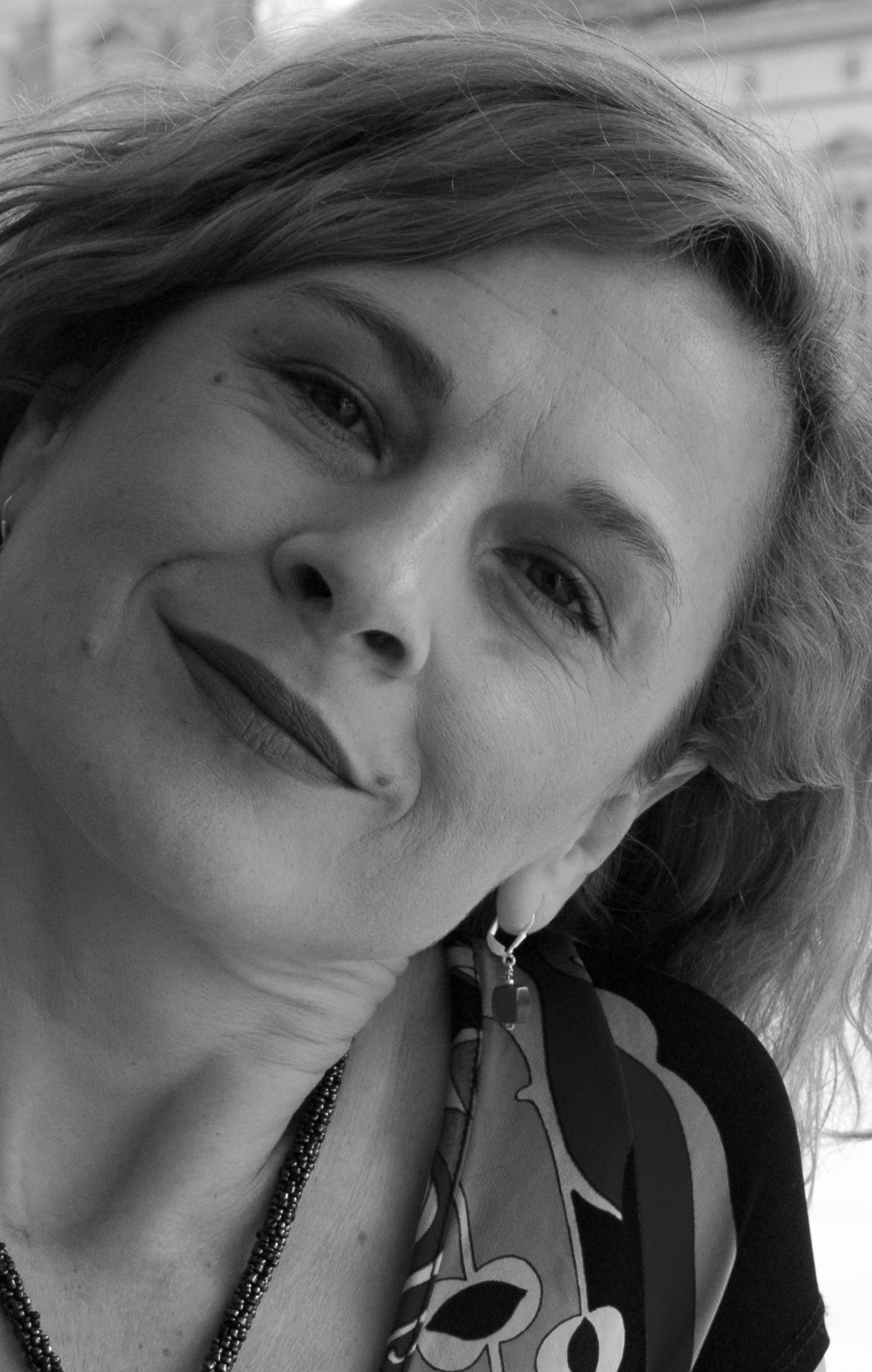
Jasmila Žbanić (left) received critical acclaim for her screenplay and direction, and Jasna Đuričić for her performance in the film

On Rotten Tomatoes, 100% of 78 critic reviews are positive, and the average rating is 8.8/10. The critics consensus on the website states: "Quo Vadis, Aida? uses one woman's heartbreaking conflict to offer a searing account of war's devastating human toll." According to Metacritic, the film received "universal acclaim" based on a weighted average score of 97 out of 100 from 16 critic reviews. It was declared Metacritic's Official Best Movie of 2021 and Best International Movie of 2021.

Ryan Gilbey of New Statesman stated "Žbanić has shaped the factual into an eloquent and conscientious picture that purrs along as suspensefully as any ticking-bomb thriller, using Ðuričić's performance as its engine." Jude Dry of IndieWire wrote that "Žbanić lays bare the deeply human toll of violence and war", and Peter Bradshaw wrote in The Guardian that "after 25 years, the time has come to look again at the horror of Srebrenica, and Žbanić has done this with clear-eyed compassion and candor." Jessica Kiang for Variety states that "this is not historical revisionism, if anything, Quo Vadis, Aida? works to un-revise history, re-centering the victims' plight as the eye of a storm of evils—not only the massacre itself, but the broader evils of institutional failure and international indifference." Kevin Maher writes in The Times that "it's incendiary, furiously committed film-making from the director Jasmila Žbanić, who also adds an unnerving ending about the burden that Srebrenica survivors still bear."

"The final act of Quo Vadis, Aida . . . makes clear that many other perpetrators escaped with impunity," writes film critic A. O. Scott in The New York Times. "The war ended, and some version of normalcy returned, but Žbanić takes no consolation in the banal observation that life goes on. It's true that time passes, that memory fades, that history is a record of mercy as well as of savagery. But it's also true—as this unforgettable film insists—that loss is permanent and unanswerable."

Jurica Pavičić of Jutarnji list praised Žbanić for making a film about the Srebrenica genocide, deeming it "the riskiest move of not only the Sarajevan filmmaker, but the entire Bosnian-Herzegovinian cinema." He further praised her for managing to deal with the subject without swerving into "chauvinist slop", unlike the Croatian films from the 1990s, despite his initial scepticism. He finally compared Srebrenica in the aftermath of the massacre to Vukovar in the aftermath of the Vukovar massacre: "In Vukovar, the Croat majority is in power, and what's more – Croatian nationalism embodied in Ivan Penava. Srebrenica, on the other hand, ended up within the territorial scope of Republika Srpska and Dodik's party [SNSD] is in power. One would say: as if the crime in Srebrenica – paid off." Writing for the same publication, Nenad Polimac praised Žbanić's decision to focus on Aida's desperation and hysteria as she's trying to save her family, and not the horrors taking place in and around the town: "In this regard, Quo Vadis, Aida? is a virtuoso directed film in which Žbanić demonstrated a skill we had no idea she possessed. [...] Overall, Jasmila Žbanić made a very brave film about a delicate subject, which most of her colleagues would have turned into a pathetic epic, but she stuck to her concept and didn't make (too many) mistakes."

Hasan Nuhanović, however, criticised some scenes from the film, namely the scene when Emir Hadžihafizbegović's character demands to be let into the UN base: "The point of the film was not supposed to be the arrogance of the Serb forces towards UNPROFOR, but rather a deliberate action by the Serb side to show the world a civilized face, while killing, shooting, and slaying Bosniaks, while at the same time UNPROFOR was busy with themselves. Go there, to the left, etc., all cultured, civilized, until the victim steps in front of the machine guns."

=== Accolades ===
In September 2020, Quo Vadis, Aida? was selected as the Bosnian entry for the Best International Feature Film at the 93rd Academy Awards, making the shortlist of fifteen films. On 15 March 2021, the film was officially recognized as a nominee in that category. It won the Audience Award at the 50th edition of the International Film Festival Rotterdam and the Best International Film Award at the 2021 Gothenburg Film Festival. The film was also nominated for and later on won the Best International Film Award at the 36th Independent Spirit Awards. In March 2021, 74th British Academy Film Awards nominated the film for Best Film Not in the English Language and Žbanić earned a nomination in the Best Director category.

In December 2021, Quo Vadis, Aida? won the Award for Best Film at the 34th European Film Awards. Also, Žbanić won the Award for Best Director and Jasna Đuričić won the Award for Best Actress at the same awards.

==== Awards ====
Award	Date of ceremony	Category	Recipient(s)	Result	Ref.
Venice Film Festival	12 September 2020	Golden Lion	Quo Vadis, Aida?	Nominated	
Venice Film Festival	12 September 2020	Brian Award	Quo Vadis, Aida?	Won	
International Film Festival Rotterdam	7 February 2021	Audience Award	Quo Vadis, Aida?	Won	
Gothenburg Film Festival	8 February 2021	Best International Film Award	Quo Vadis, Aida?	Won	
BAFTA Awards	10 April 2021	Best Director	Jasmila Žbanić	Nominated	
BAFTA Awards	10 April 2021	Best Film Not in the English Language	Quo Vadis, Aida?	Nominated	
Independent Spirit Awards	22 April 2021	Best International Film	Quo Vadis, Aida?	Won	
Academy Awards	25 April 2021	Best International Feature Film	Quo Vadis, Aida?	Nominated	
European Film Awards	11 December 2021	Best Film	Quo Vadis, Aida?	Won	
European Film Awards	11 December 2021	University Film Award	Quo Vadis, Aida?	Nominated	
European Film Awards	11 December 2021	Best Director	Jasmila Žbanić	Won	
European Film Awards	11 December 2021	Best Screenwriter	Jasmila Žbanić	Nominated	
European Film Awards	11 December 2021	Best Actress	Jasna Đuričić	Won	
Los Angeles Film Critics Association Awards	18 December 2021	Best Foreign Language Film	Quo Vadis, Aida?	Runner-up	
Gaudí Awards	6 March 2022	Best European Film	Quo Vadis, Aida?	Nominated	
European Film Awards	10 December 2022	Lux Award	Quo Vadis, Aida?	Won	

== See also ==
- List of submissions to the 93rd Academy Awards for Best International Feature Film
- List of Bosnian submissions for the Academy Award for Best International Feature Film
