= Courage (2021 film) =

2021 German documentary film

- Theatrical release poster
- Directed by: Aliaksei Paluyan
- Produced by: Jörn Möllenkamp
- Cinematography: Tanya Haurylchyk, Jesse Mazuch
- Edited by: Behrooz Karamizade
- Production company: Living Pictures Production
- Distributed by: Rise and Shine
- Release date: 2 March 2021 (Berlin International Film Festival)
- Running time: 90 minutes
- Country: Germany
- Languages: Belarusian; Russian

Courage is a 2021 German documentary film written and directed by Aliaksei Paluyan. It follows an underground theatre group Belarus Free Theatre during the 2020–2021 Belarusian protests.

The film had its worldwide premiere at the 71st Berlin International Film Festival in the Special section. The film was also nominated for the Berlinale Documentary Film Award.

== Accolades ==
Courage won The Cinema for Peace Award for The Political Film of the Year in 2022.

Award	Date of ceremony	Category	Result	Ref.
71st Berlin International Film Festival	13 June 2021	Documentary Film Award	Nominated	
Visions du Réel	24 April 2021	Grand Prix - International Feature Film Competition	Nominated	
Sheffield DocFest	14 June 2021	Tim Hetherington Award	Nominated	
Biografilm Festival	12 June 2021	Best International Documentary	Nominated	
Biografilm Festival	12 June 2021	Best Debut Film	Won	
Kraków Film Festival	3 June 2021	Best Feature-Length Documentary	Nominated	
Millennium Docs Against Gravity	9 September 2021	TVP Dokument Award	Won	
Tempo Documentary Festival	12 March 2022	Best International Documentary	Won	
The Cinema for Peace Award	26 February 2023	The political Film of the Year in 2022	Won	
