= Olga Lucovnicova =

Moldovan film director and cinematographer

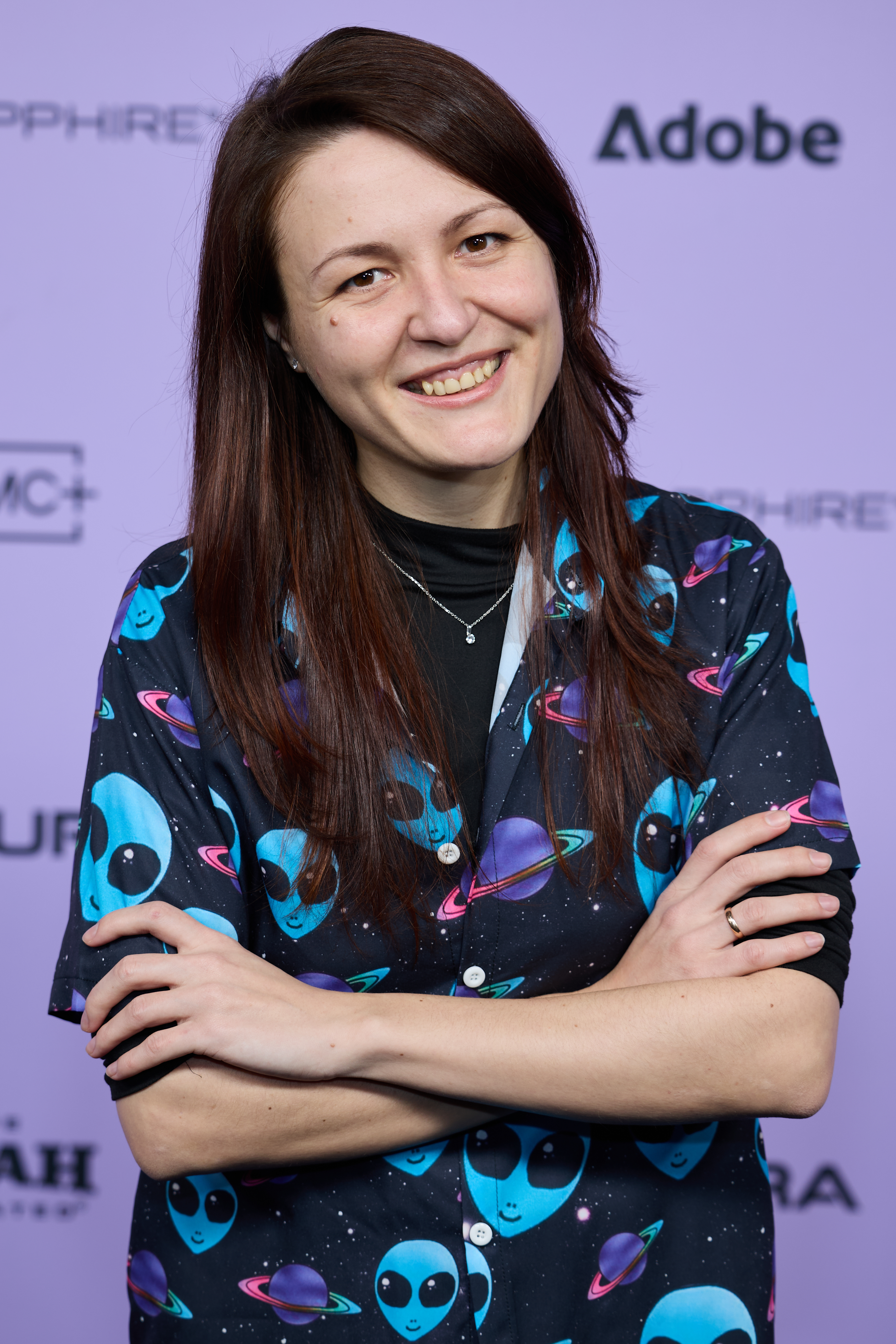
- Lucovnicova at the 2024 Sundance Film Festival
- Born: July 1, 1991 (age 35); Moldova
- Occupations: Film Director, Cinematographer
- Known for: "Nanu Tudor" (My Uncle Tudor)
- Awards: Golden Bear for Best Short Film at Berlinale 2021

Olga Lucovnicova (born 1 July 1991 in Moldova) is a Moldovan film director and cinematographer, best known for her documentary Nanu Tudor (My Uncle Tudor), which won the Golden Bear for Best Short Film at the Berlin International Film Festival in 2021.

== Early life and education ==
Lucovnicova was born in Moldova and initially trained as an accountant before pivoting to photography. She pursued her education in cinematography at the Academy of Fine Arts in Chișinău starting in 2011.

After graduating, in 2018/2020 she received a scholarship for the DocNomads Master's program in Documentary Film at universities in Portugal, Hungary and Belgium.

== Career ==
Her film Nanu Tudor has been recognized at for its personal and powerful narrative. The documentary explores Lucovnicova's own experiences, bringing intimate and poignant stories to a wider audience.

She won a Short Film Honorable Mention at the 2021 Festival du nouveau cinéma. She won a Retrospective Audience Award, at the 2023 Leiden Shorts. She won Best Short Film, at the 34th European Film Awards.

== Filmography ==
- Nanu Tudor (My Uncle Tudor) 2021
- Last Letters From My Grandma, 2021
- Object 817, 2023
