= Forest – I See You Everywhere =

2021 drama film

- Film poster
- Hungarian: Rengeteg – mindenhol látlak
- Directed by: Bence Fliegauf
- Screenplay by: Bence Fliegauf
- Starring: Laura Podlovics; István Lénárt; Lilla Kizlinger; Zsolt Végh; László Cziffer; Juli Jakab; Ági Gubík
- Release date: March 2021 (Berlinale)
- Country: Hungary
- Language: Hungarian

Forest – I See You Everywhere (Hungarian: Rengeteg – mindenhol látlak) is a 2021 Hungarian drama film written and directed by Bence Fliegauf. The film stars Laura Podlovics, István Lénárt, Lilla Kizlinger, Zsolt Végh, László Cziffer, Juli Jakab, and Ági Gubík.

The film had its worldwide premiere at the 71st Berlin International Film Festival in March 2021.

== Cast ==
The cast include:

- Juli Jakab
- Laszlo Cziffer
- Lilla Kizlinger
- Zsolt Vegh
- Istvan Lenart
- Eszter Balla
- Natasa Kovalik
- Agi Gubik
- Mihaly Vig
- Felician Keresztes
- Eliza Sodro
- Terence Gabor Gelencser
- Janos Fliegauf
- Peter Fancsikai
- Zoltan Pinter
- Laura Podlovics

== Release ==
On February 11, 2021, Berlinale announced that the film would have its worldwide premiere at the 71st Berlin International Film Festival in the Berlinale Competition section, in March 2021.
