= Nizar Hassan =

Lebanese journalist and researcher

- Born: Nizar Hassan; Lebanon
- Education: SOAS University of London, American University of Beirut
- Known for: Co-founder of LiHaqqi
- Awards: Open Society Foundations fellowship, International Labor Union Migration Journalism fellowship, Chevening Scholarship
- Scientific career
- Fields: Political Economy, Social Movements

Nizar Hassan is a Lebanese activist, journalist, podcaster and social researcher, focused on political economy and social movements, especially concerning Lebanon. He is co-founder of the Lebanese political organization LiHaqqi, which ran candidates for the Lebanese general elections of 2018 and 2022, having served as its spokesperson on multiple occasions. He has been a regular author analyzing Lebanese political affairs for the newspapers L'Orient-Le Jour, The New Arab, The Daily Star and Al-Arab, with contributions to ROAR magazine, Bretton Woods Project, Al Bawaba, BirGün or Green Left.

== Education and research ==
Hassan studied Political Sciences and Media at the American University of Beirut and Paris Sciences Po. He holds a master's degree in "Labor, Social Movements and Development" from SOAS University of London. His dissertation analyzed class and power in the 2015-2016 Lebanese protests. He has research works analyzing Lebanese political platforms, workers exclusion, the impact of the Syrian refugee crisis in Lebanon, the 2019 Lebanese uprising, and several short research analyses on various Lebanese issues. He has worked as a researcher for several civil society organizations, such as the Arab NGO Network for Development or the Lebanese Center for Policy Studies, and was selected as panel moderator at the World Bank's Civil Society Policy Forum. For his work, he has received the Open Society Foundations fellowship, the International Labor Union Migration Journalism fellowship and the Chevening scholarship.

== Activism and social engagement ==
He is co-founder of the Lebanese political organization LiHaqqi, the first organization to call for protests that triggered the 17 October Revolution. LiHaqqi also ran candidates on the Lebanese general elections of 2018 and 2022. He has served as its spokesperson in multiple occasions. Within LiHaqqi, he served on the Public Affairs Committee, Organizational Council, and Economic Justice Working Group. He is the co-host of the Lebanese Politics Podcast and the host of the YouTube channel Tafkeek, funded by the Open Society Foundations.

== Political views and analyses ==
His political analyses have often been cited worldwide when analyzing Lebanese events, especially after the Lebanese 17 October Revolution. Referred to as a "protagonist in the contemporary Lebanese scene" and "a central part of the grassroots movement in Beirut", he supports progressive policies on multiple topics. He considers current Lebanese financial crisis a "total economic and financial collapse" because of the lack of access to "basic necessities". He speaks critically of the Lebanese political system, calling it "corrupt sectarian political establishment" and "political clientelism", criticizing the banking sector as "financial oligarchy" and Hezbollah armed strength. He has also been a critic of multiple Lebanese politicians, such as prime minister Saad Hariri, prime minister Hassan Diab, or Druze leader Walid Jumblatt.

When discussing the aims of the 17 October Revolution, which he called "uprising of dignity", he expressed support for an interim government of independents from traditional parties to fight corruption and save the country, "not save capital". He also supported taxing millionaires to alleviate the financial crisis. He argues "the revolution has not failed" although it did not "achieve a lot".

== See also ==
- LiHaqqi
- 17 October Revolution
