= Natural Light (film) =

2021 drama film

- Hungarian: Természetes fény
- Directed by: Dénes Nagy
- Screenplay by: Dénes Nagy
- Based on: Természetes fény by Pál Závada
- Produced by: Sára László; Marcell Gerő; Caroline Piras; Inese Boka; Melanie Blocksdorf
- Starring: Ferenc Szabó; László Bajkó; Tamás Garbacz; Gyula Franczia
- Cinematography: Tamás Dobos
- Edited by: Nicolas Rumpl
- Music by: Santa Ratniece
- Production companies: Mistrus Media; Lilith Films; Propeller Film; NOVAK Prod; Proton Cinema
- Release date: March 1, 2021 (Berlinale)
- Running time: 103 minutes
- Countries: Hungary; Latvia; France; Germany
- Language: Hungarian

Natural Light (Hungarian: Természetes fény) is a Hungarian-French-German drama film written and directed by Dénes Nagy, based on the novel Természetes fény by Pál Závada. The film stars Ferenc Szabó, László Bajkó, Tamás Garbacz and Gyula Franczia.

The film had its worldwide premiere at the 71st Berlin International Film Festival in March 2021, where it won the Silver Bear for Best Director.

== Plot ==
The plot takes places during the second World War and shows the war through the eyes of one character, taken from the novel.

== Cast ==
The cast include:

- Ferenc Szabó as Semetka
- Tamás Garbacz as Szrnka
- László Bajkó as Koleszár
- Gyula Franczia as Major
- Ernő Stuhl as Vucskán
- Gyula Szilágyi as Csorin
- Mareks Lapeskis as Mihail
- Krisztián Kozó as Kozó
- Csaba Nánási as Nánási
- Zsolt Fodor as Fodor

== Release ==
On February 11, 2021, Berlinale announced that the film would have its worldwide premiere at the 71st Berlin International Film Festival in the Berlinale Competition section, in March 2021.
