= Benedek Fliegauf =

Hungarian film director and screenwriter

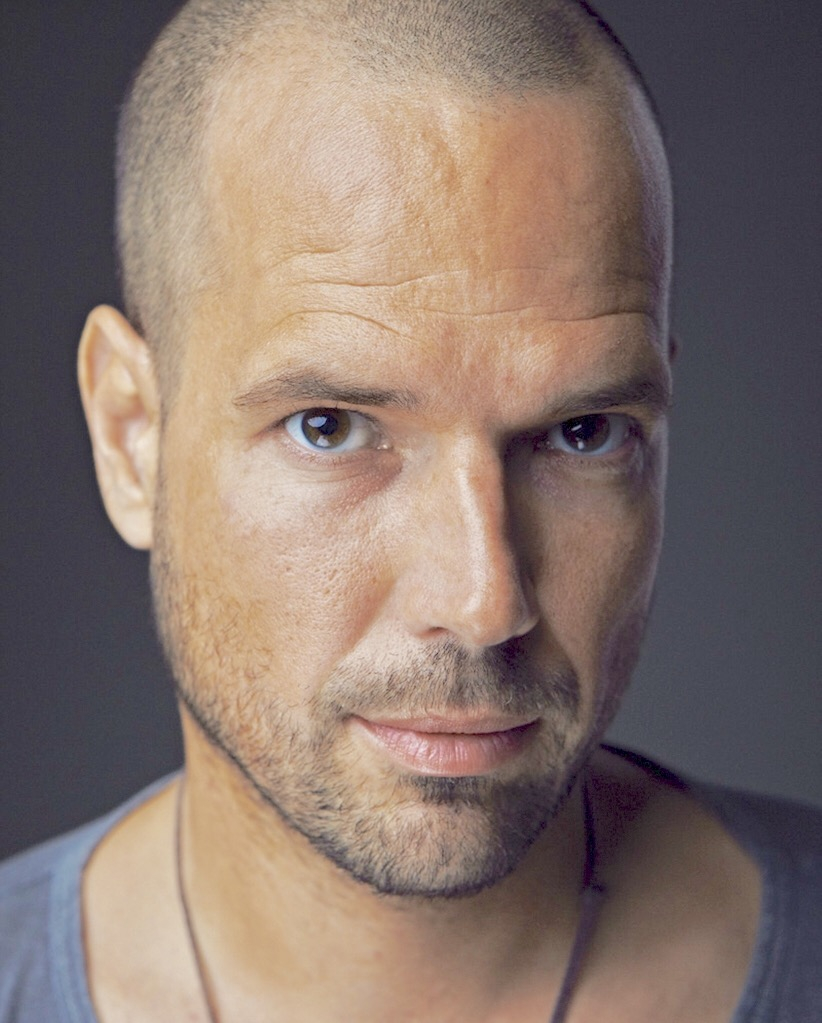

Benedek "Bence" Fliegauf (born 15 August 1974 in Budapest) is a Hungarian film director and screenwriter.

== Life and career ==
Originally Fliegauf planned to become a writer. However, he had to abandon his plans due to a lack of finances. Instead, Fliegauf studied to become a stage designer between 1995 and 1998 and was hired as an assistant at Hungarian Television where he went on to become a director and editor. As assistant director, he studied under Miklós Jancsó and Árpád Sopsits. Fliegauf, who never attended film school, made his directorial debut in 1999 with the documentary Határvonal. Success first came with Beszélő fejek (2001), a film made up of six stories of everyday urban life. Fliegauf received the Award for Best Experimental Film at the Hungarian Film Week for this 27-minute short film. Positive critical acclaim continued with his next documentary, Van élet a halál előtt? (2002), and the 15-minute short film Hypnosis.

In 2003, Fliegauf directed his first feature film. Balanced between comedy and drama, Rengeteg tells stories about the lives of young Hungarians living in Budapest. The film was shot in digital, with amateur actors in leading roles. Rengeteg was invited to the International Forum of New Cinema of the Berlin International Film Festival and was awarded there with the Wolfgang Staudte Prize. According to the German Filmdienst magazine, the elliptical drama and documentary style of Rengeteg resembled the works of the Danish Dogme movement. Fliegauf himself stated, however, that he had applied the aesthetics of the Budapest School of the 1970s following the work of his famous fellow countryman Béla Tarr.

2004 saw Fliegauf achieve great international success with his second feature film, Dealer, which was also invited to the International Forum of New Cinema at the Berlin International Film Festival. This psychological profile of an emotionally devastated young drug dealer (played by Felícián Keresztes) who ends up killing himself was shot, like many of his other films, without subsidies, with a small team, mobile digital cameras, amateur actors and the help of friends and social networks. Filmdienst praised Fliegauf for his dark, minimalist episodic film, listing him among the most promising young directors besides György Pálfi. Again, his work was compared to the cinema of Béla Tarr and Andrei Tarkovsky, although Fliegauf himself pointed to David Lynch and Sergio Leone as sources of inspiration. The Tageszeitung also praised Dealer as difficult to sit through, but a must-see film. Dealer won several prizes at international festivals, including the Best Director Award at the Festival Internacional de Cine de Mar del Plata and the Hungarian Film Week.

After the success of Dealer, Fliegauf shot two short films in the following years (A sor, 2004; Pörgés, 2005) and returned to feature film in 2007 with Tejút, which brought him the Golden Leopard at the Locarno International Film Festival in the "Filmmakers of the Present" category. The success of Dealer made it possible for him to stage his first English-language feature film in 2010. A European co-production, Womb tells the story of a young woman (played by Eva Green) who cannot get over the loss of her childhood sweetheart. She has his body cloned, carries the baby herself and treats him as her son. The German Fachkritik praised Womb for starting out as an atmospherically impressive drama, though ultimately being "philosophically and emotionally too vague" in discussing genetic engineering.

In 2012, Fliegauf shot Just the Wind, inspired by a series of murders with five victims which targeted Romani people in his country. The drama, which shows a day in the life of a Hungarian Roma family living in a climate of fear and persecution, was entered into competition at the 62nd Berlin Film Festival and received the second most important prize, the Jury Grand Prix. According to Fliegauf's own account, the structure of the film, centered on the life of a family from morning to evening, had been ready for a decade, but without an appropriate content. For the purposes of this film, he was inspired by a series of articles about the attacks on Romani people written by journalist Zoltan Tabori in 2009 and 2010 as well as a nightmare which Fliegauf used to make the final scene of the film ("I saw a hut and the ghostly shadow of a muzzle flash"). The director spent a year in research, traveling around Hungary, speaking with Romani and Sinti people. In September 2012, Just the Wind was presented as the official candidate of Hungary at the Academy Awards in the category of Best Foreign Language Film, but in the end was not shortlisted. In Germany, the film was shown in theatres up to almost eighteen months after its premiere, in its original version with German subtitles.

Fliegauf is considered a perfectionist who is known to control almost all artistic aspects of his films, including the score and the visual design. In addition to working in the film industry, Fliegauf has founded an artists' collective known as Raptor's Kollektíva.

== Filmography ==
Year	Title	Notes	Awards
1999	Border line (Határvonal)	Documentary	
2000	Talking Heads (Beszélő fejek)	Short	
2001	Is there life before death? (Van élet a halál elött?)	Documentary	
2001	Hypnosis	Short	
2002	Forest (Rengeteg)	Feature	Berlin International Film Festival - Best First Film
2003	The Line	Short	
2003	Dealer	Feature	László B. Nagy Award of the Hungarian Film Critics; Athens International Film Festival - Golden Athena; Berlin International Film Festival - Reader Jury of the "Berliner Zeitung"; Hungarian Film Week - Best Director; Mar del Plata Film Festival - Best Director; Mar del Plata Film Festival - FIPRESCI Prize
2004	Európából Európába	Documentary	
2004	A sor	Short	
2004	Pörgés	Short	
2007	Milky Way (Tejút)	Feature	Locarno International Film Festival - Golden Leopard; Hungarian Film Week - Special Prize
2008	Csillogás	Documentary	
2010	Womb	Feature	Locarno International Film Festival - Junior Jury Award; Nominated - Locarno International Film Festival - Golden Leopard
2012	Just the Wind (Csak a szél)	Feature	Berlin International Film Festival - Jury Grand Prix; Berlin International Film Festival - Amnesty International Film Prize; Berlin International Film Festival - Peace Film Award; Istanbul International Film Festival - FACE Award; Nominated; Golden Berlin Bear; LUX Prize
2016	Lily Lane (Liliom ösvény)	Feature	Lecce European Cinema Festival - Golden Olive Tree; Palic INternational Film Festival - Critics Jury Prize; Minsk International Film Festival Listapad - Golden Listapad
2021	Forest – I See You Everywhere (Rengeteg – mindenhol látlak)	Feature	
2025	Jimmy Jaguár	Feature	It competed for Crystal Globe at the KVIFF.

== Other works ==
Benedek Fliegauf was one of the founding members and later manager of the Hungarian punk rock band C.A.F.B. He later worked as contributor for "Pesti musor" a Budapest-based weekly program magazine in the mid-1990s.
