= Dénes Nagy =

Hungarian film director, editor and screenwriter

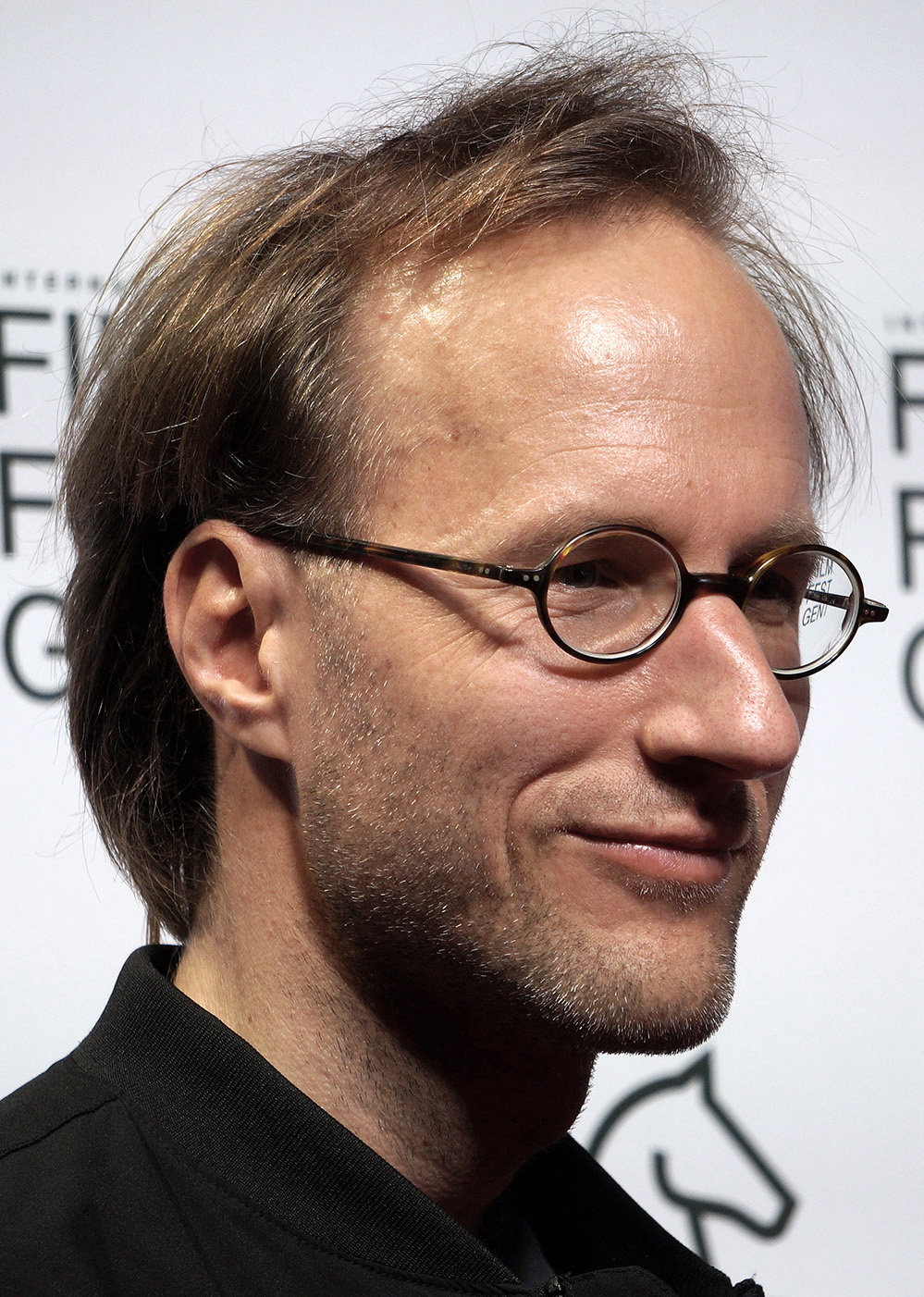
- Dénes Nagy in 2021
- Born: 1980 (age 45–46); Budapest
- Occupations: film director; screenwriter; film editor
- Years active: 2004–
- Notable work: Natural Light

Dénes Nagy (Budapest, 1980) is a Hungarian film director, editor and screenwriter. His first feature film, Natural Light was awarded the Silver Bear for Best Director in 2021.

== Life and career ==
He graduated from the University of Theatre and Film Arts in Budapest in film directing in 2009. He attended the Deutsche Film- und Fernsehakademie Berlin for one year. Several of his short films were shown in international festivals; his 2006 short Kovács Éva was invited to the Tampere Film Festival, Russian Playground was featured at Cannes Critics' Week in 2009, the short film Együtt received the Hungarian Film Critics' Award for best short film and won the award for best short film director at the 38th Hungarian Film Week (Magyar Filmszemle). His work titled Lágy eső won the Fiction Grand Prize award at the Portuguese Curtas Vila do Conde film festival in 2013.

== Films ==
- 2004 – 2003 November (short film)
- 2006 – Együtt (short film)
- 2006 – Vakáció (short film) (assistant to the director)
- 2008 – Russian Playground (short documentary)
- 2009 – Cinetrain: Where Does Europe End? (documentary)
- 2009 – Berlinskaya Fuga (short film)
- 2010 – Riport (short film)
- 2013 – Lágy eső (short film)
- 2013 – Másik Magyarország (documentary)
- 2015 – Seb (documentary)
- 2021 – Natural Light (Természetes fény) (feature film)
