= List of Serbian actors =

This is a list of notable Serbian actors and actors of Serbian descent:

== A ==
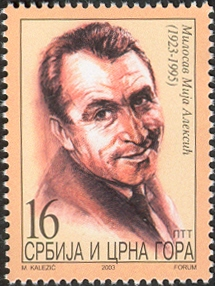
Mija Aleksić

- Milka Grgurova-Aleksić
- Mija Aleksić
- Sasha Alexander
- Slobodan Aligrudić
- Stole Aranđelović
- Neda Arnerić
- Tihomir Arsić
- Michel Auclair
- Coco Austin

== B ==
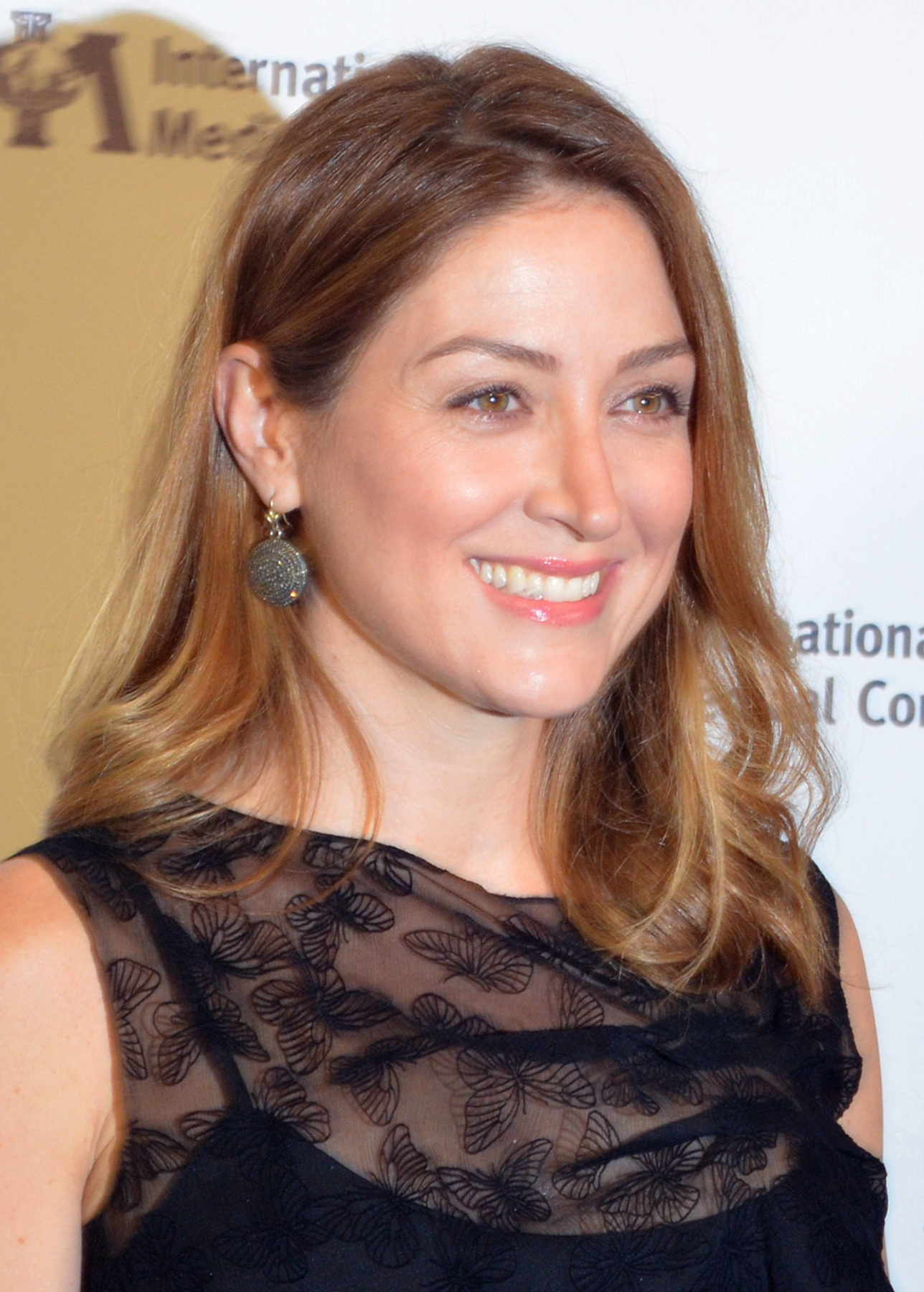
Sasha Alexander

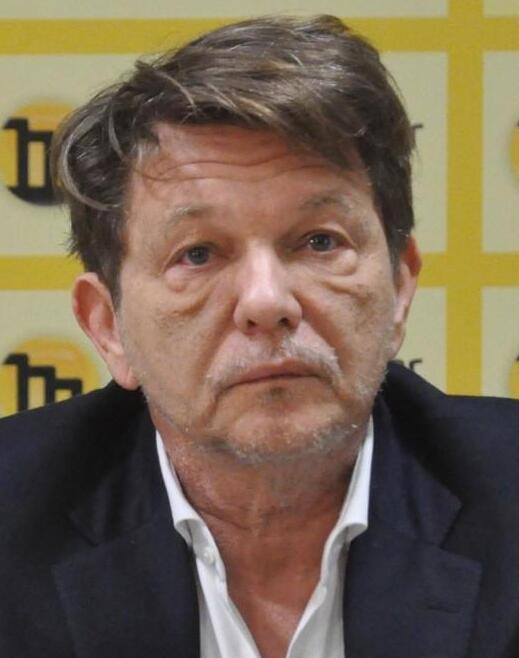
Dragan Bjelogrlić

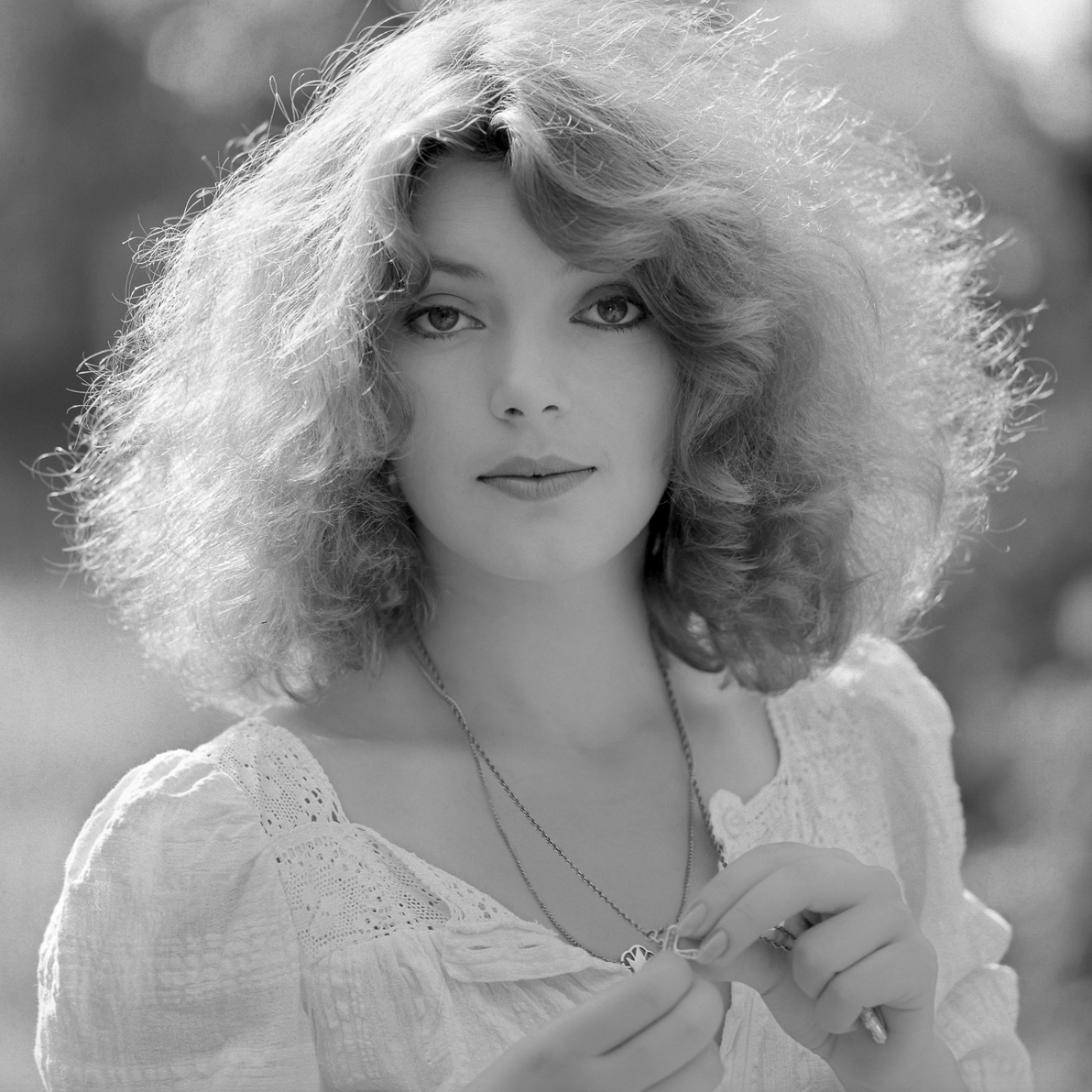
Tanja Bošković

- Aleksa Bačvanski
- Radoš Bajić
- Ljubomir Bandović
- Petar Banićević
- Mira Banjac
- María Baxa
- Zoran Bečić
- Aleksandar Berček
- Severin Bijelić
- Miloš Biković
- Predrag Bjelac
- Dragan Bjelogrlić
- Ljiljana Blagojević
- Ljubinka Bobić
- Dragomir Bojanić
- Svetlana Bojković
- Ivan Bosiljčić
- Tanja Bošković
- Petar Božović
- Vojislav Brajović
- Branimir Brstina

== C ==
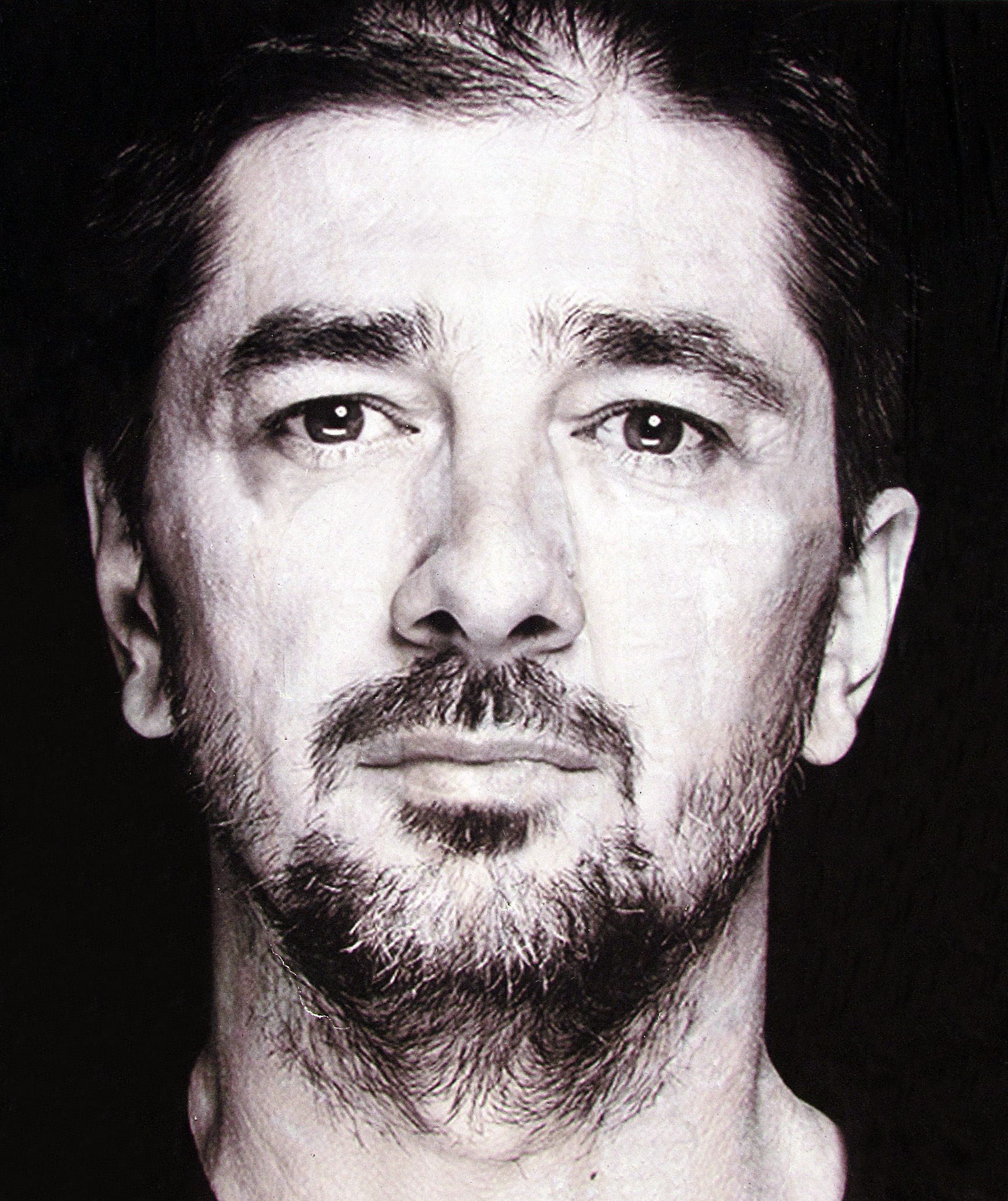
Vojin Ćetković

- Miloš Cvetić
- Branko Cvejić
- Zoran Cvijanović
- Svetozar Cvetković

== Č ==
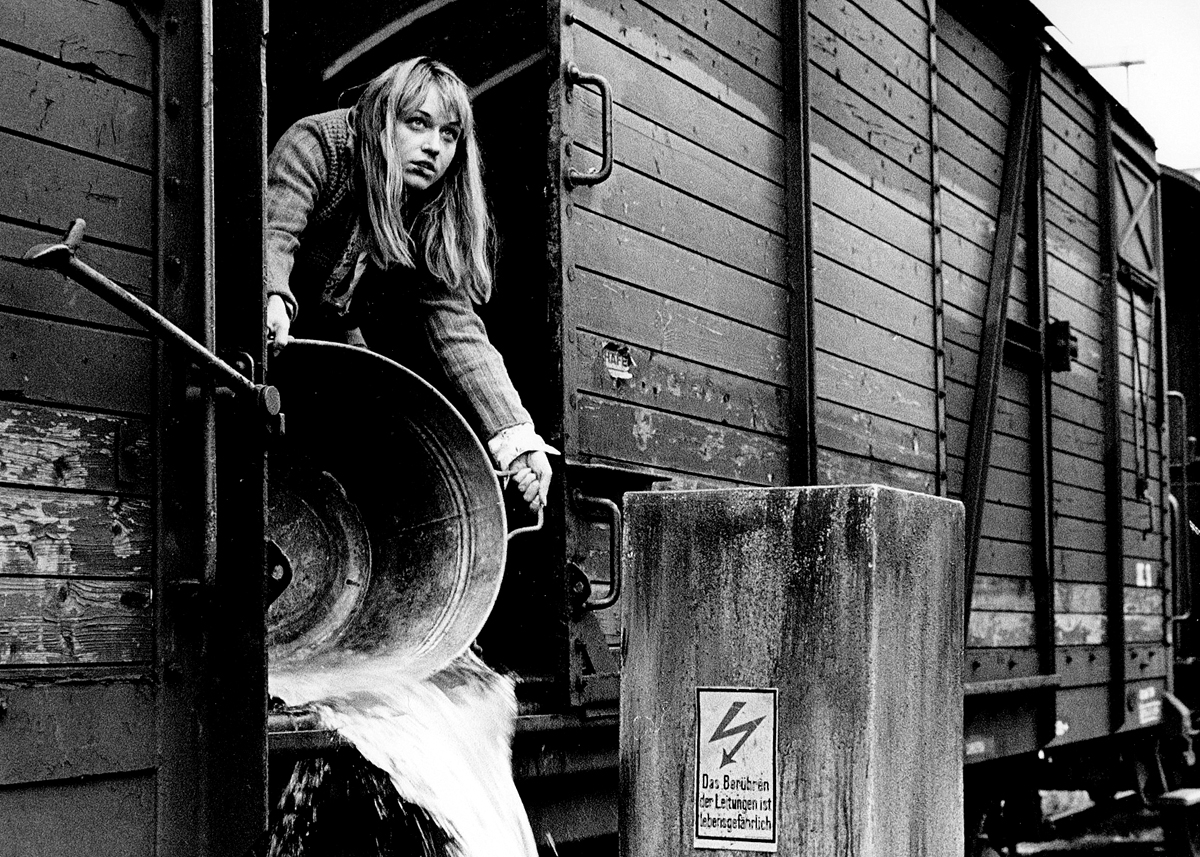
Anica Dobra

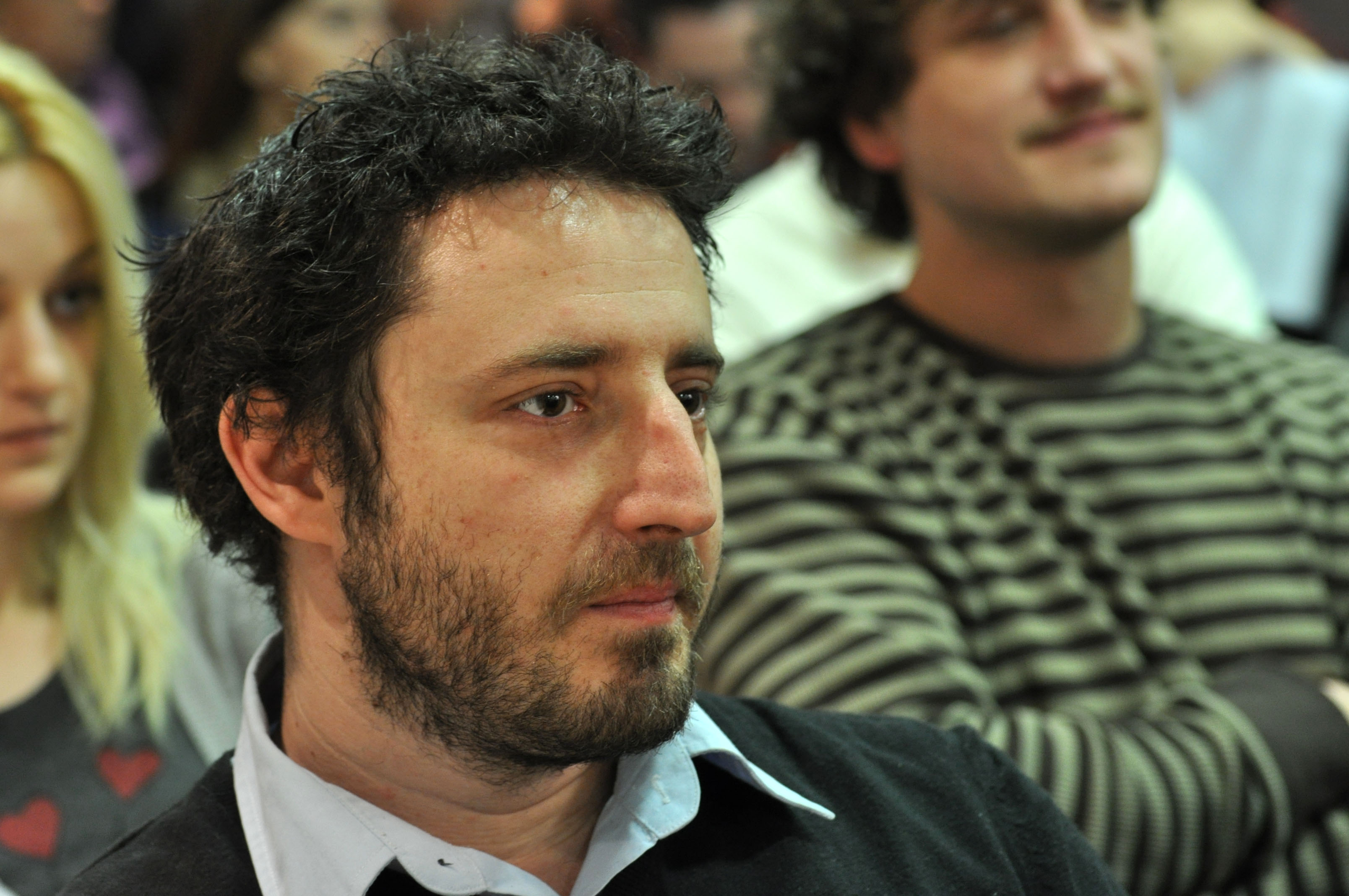
Nikola Đuričko

- Vesna Čipčić
- Dragomir Čumić
- Vera Čukić
- Pavle Čemerikić

== Ć ==
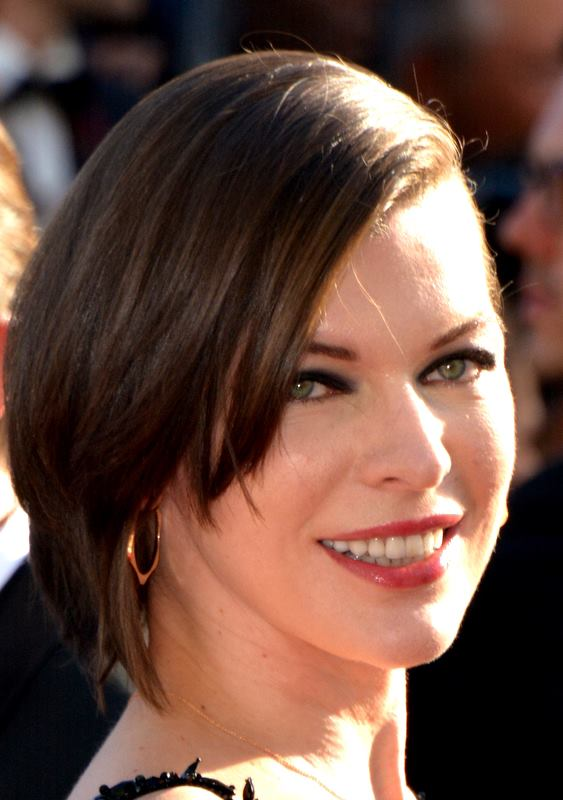
Milla Jovovich

- Vojin Ćetković
- Ljubomir Ćipranić

== D ==
- Pera Dobrinović
- Lolita Davidovich
- Brad Dexter
- Bogdan Diklić
- Divine
- Anica Dobra
- Mike Dopud
- Tamara Dragičević
- Milena Dravić
- Radivoje Dinulovic

== Đ ==
- Jasna Đuričić
- Uroš Đurić
- Nikola Đuričko
- Tomanija Đuričko

== E ==
- Predrag Ejdus
- Vanja Ejdus

== F ==
- Rahela Ferari
- Dragomir Felba
- Aleksandar Filimonović

== G ==
- Mirjana Gardinovački
- Nebojša Glogovac
- Svetislav Goncić
- Milena Govich
- Angela Gregovic
- Milan Gutović

== I ==
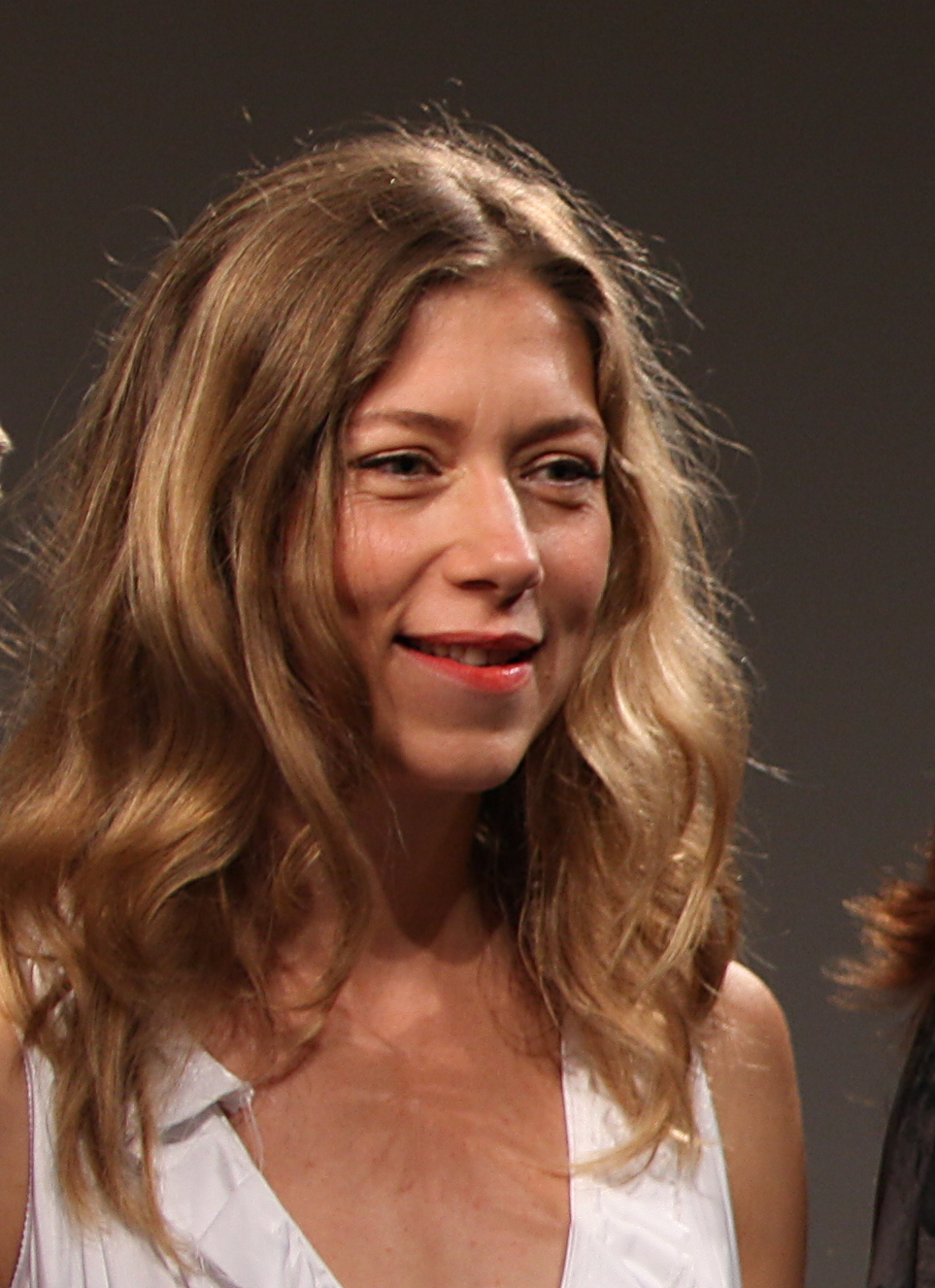
Branka Katić

- Branislava Ilić
- Boris Isaković

== J ==
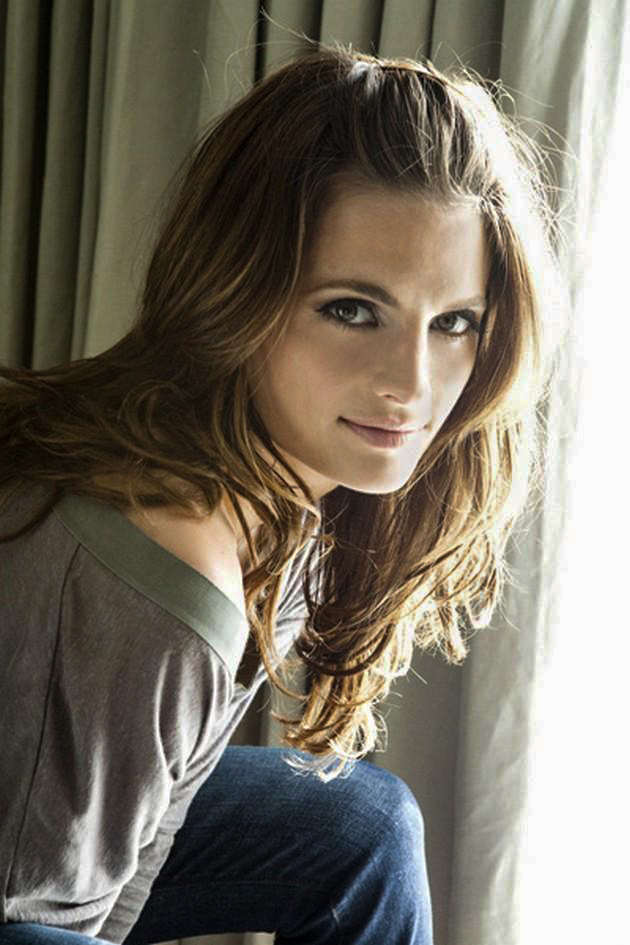
Stana Katic

- Toša Jovanović
- Adrienne Janic
- Dušan Janićijević
- Danina Jeftić
- Nenad Jezdić
- Mirjana Joković
- Dragan Jovanović
- Dubravko Jovanović
- Ljiljana Jovanović
- Toša Jovanović
- Milla Jovovich
- Maria Jelenska

== K ==
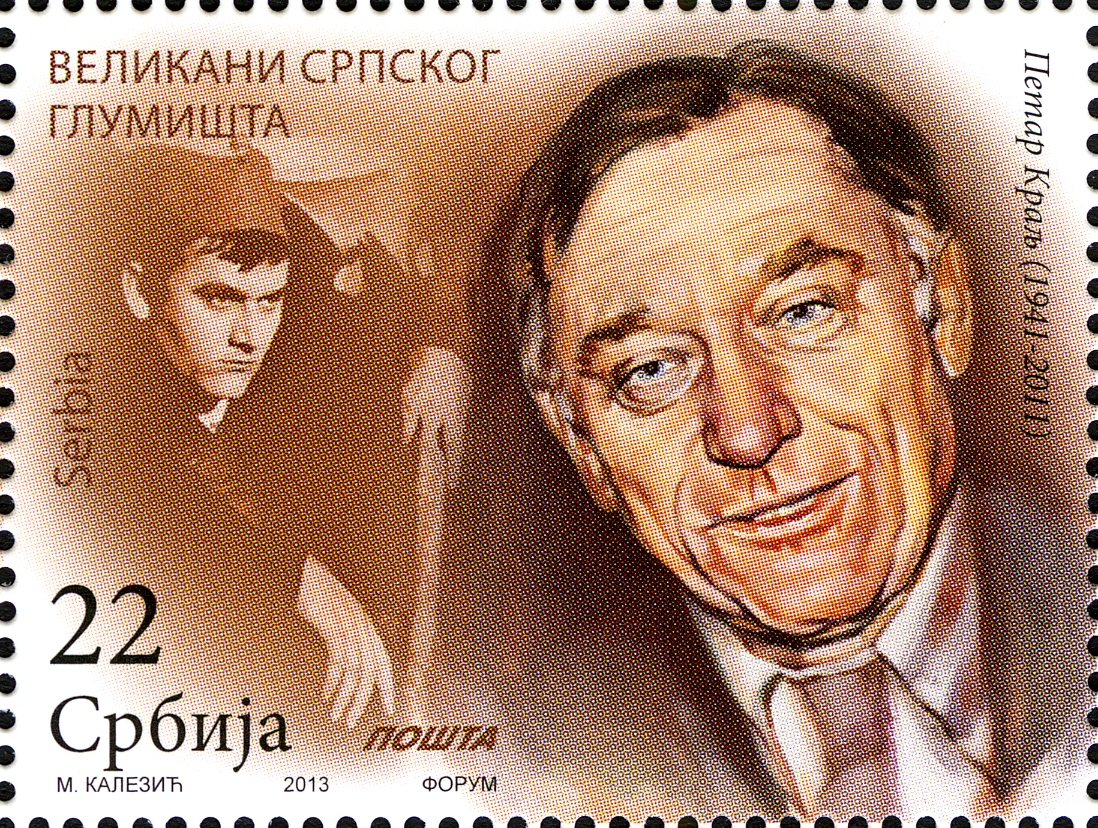
Petar Kralj

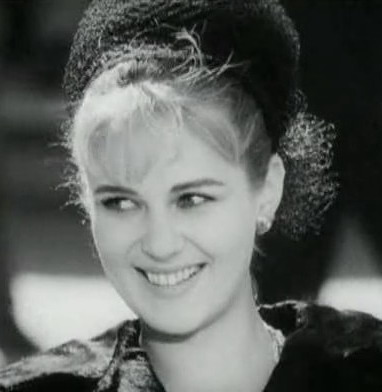
Beba Lončar

- Bata Kameni
- Branka Katić
- Stana Katić
- Stefan Kapičić
- Marija Karan
- Mirjana Karanović
- Mima Karadžić
- Gordan Kičić
- Nikola Kojo
- Uglješa Kojadinović
- Sonja Kolačarić
- Boris Komnenić
- Vuk Kostić
- Petar Kralj
- Ljiljana Krstić
- Miodrag Krivokapić

== L ==
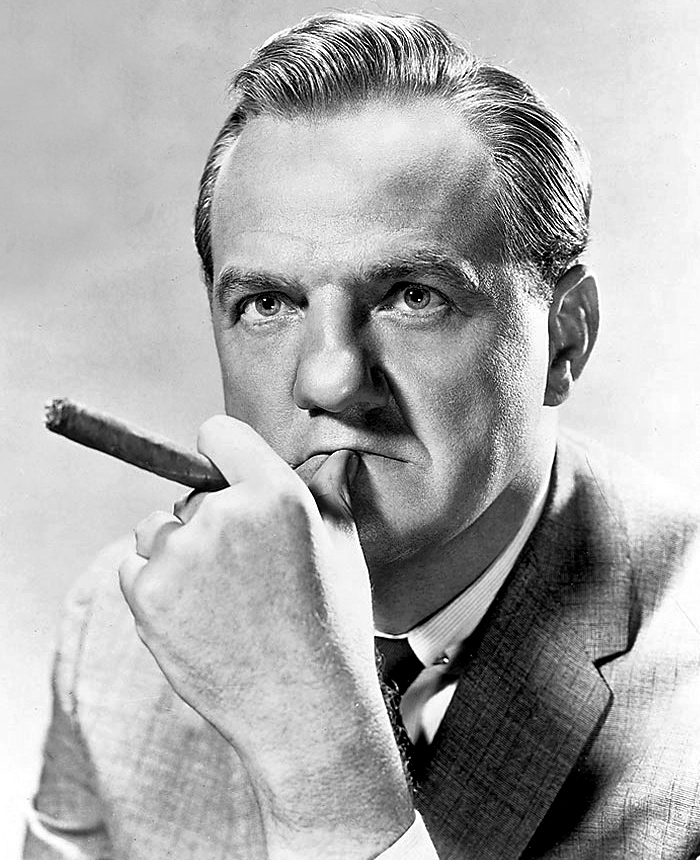
Karl Malden

- Slavko Labović
- Predrag Laković
- Žarko Laušević
- Danilo Lazović
- Branislav Lečić
- Miroljub Lešo
- Dragoljub Ljubičić
- Beba Lončar

== M ==
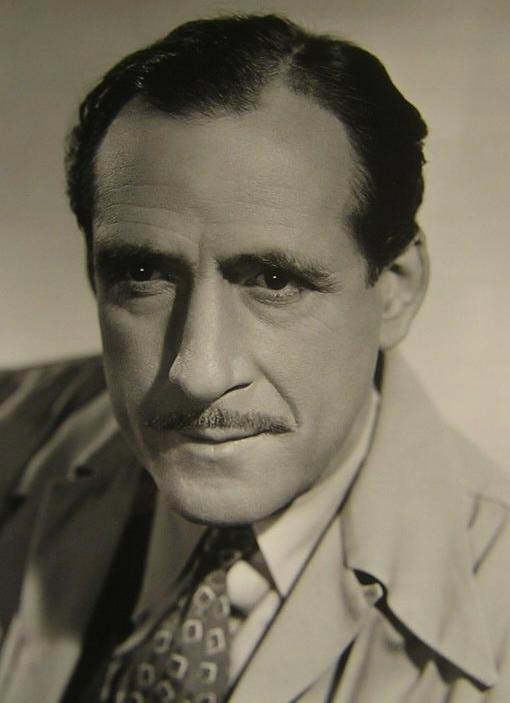
John Miljan

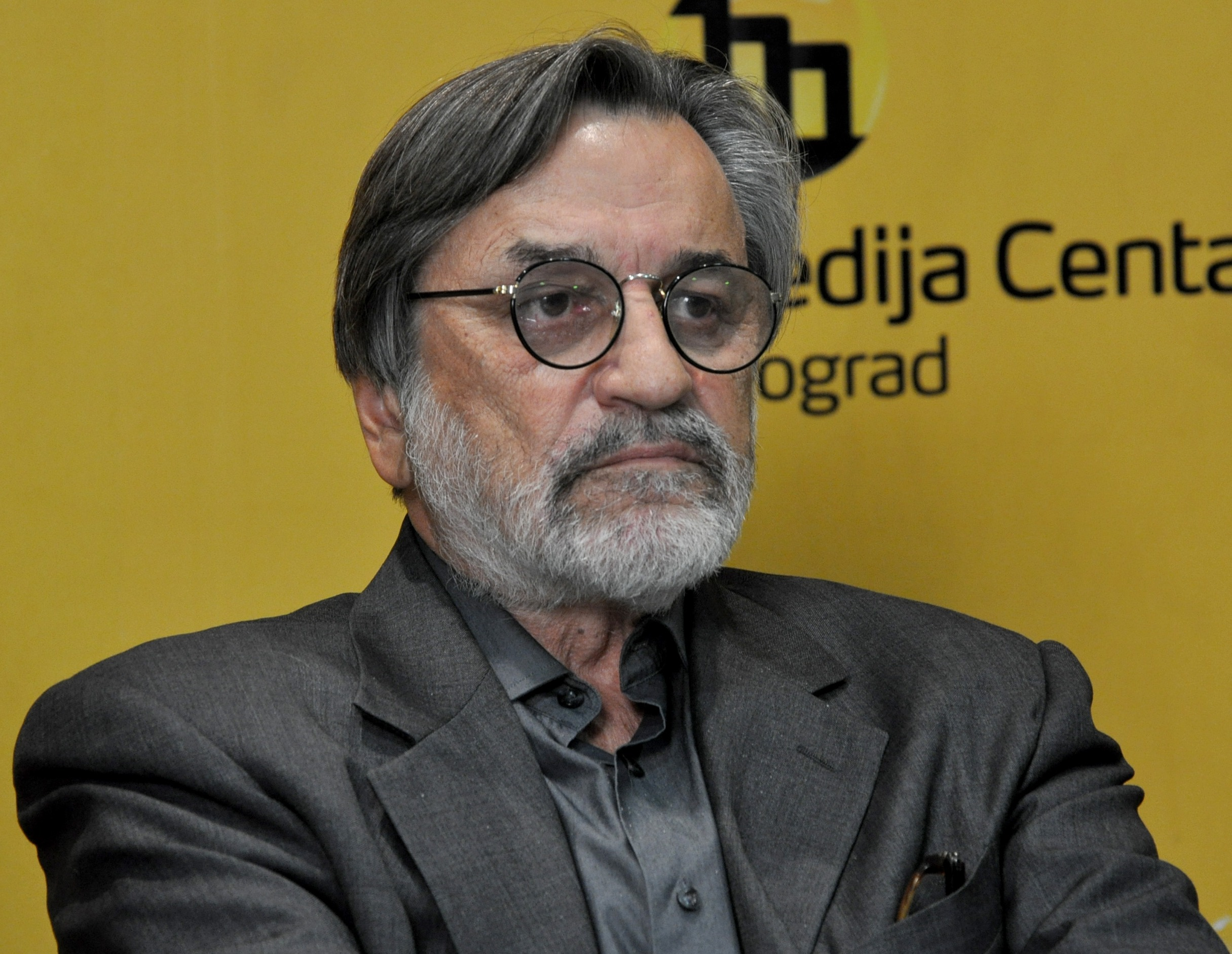
Dragan Nikolić

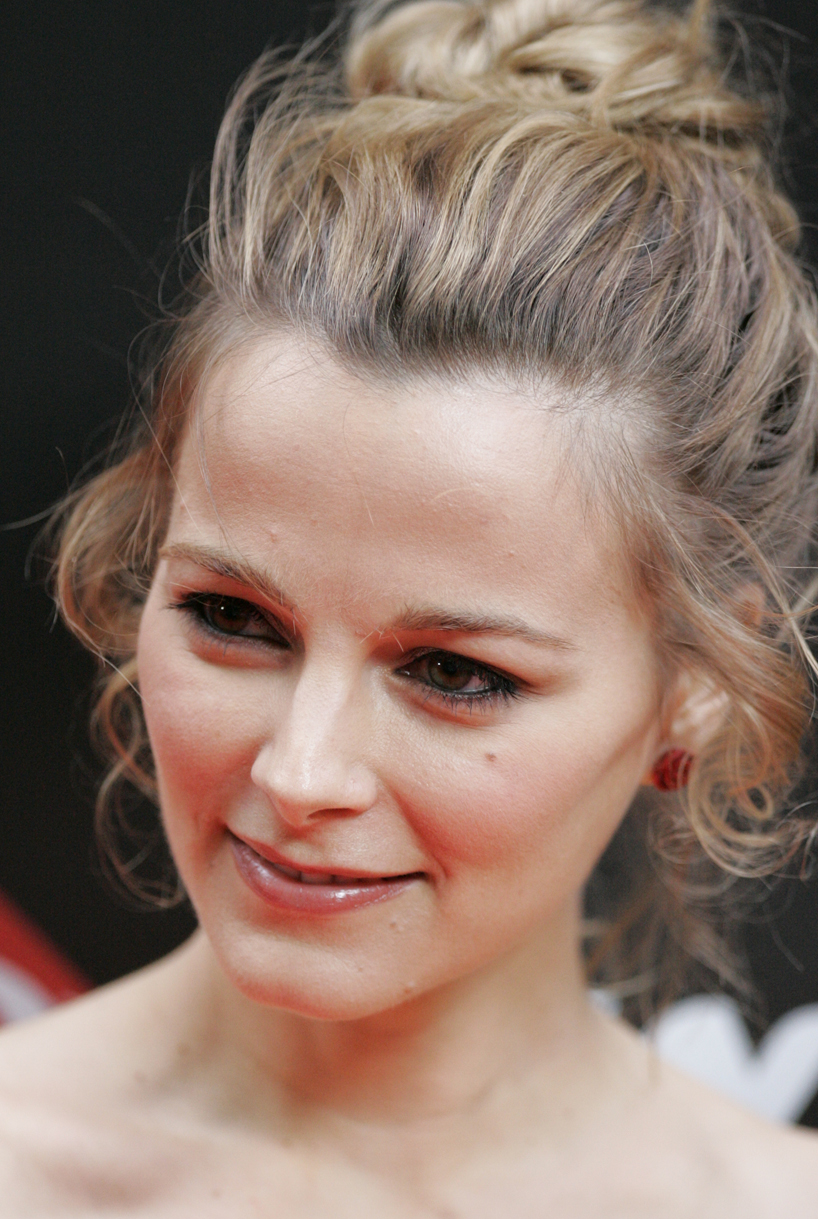
Bojana Novakovic

- Marinko Madžgalj
- Dragan Maksimović
- Karl Malden
- Milorad Mandić
- Suzana Mančić
- Maja Mandžuka
- Miki Manojlović
- Dragan Marinković
- Margaret Markov
- Olivera Marković
- Rade Marković
- Irfan Mensur
- Sloboda Mićalović
- Dragan Mićanović
- Dubravka Mijatović
- Radoslav Milenković
- Živojin Milenković
- Predrag Miletić
- Branko Milićević
- Predrag Milinković
- Boris Milivojević
- Milos Milos
- Vladislava Milosavljević
- Andrija Milošević
- Dobrica Milutinović
- Voja Mirić
- Gojko Mitić
- Vjera Mujović

== N ==
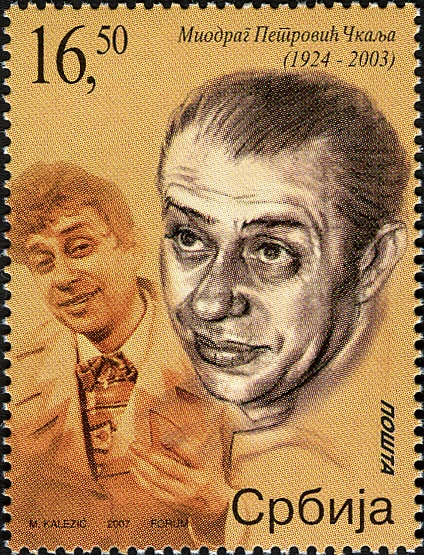
Čkalja

- Taško Načić
- Alex Nesic
- Dragan Nikolić
- Filip Nikolic
- Marko Nikolić
- Snežana Nikšić
- Nataša Ninković
- Slobodan Ninković
- Natalia Nogulich
- Bojana Novakovic
- Vela Nigrin

== O ==
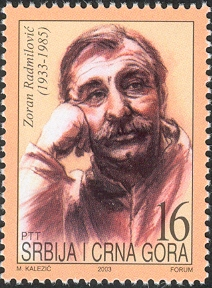
Zoran Radmilović

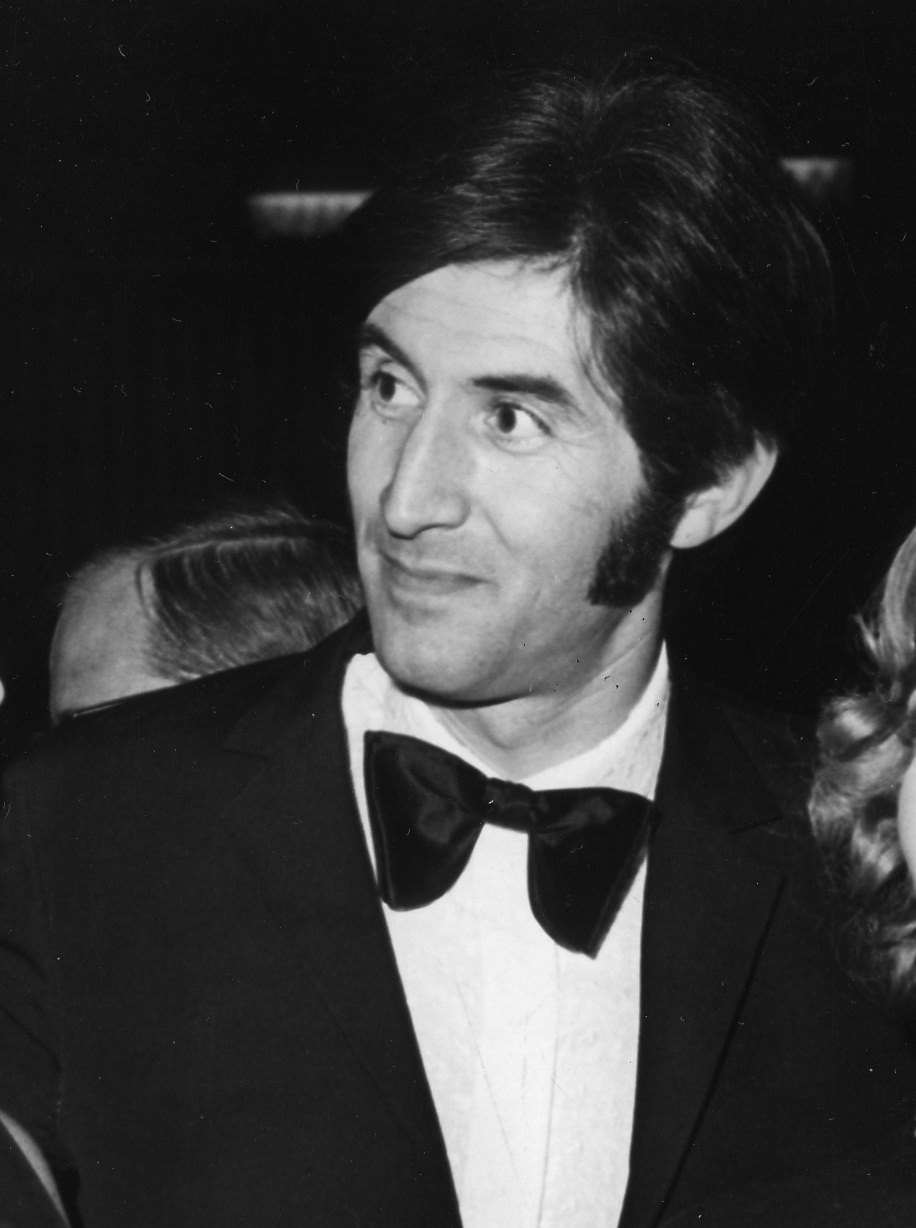
Ljubiša Samardžić

- Olga Odanović
- Bojana Ordinačev
- Ljubica Otašević
- Catherine Oxenberg

== P ==
- Bata Paskaljević
- Nikola Pejaković
- Ljuma Penov
- Zlata Petković
- Suzana Petričević
- Iván Petrovich
- Miodrag Petrović Čkalja
- Natasha Petrovic
- Branko Pleša
- Gorica Popović
- Branka Pujić
- Milorad Petrović

== R ==
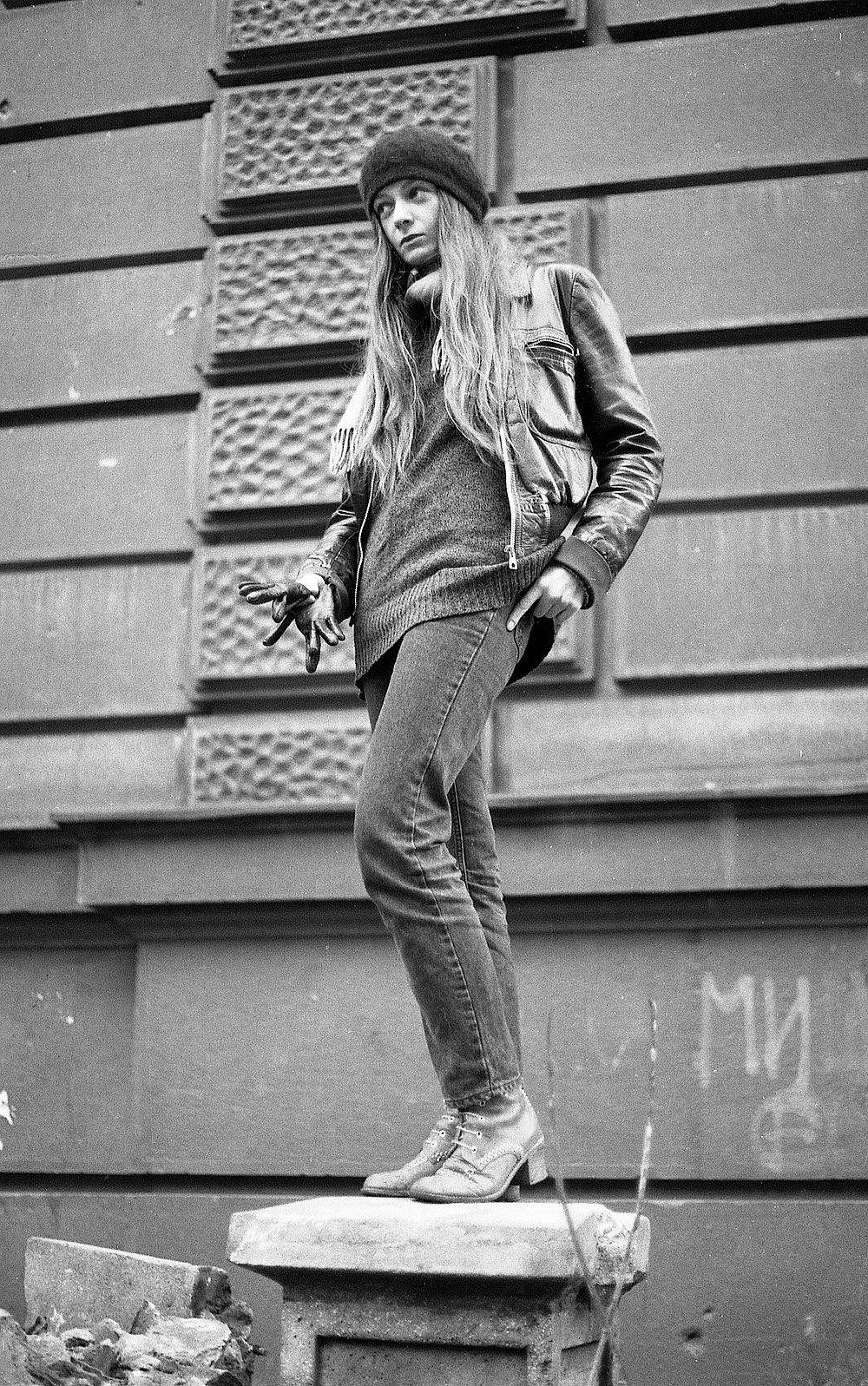
Sonja Savić

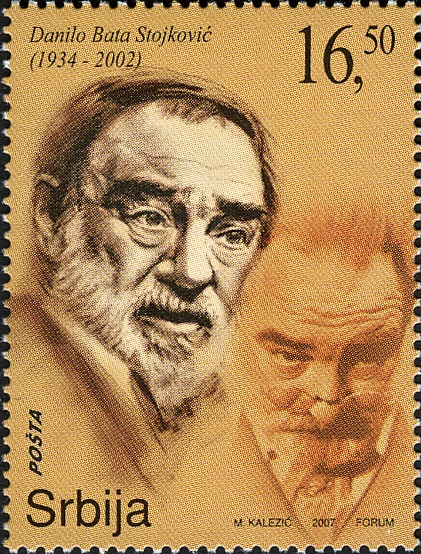
Danilo Stojković

- Goran Radaković
- Aleksandar Radenkovic
- Katarina Radivojević
- Zoran Radmilović
- Zoran Rankić
- Eva Ras
- Ivan Rassimov
- Rada Rassimov
- Nadja Regin
- Ljubomir Ristić
- Lazar Ristovski
- Đoko Rosić
- Draginja Ružić

== S ==
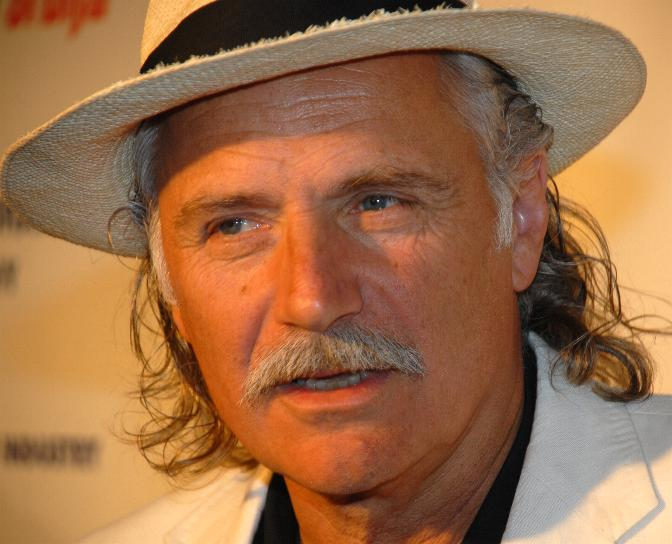
Rade Šerbedžija

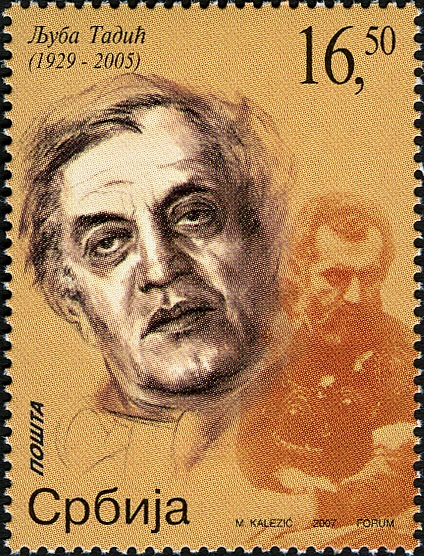
Ljuba Tadić

- Seka Sablić
- Ljubiša Samardžić
- Sonja Savić
- Radmila Savićević
- Nikola Simić
- Ana Sofrenović
- Ružica Sokić
- Neda Spasojević
- Olga Spiridonović
- Ilija Stanojević (1859–1930)
- Jelica Sretenović
- Tihomir Stanić
- Boro Stjepanović
- Vlastimir Đuza Stojiljković
- Stoya
- Petar Strugar
- Danilo Stojković
- Žanka Stokić
- Mira Stupica

== Š ==
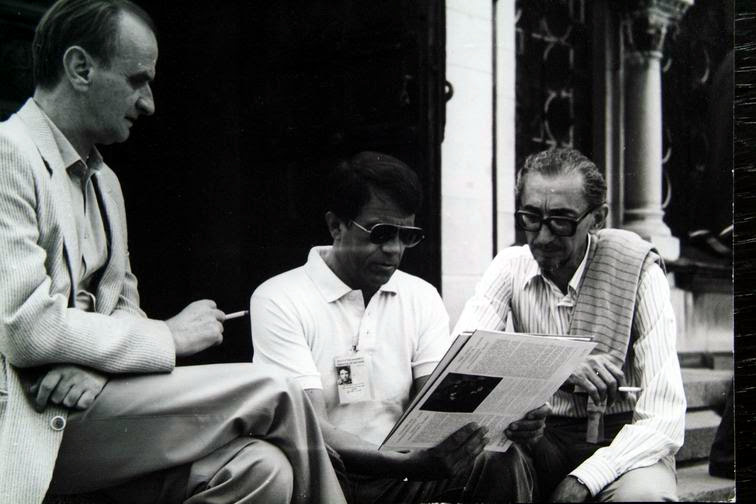
Bora Todorović in the middle

- Stevan Šalajić
- Nataša Šolak
- Slavko Štimac

== T ==
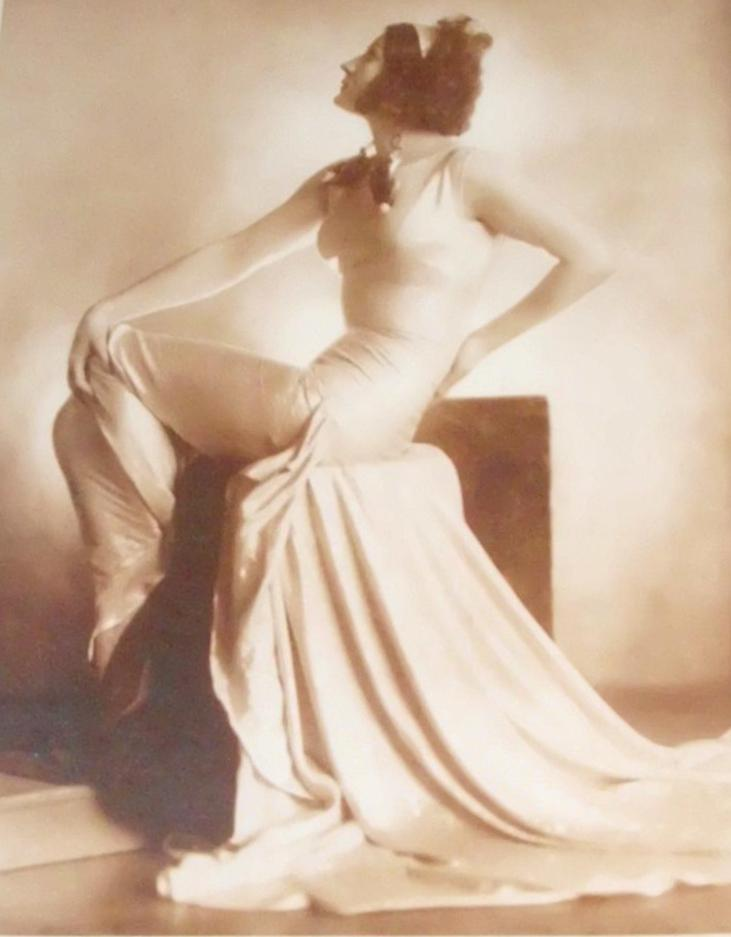
Nevenka Urbanova

- Ljuba Tadić
- Predrag Tasovac
- Josif Tatić
- Miloš Timotijević
- Jelena Tinska
- Zelda Tinska
- Bora Todorović
- Marko Todorović
- Srđan Todorović
- Milivoje Tomić
- Branko Tomović
- Branislav Trifunović
- Sergej Trifunović
- Vesna Trivalić
- Lazar Telecki

== U ==
- Renata Ulmanski
- Nevenka Urbanova

== V ==
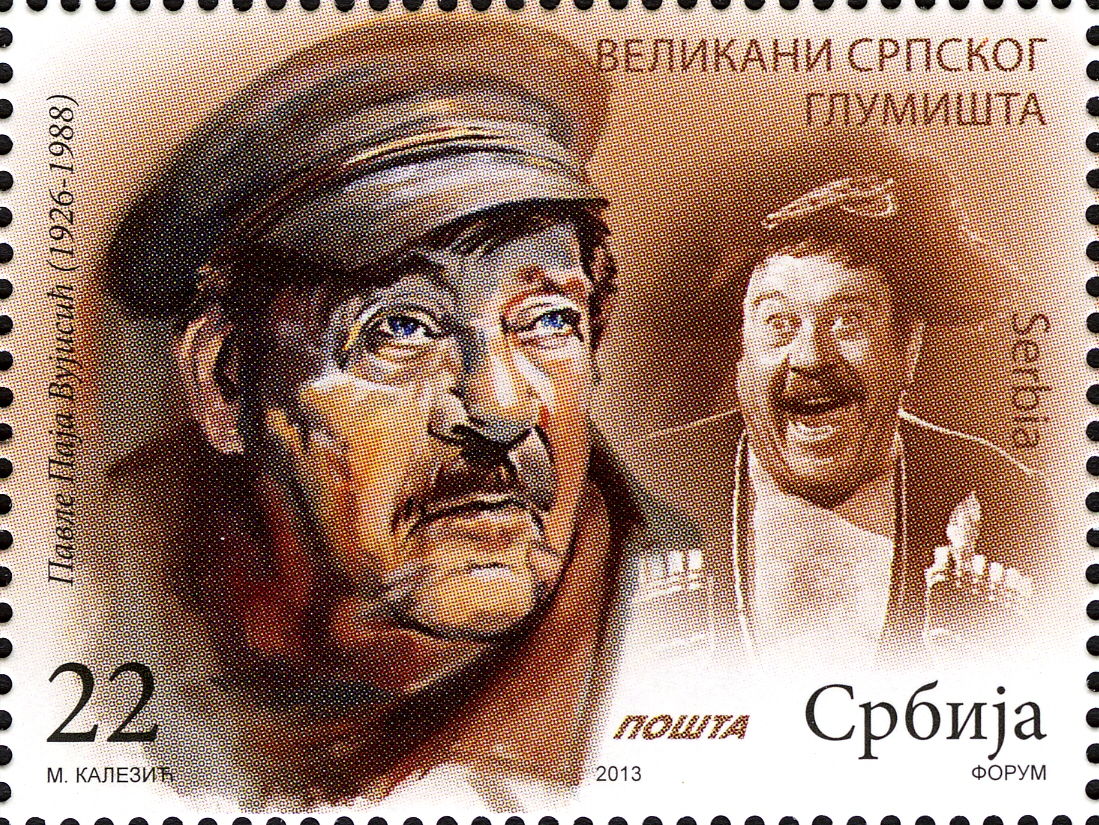
Pavle Vuisić

- Branka Veselinović
- Holly Valance
- Mirka Vasiljević
- Mlađa Veselinović
- Andrijana Videnović
- Gala Videnović
- Steve Vinovich
- John Vivyan
- Janez Vrhovec
- Olivera Vučo
- Pavle Vuisić

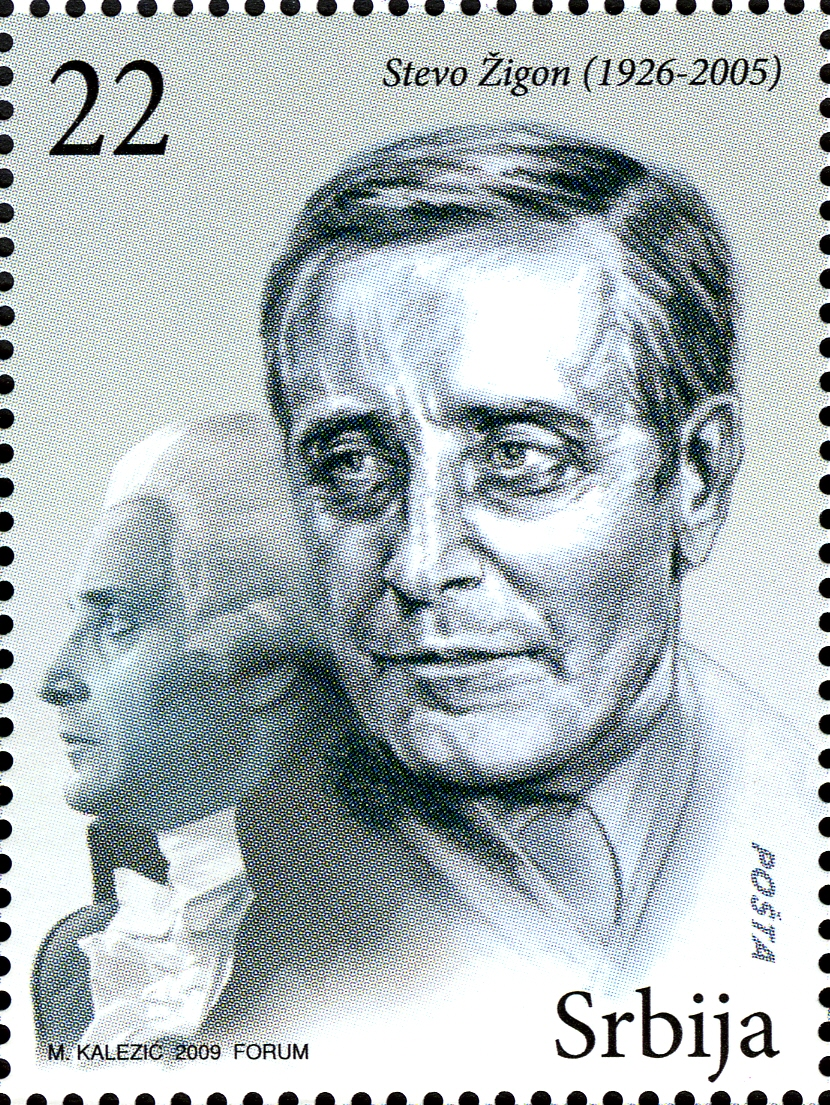
Stevo Žigon

- Lidija Vukićević

== Y ==
- Ursula Yovich

== Z ==
- Milenko Zablaćanski
- Geraldine Zivic

== Ž ==
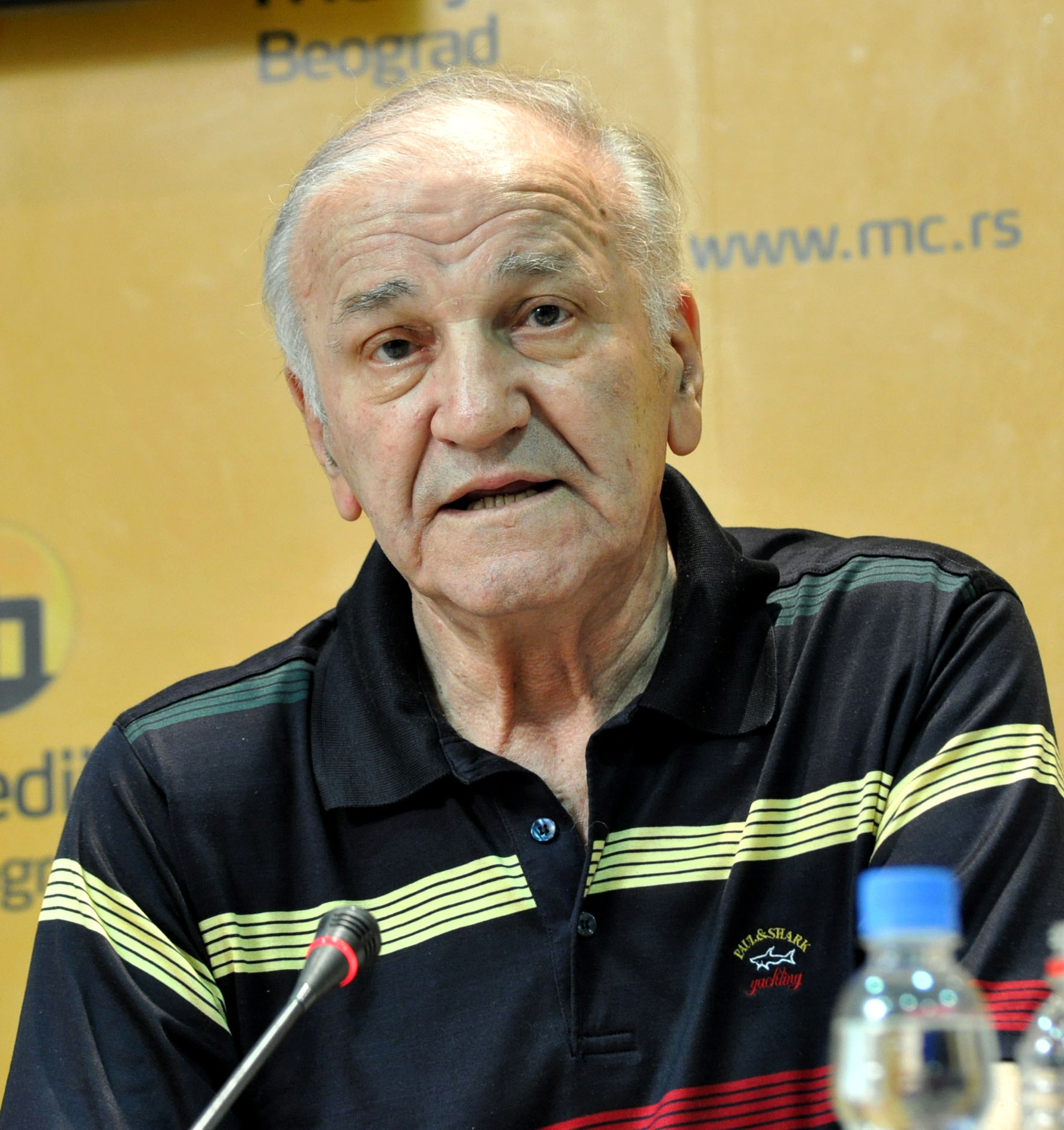
Bata Živojinović

- Dušica Žegarac
- Stevo Žigon
- Milivoje Živanović
- Radmila Živković
- Vladan Živković
- Bata Živojinović
- Miloš Žutić
- Katarina Žutić

== See also ==
- Žanka Stokić award
- List of people from Serbia
- Lists of actors
