= Stevan Vladislav Kaćanski =

Serbian poet and publicist (1829–1890)

Stevan Vladislav Kaćanski Стеван Владислав Каћански
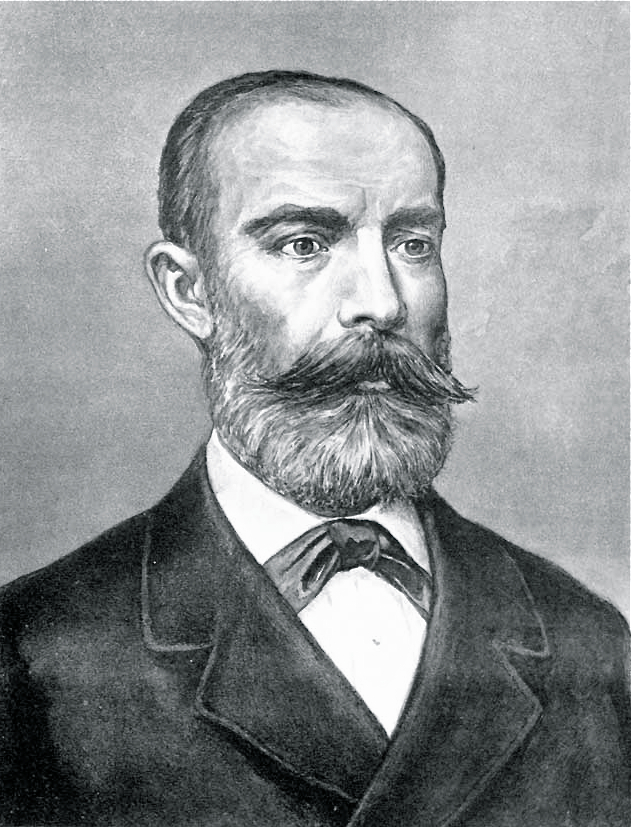
- Born: 5 January 1829; Srbobran, Bačka, Austrian Empire
- Died: 4 May 1890 (aged 61); Belgrade, Kingdom of Serbia
- Other name: Stari bard
- Occupations: Poet, publicist, teacher
- Writing career
- Period: 1846–1890
- Movement: Romanticism

Stevan Vladislav Kaćanski - "Stari Bard" (Serbian Cyrillic: Стеван Владислав Каћански; 5 January 1829 – 4 May 1890) was a Serbian poet and publicist. Most of his poems were inspired by Serbian liberation and unification. These included Noćnica, on the capture of Temerin during the Serbian Revolution of 1848–1849, Grahov laz on the 1858 Battle of Grahovac, and Narodni zbor which he wrote in response to the 1875 Herzegovina uprising.

== Biography ==
=== Early life and the Revolution of 1848–1849 ===
Stevan Vladislav Kaćanski was born in Srbobran, in Bačka. Although late December 1828 was often given as his birth date, he was probably born on 5 January 1829. His parents were Trifun and Julijana (née Vojinović), and he had a sister named Evica. He came from a prosperous merchant family whose last name derived from the village of Kać, from which the family had moved to Srbobran in the late 18th or early 19th century. The family was originally from Herzegovina, where their last name was Vladisavljević. Because of this, Kaćanski used "Vladislav" before his last name. His paternal grandfather Gavrilo (1787–1847) was a wealthy livestock merchant, while his uncle Sergije Kaćanski (born Simeun) became bishop of the Eparchy of Gornji Karlovac and participated in the May Assembly of 1848.

Kaćanski began primary school in Srbobran and later attended a German-language school in Petrovaradin. He attended the gymnasium in Sremski Karlovci, where he published his first poem, Usklik mladih Srba, in Podunavka on 15 February 1846. The poem reflected the influence of the youth movement associated with Ľudovít Štúr in Pressburg and Modra, to which Svetozar Miletić also belonged. Kaćanski subsequently continued his studies in Szeged. There, he served as secretary of the Society of Serbian Students, whose president was Laza Marković.

Kaćanski continued his philosophical studies in Eger. During the Serb uprising of 1848–1849, he participated as a publicist and poet. He also served in a militia company defending Srbobran under the command of Novak Golubski. During the uprising, while traveling by steamboat between Sremski Karlovci and Titel, Kaćanski accidentally shot his friend Laza Marković, who subsequently died from his wound. The incident left Kaćanski deeply distressed. His poem Noćnica, about the 1848 capture of Temerin, was reportedly widely read among Serbian insurgent soldiers in camp. It was first published in Sedmica in 1855.

After the revolution, Kaćanski completed his law studies in Zagreb in 1850. He lived in Srbobran from 1850 to late 1857, avoiding public life. He also spent time in Novi Sad during this period.

=== Poetry, journalism, and political activism ===
In December 1857, Kaćanski moved to Belgrade, where he taught world history and Serbian history at the gymnasium on a contractual basis. At the time, he was not yet a citizen of the Principality of Serbia. While in Belgrade, he became friends with poet Đura Jakšić. In June 1859, Kaćanski applied for Serbian citizenship for himself and his family, but the Ministry of Education advised against an immediate decision. That September, he was transferred to the Savamala lower gymnasium, where he taught Latin and German. In 1860, Kaćanski responded to Jakšić's poem Ćutite, ćut'te with Neka ih, neka, published in Danica. Both poems reflected the poets' dissatisfaction with the treatment of Serbs from the Habsburg lands in Serbia.

After the abolition of the Voivodeship of Serbia and Banat of Temeschwar in 1860, Kaćanski responded with the poem Haj!. The poem was published in the Novi Sad literary magazine Danica in 1861 and was set to music by Aksentije Maksimović, then a student at the Karlovci gymnasium, who was expelled from school for the composition. The same year, Kaćanski published his poem Oj oblaci in Letopis Matice Srpske, later also set to music by Mita Topalović.

In October 1861, Kaćanski resigned from his teaching position. He later explained that he had resigned to establish a political newspaper, believing he could better serve the Serbian national cause through journalism. He finally became a citizen of the Principality of Serbia on 1 June 1862. A week later, he started the newspaper Srbska narodnost. During the fighting surrounding the Ottoman bombardment of Belgrade in June 1862, Kaćanski gathered a group of volunteers and participated in an attack on Ottoman positions at Varoš Gate. With the support of the Serbian authorities, the group was subsequently organized as the Prizren Legion, with Kaćanski serving as its commander. The Legion was a volunteer military formation intended, in the event of war with the Ottoman Empire, to enter "Old Serbia" and advance toward Prizren. It numbered between 60 and 120 men and was incorporated into the defense of Belgrade and maintained by the Serbian Ministry of War. The Legion was ultimately disbanded in October 1862 as part of Serbia's obligations toward the Great Powers with the remaining members each receiving a severance pay.

In 1862, Kaćanski published a version of his poem Grahov laz in Javor. The poem was dedicated to the poet Jovan Jovanović Zmaj, Kaćanski's blood brother (pobratim), in response to an earlier poem in which Zmaj had reproached him for his long absence from poetry. Grahov laz depicted the 1858 Battle of Grahovac. Laza Kostić later supplied his own ending in Danica in 1864. Kaćanski himself later completed the poem and published the finished version as part of his collected poetry in 1879.

In 1864, Kaćanski moved from Belgrade to Kragujevac. On 29 July that year, he was appointed an honorary member of the Serbian Learned Society. He taught Latin at the Kragujevac Gymnasium. Kaćanski also headed the Kragujevac theater and served as president of the youth society Šumadija. In 1867, he wrote to Jovan Đorđević, director of the Serbian National Theatre, requesting several newer plays including Zmaj's one-act Šaran for the theater's repertoire. Kaćanski intended to replace works by Joakim Vujić, which he called "runts and monstrosities". As theater head and Šumadija president, Kaćanski campaigned for the construction of a theater building in Kragujevac. In 1866, he also planned to establish a political newspaper. During his years in Kragujevac, Kaćanski remained close to Đura Jakšić, who was then teaching in nearby Sabanta. Kaćanski returned to Belgrade in 1870.

In 1871, Kaćanski made his first visit to Montenegro, where he attended festivities marking the birth of Prince Danilo, the heir apparent. He also contributed to the Cetinje literary periodical Crnogorka, including the poem Crna Gora... and the travelogue Sa ravnoga mora u vrletnu Crnu Goru. During his stay, Prince Nikola presented Kaćanski with a silver yatagan for his poem Grahov laz.

In 1873, Kaćanski founded his first political journal, the triweekly Branik, together with journalist Milan Đorđević. Kaćanski wrote most of its leading articles. Most of its political articles were written by Đorđević in support of Svetozar Miletić's Serbian National Freethinkers' Party. The journal was short-lived, appearing from 1 March to 27 April 1873. It ran for 23 issues.

In July 1875, the Herzegovina uprising began with the armed clash near Nevesinje known as the Nevesinjska puška. In response, Kaćanski published the poem Narodni zbor in Javor. The poem was also known by its opening line, Hej, trubaču s bujne Drine. In September, the Serbian government sent General Ranko Alimpić to the Bosnian frontier with secret instructions to organize volunteer companies and covertly send them across the Drina. By the fall of 1875, Kaćanski was in Belgrade gathering volunteers for the uprising. Together with Đorđe Stratimirović, he had been tasked with recruiting volunteers from Austria-Hungary. For this work, Kaćanski received 100 imperial ducats from the Serbian Ministry of Foreign Affairs. In 1876, composer Josif Marinković set Narodni zbor to music. His setting was also known as Hej, trubaču. The setting later became the official anthem of the Academic Singing Society "Obilić" in 1889.

Kaćanski served in both Serbian–Ottoman Wars. During the Second Serbian–Ottoman War of 1877–1878, he served with the rank of major, taking part in the operations around Babina Glava and Bela Palanka in December 1877. At the end of December 1877, Kaćanski was appointed to the provisional administration established in newly occupied Leskovac. Kaćanski was primarily responsible for police affairs, but he also dealt with tasks such as procuring seed grain, handling telegraph materials, and administering former Ottoman vineyards and land. He left Leskovac for Belgrade on 3 March 1878, after which he returned to teaching. By 1880, Kaćanski was teaching German and geography at the Belgrade Gymnasium.

=== Cultural societies and nationalist journalism ===
In 1883, Kaćanski helped establish the Society for Art. The idea originated in the literary gatherings at the home of poet and former justice minister Jovan Ilić, and his son Dragutin Ilić was among its founders. The society was founded at the Citizens' Casino in Belgrade, which provided the society with two rooms for its activities. Kaćanski was elected president, with Mihailo Valtrović as vice-president. The governing board included the painters Đorđe Krstić and Stevan Todorović and the composers Davorin Jenko and Josif Marinković. Others invited to join included Matija Ban, Milan Kujundžić Aberdar, Laza Lazarević, Laza Kostić and Vojislav Ilić. In 1884, Kaćanski wrote the society's anthem, Srpski oro, which Jenko set to music. Its literary periodical Preodnica, launched that year and edited by Dragutin Ilić, published poetry by Vojislav Ilić.

At the society's first public artistic gathering on 12 January 1884, Kaćanski delivered the opening address, Milka Grgurova performed a one-act comedy, Miloš Cvetić recited poems by Đura Jakšić and Kaćanski, Dragutin Ilić lectured on Branko Radičević, and Josif Marinković performed kolo music. In April 1884, the society exhibited Đorđe Krstić's painting Takovska crkva at the Citizens' Casino. The exhibition was attended by Queen Natalija Obrenović. In 1885, the society exhibited sculptures by Petar Ubavkić, including a marble bust purchased by the royal court, and Krstić's painting Smrt kneza Lazara. Queen Natalija visited both exhibitions. By 1886, the society's meetings and activities were no longer reported.

== Personal life ==
Kaćanski married Milka in 1855. She was a widow and had three daughters from her first marriage. The couple had a son together named Vladislav.

Milka died in 1876 while Kaćanski was away on military duty. He remained close to his stepchildren.

== Works ==
- Skupljene pesme (Collected Poems)
- Od Balkana do Adrije (From the Balkans to Adria)
- Grahov laz
- Narodni zbor
