= Aleksa Bačvanski =

Serbian actor and theater director

Aleksandar "Aleksa" Bačvanski (1832 — 26 March 1881) was a Serbian actor and theater director. He was an interesting personality in the history of the modern Serbian theatre with an international career but tragic personal and artistic fate. He brought realism to the art of the theatre.

== Biography ==
Born in Temesvár, Kingdom of Hungary, Austrian Empire, Aleksa Bačvanski graduated from the gymnasium in Sremski Karlovci and continued his education in Szeged in 1846.

After the defeat of the Hungarian Revolution of 1848 in which he participated as a high school student, he established an amateur theater in Szeged. After graduating from the city's Lyceum he entered the civil service in Pest and Kecskemét. His love for theater led him to quit his job and join a Hungarian touring theatre, where he developed into a character actor. He played in Pest using the theatrical name of Varhidi. In Pest, the painter Stevan Todorović hired him as a member of the National Theater in Belgrade. In addition to acting, he distinguished himself as a master of directing, which he raised to an enviable height, preparing for the work of Adam Mandrović of Dubravka fame, Miloš Cvetić, Vela Nigrin, Milka Grgurova, Pera Dobrinović, Milorad Gavrilovic, and Toša Jovanović. He was a master at directing epic scenes.

He stopped directing in 1874, suffering from eye disease after an unfortunate fall and concussion. Together with the writer and founder of the National Theater, Jovan Đorđević, he founded and managed the first modern School of Acting in 1870.

As an actor, he was representative of the character's personality and stood out with realistic suggestive play. His main roles were: Shylock (Shakespeare's The Merchant of Venice),Harpagon (Molière's The Miser), Đurađ Branković (Obernik Đurađ Branković), Louis XI (Casimir Delavigne's Louis XI) and others in which he played after a serious illness when he became blind.

He bid farewell to the Belgrade audience on 25 March 1881 in the role of Abbé Faria (Alexandre Dumas's The Count of Monte Cristo). Shortly after the play, Bačvanski died. "In the history of Serbian theater, he represents one of the most tragic figures".

Bačvanski died in Belgrade, Principality of Serbia.

== See also ==
- Arkadije Pejić
- Joakim Vujić
