= Irma Jelenska =

Croatian Actress

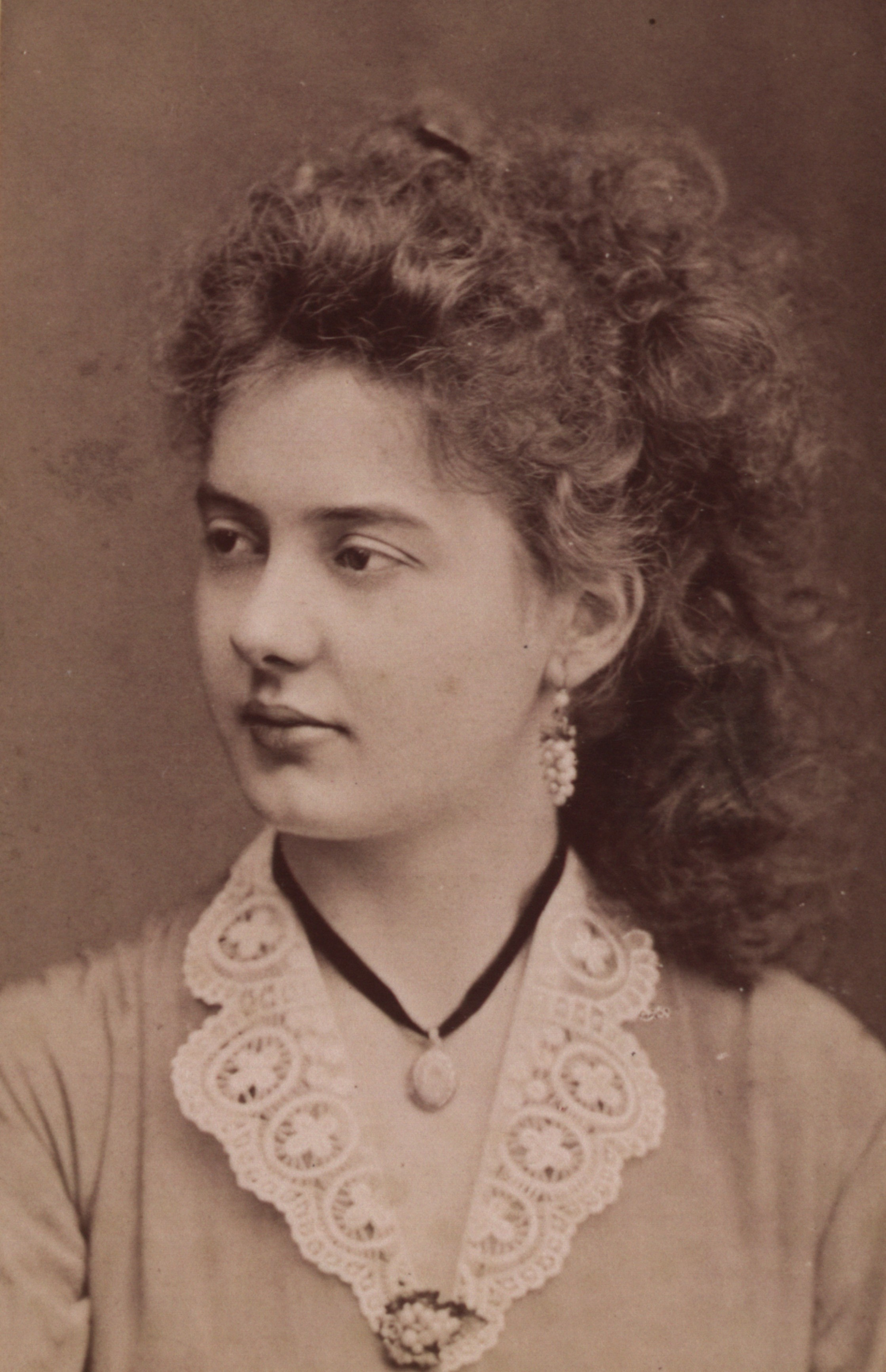
- Jelenska, c. 1870–1880
- Born: Marija Ferk; May 1852; Križevci, Austrian Empire
- Died: December 29, 1882 (aged 30); Barcelona, Spain

Irma Jelenska or Marija Jelenska (May 1852 – 29 December 1882) was a Croatian theatre actress who came to prominence in Belgrade, Serbia and had a career elsewhere in Austria-Hungary and Germany.

== Biography ==
Marija Ferk was born in Križevci, at the time in the Austrian Empire. She graduated from acting school in Vienna. In 1866 she was engaged in the Croatian National Theatre in Zagreb, and in 1868 she acted in Osijek.

While in Osijek, at the age of 27, Jelenska was invited to perform at the National Theater in Belgrade in February 1869. At the session of the theater board on 3 March, her letter was read, stating that she would accept guest appearances in six plays. The board determined five imperial ducats for each performance and six ducats in the name of travel expenses. She became a member in 1869. Jelenska first appeared in front of the Belgrade theatre audience on 12 April in a short Schneider play "Colonel of 18"; she played the main role (Marquis Julia Kreki) and then performed: on 23 April in Subotić's "Praise" in the main role, the daughter of the prefect of Raška; 4 May Macu in "Border Guards" by Freidenreich; 6 May in Schiller's "Intrigue and Love"; 8 May in "Heroes" by Mersan; 10, 11, and 14 May in Schiller's "Mary Stewart." That piece ended the season.

The grand opening of the National Theater on October 30, 1869 featured the play "The Posthumous Glory of Prince Mihailo" by Đorđe Maletić, with performances from Adam Mandrović, Đorđe Peleš, Miloš Cvetić, Toša Jovanović, Milka Grgurova, Marija Jelenska, Julka Jovanović, and others.

In its second season and the first in the newly built theatre on the site of the former Stambol Gate, the National Theatre staged Shakespeare’s The Merchant of Venice on 26 November 1869, marking the first performance of a Shakespeare play in Belgrade and Serbia. The production notably featured Marija Jelenska as Portia, which gained her significant acclaim. She was also recognized for major roles such as the protagonist in Schiller’s Mary Stuart, Amalia in The Robbers, Judith in Uriel Acosta by Karl Gutzkow, and Vidosava in Miloš Obilić by Jovan Subotić, earning praise for her expressive and emotionally rich performances in tragic and romantic roles.

The newly founded ensemble of the National Theatre in Belgrade was a gathering of the best acting forces: they brought unrest to the capital and brought bohemianism, which would become famous in the eighties. The official prima donnas were: Milka Grgurova, Ljubica Kolarović and Marija Jelenska. Despite the constructed rivalry, Grgurova and Jelenska were friends. Due to numerous intrigues, Jelenska left Belgrade in 1871.

She left for Vienna in 1871, where in 1874 she played at the Residenz Theater and then the Burgtheater. In 1875 she performed in Graz, then moved to the Provincial German Theatre in Prague where she remained until 1877. She performed in Hamburg between 1878 and 1880, and then in Stuttgart until 1881.

She died in Barcelona, Spain.
