= Draga Gavrilović =

Serbian writer, pedagogue and translator

Draga or Draginja Karolina Gavrilović (Serbian Cyrillic: Драга или Драгиња Каролина Гавриловић; Srpska Crnja, 14 March 1854 – Srpska Crnja, Serbia, 25 February 1917) was a Serbian writer, pedagogue and translator. She is remembered as the first Serbian female novelist. Her work "Girl's Novel" from 1889 is considered a classic of the late 19th century.

== Biography ==
She was born in Srpska Crnja, then part of the Austrian Empire, on 14 March 1854, in a respectable trading family, to mother Milka and father Milan Gavrilović, as the eldest of eight children. She had five more sisters and two brothers, two of whom died early.

Her father worked as a school principal for a while. In the house, as well as her sisters and brothers spoke Serbian, Hungarian and German, she acquired a solid musical and literary education and was acquainted with literary events.

As an excellent student, she finished a four-year elementary school in 1865 in Novi Sad, after which she returned to her hometown and devoted herself to household chores, as the customs of the time required. Thanks to the United Serb Youth Movement, which raised the issue of "girls and their education", a Decree to have Girls École normale supérieure (modelled on the French educational system) built was passed in 1871, giving girls the right to regular schooling at the Teachers' College in Sombor. Draga belonged to one of the first generations of girls, who studied at the Teacher's College in Sombor from 1875 to 1978. Due to her fragile health, she was often absent from school and thus failed to achieve excellent results.

From 1888 to 1911, she worked as a teacher in Srpska Crnja, and for a short time in Zaječar. She participated in the youth movement and worked on the enlightenment of women in general. According to the testimonies of people from Srpska Crnja, who knew her, she was an activist and a true public teacher.

== Literary endeavours ==
She started working in literature immediately after finishing school. She wrote poems, short stories, and novels. She also translated texts from German and Hungarian. Her first poem, about the death of Đura Jakšić was published in Novi Sad's "Javor". She also published her first short stories in the same magazine, in the form of feuilleton and in 11 sequels. She also published important polemical texts and literary works in the Kikinda magazine "Sadašnjost", especially the short stories "Thoughts in the Theater", "A Week Before the Selection of Serfs in the Village" and "Pictures from Life". Her works were published in the newspapers Starmali, Neven, Novi Trebević, Orao, Bosanska vila, as well as Hacfelder Zeitung in German.

Her more extensive works include the short stories "Iz učiteljskog života" (1884) and "Dvojački roman" (1889), which were published in sequels. "Dvojački roman" abounds in autobiographical elements. That very novel was published in serial form in the magazine "Javor", because the editors of "Sadašnjosti" previously rejected it, considering it far too extensive. For "The Girl's Novel", Draga is now remembered as the first Serbian female novelist. According to a list found posthumously, which she made herself, she published a total of thirteen short stories, several articles and several children's poems, while unpublished and so far lost, other manuscripts of "Village Novel", as well as several short stories and articles in Serbian and German remain.

She often published her works under [pseudonym] or signed herself as "a teacher", "a public teacher" or "your sincere friend". She mostly wrote about the position and life of women in Serbian society, and her main characters were mostly teachers, writers, actresses, smart and rebellious girls or older unmarried women. She was openly a feminist, always evoking humanistic prose critical of the patriarchal model of society and the role of women in that society and, at the same time, confronted readers with myths about the attitude of Serbian society towards women. She advocated a change in the patriarchal model of society because it produces terror in the family, marriage, education, the clergy, literature and culture in general. In 1900, she published her last text in the newspaper "Sadšnjost", which she did not sign. On that occasion, she explained that she would stop publishing her works due to the lack of respect and insults she experienced.

She never married and had no children. She was in fragile health, since 1893 (from the age of 39) suffering from tuberculosis. Due to illness, she was often absent from work and in 1909, she retired.

She died in her hometown and was buried there, in the family tomb.She was 63.

== Legacy ==
One street in her hometown of Srpska Crnja is named after her.

Her works appeared exclusively in periodicals (magazines and newspapers), they were not printed in the form of separate books until 1990, when her "Collected Works" (Sabrana dela) were published in two volumes.

== Works ==
Monographs:

- Sabrana dela knjiga 1, Pesme, pripovetke 1990
- Sabrana dela knj. 2. Pripovetke, Devojački roman, Prevodi 1990
- Izabrana proza 2007

Articles and other similar texts:

- U spomen Đ. Jakšiću 1878
- Za slobodu 1879
- Nedelja pred izbor kmetova na selu 1884
- Slika iz života 1884
- Iz učiteljskog života 1884
- Misli u pozorištu 1884
- Diplomatski 1885
- Ko je kriv 1885
- Jedno za drugo 1886
- I ona je uskočila 1886
- Razume se onu lepšu 1886
- Mora se pokrenuti 1886
- Babadevojka 1887
- Šaljiva igra 1887
- Devojački roman 1889
- Orangutan 1889
- Poslednji članak 1889
- San 1889
- Ona je, srce mu kaže 1890
- Blagosloveno ricin ulje 1890
- Nekoliko iskrenih reči 1891
- Zašto greh napreduje 1892
- Pismo pobratimu 1894
- Radi nje 1896
- Njen greh 1896
- Pre Božića 1898
- Petao ga dovukao 1900
- Devojački roman, odlomak 1999

== See also ==
- Jelena Dimitrijević
- Milka Grgurova-Aleksić
- Danica Bandić
