= Darko Lungulov =

Serbian-American film director

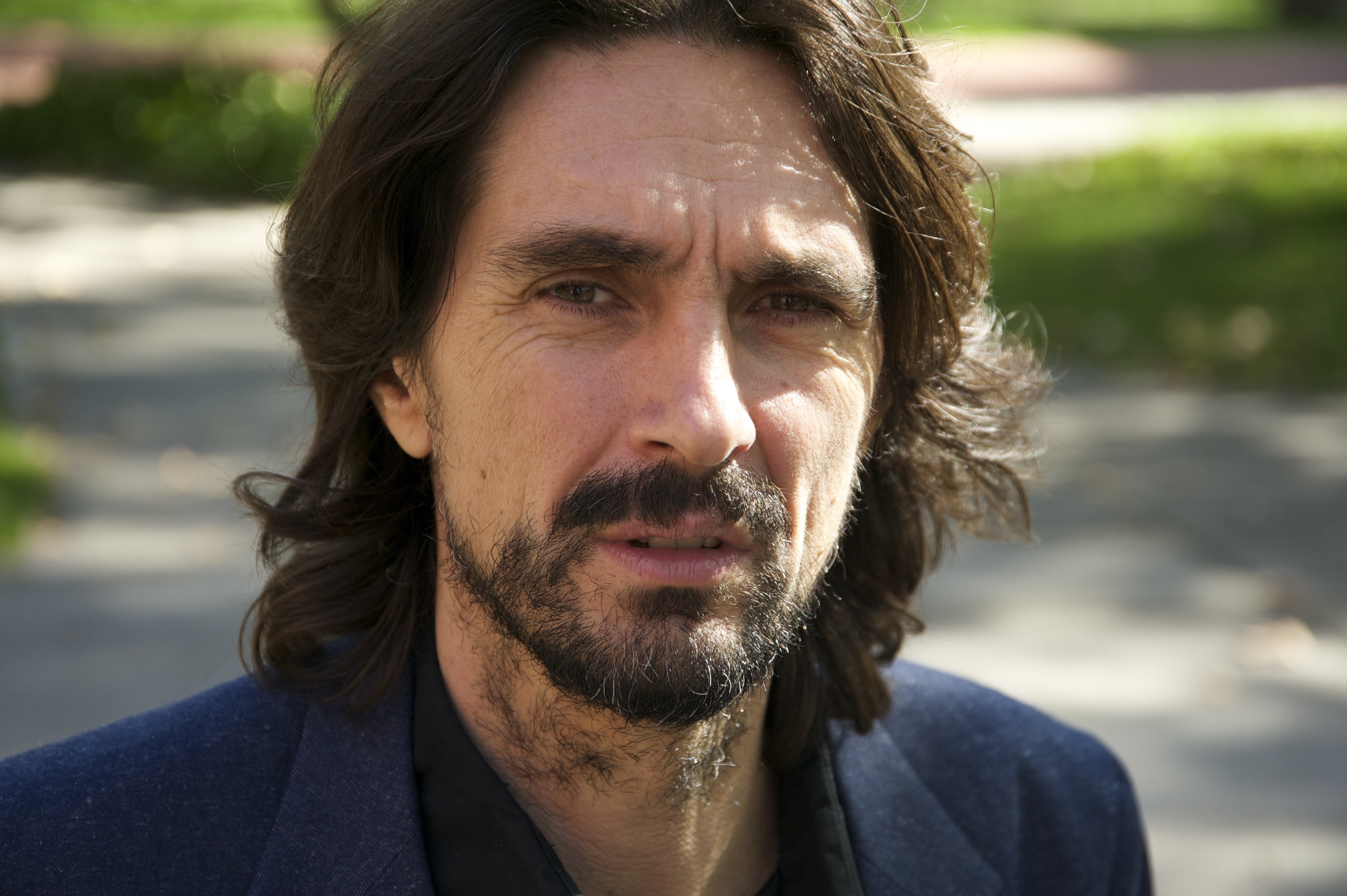

Darko Lungulov is a Serbian-American film director, screenwriter, and film producer.

== Biography ==
Born in Belgrade, Serbia, Lungulov graduated from the City College of New York with a B.F.A. in film and video.

In 2004, his documentary Escape won the Audience Award at the Hamptons International Film Festival. It was then screened at the IDFA, Leipzig, and GoEast film festivals.

Lungulov's debut feature, Here and There, won the Best NY Narrative Award at the 2009 Tribeca Film Festival. It received critical acclaim from The Hollywood Reporter, The New York Times, IndieWire, and Variety. It was theatrically released in the US, Germany, Switzerland, Hungary, and Greece. Here and There was initially voted to be the Serbian foreign-language Oscar candidate, but it was subsequently withdrawn because of "too much English language in the dialogue". Lungulov was voted Best Director by FIPRESCI Serbia in 2009. In 2010, Lungulov was a Tribeca Festival jury member.

Lungulov's dark comedy Monument to Michael Jackson, released in 2014, had its world premiere at the Karlovy Vary International Festival. It won the Eastern European Film Award at the 2015 Santa Barbara International Film Festival and the Grand Prix Award at the Nashville Film Festival. It received critical acclaim from Variety and Cineuropa.

Lungulov was one of the co-writers on A Good Wife – the directorial debut of Serbian actress Mirjana Karanović – which had its world premiere at the Sundance Fim Festival in 2016.
