= Here and There (2009 film) =

- Directed by: Darko Lungulov
- Written by: Darko Lungulov
- Produced by: Darko Lungulov; George Lekovic; David Nemer; Vladan Nikolic
- Starring: David Thornton; Branislav Trifunović; Cyndi Lauper; Mirjana Karanović; Jelena Mrđa; Antone Pagan
- Cinematography: Mathias Schöningh
- Distributed by: Vivendi Entertainment; Lightyear Entertainment
- Release date: April 22, 2009 (Tribeca)
- Country: Serbia
- Language: Serbian
- Budget: $300,000
- Box office: $18,000

Here and There (Serbian: Тамо и овде, romanized: Tamo i ovde) is a Serbian-German-USA coproduction which premiered at the Belgrade Film Festival FEST 2009. The World premiere was at Tribeca 2009 where the film has won the Best New York Narrative Award. Starring David Thornton and Branislav Trifunović with supporting turns from Cyndi Lauper, Mirjana Karanović, Jelena Mrđa and Antone Pagán.

Cyndi Lauper wrote and recorded a song for the Here and There soundtrack.

== Plot ==
Here and There follows two interconnected stories on two different continents. Robert (Thornton), a depressed New Yorker, tries to make quick cash and ends up in Serbia, where instead of money he finds his soul. At the same time, a young Serbian immigrant, Branko (Trifunović), struggles in an unforgiving New York as he tries to buy then fix a work moving van with a streetsmart and shrewd mechanic, Jose Escobar (Antone Pagán) who played him well, as Branko desperately tries to make money to bring his girlfriend from Serbia to the United States. Mirjana Karanović plays Branko's mother.

== Release ==
Here and There was filmed in two parts: September 2007 (the New York City part) and in March 2008 (Belgrade part) and competed at the 2009 Tribeca Film Festival in New York City in the World Narrative Competition and was named Best New York Narrative. Other film festivals in which the film competed in were the Ft Lauderdale International Film Festival (winning the Jury Award), Geneva Cinéma Tout Ecran (winning FIPRESCI Prize and Best Director for Lungulov) and Skip City International D-Cinema Festival (winning the Special Jury Prize). Actor and occasional producer Antone Pagán optimistically supported this independent Serbian directed film and assisted in getting it submitted and accepted into several film festivals including Skip City in Japan where it garnered awards.

The film was released to theaters in North America on May 14, 2010. Elsewhere, the film was released in Hungary on March 25, 2010 and Germany on April 22, 2010.

The film was one of the earliest Netflix streamed films from 2010-2012 and it was screened at Showtime USA for two years 2010-2012.

The film was initially voted as Serbian foreign-language Oscar candidate but later disqualified due to "too much English language in dialogue" and the 2nd-placed film was submitted instead.

== Reception ==
=== Box office ===
Here and There played for 18 weeks in the US, widest release 5 theaters, grossing an estimated $27,156.

=== Critical response ===
"It gave us not only New York, it gave us great characters, a great story, it gave us the world." Tribeca Festival's jury statement for the Best New York Narrative Award

Some Internet critics described Here and There as one of the top 10 films to see at Tribeca.

Based on 11 reviews collected by Rotten Tomatoes, Here and There was at 73% fresh.

Variety's Ronnie Schieb described the film as a "Slight, extremely likable pic... with an outside chance at arthouse play before cable beckons."

Los Angeles Times's Kevin Thomas opined that the film is "a wisp of a wry comedy but Lungulov's touch is delicate, even piercingly so, and his direction of actors, especially Thornton and Karanovic, is beautifully nuanced."

The Hollywood Reporter's Natasha Senjanovic felt that the film was "Elegantly minimalistic, superbly played and surprisingly feel-good, in the best sense of the word."

Time Out New York's David Fear only gave the film 2 stars feeling that the film "has too much hipness, too little heart."

Awards
New title	Serbian Oscar of Popularity; The Movie of the Year; 2009	Succeeded by Montevideo, Bog te video!
