= Monument to Michael Jackson (film) =

2014 film

- Film poster
- Directed by: Darko Lungulov
- Written by: Darko Lungulov
- Starring: Boris Milivojevic
- Release dates: 8 July 2014 (KVIF); 29 October 2014 (Serbia)
- Running time: 95 minutes
- Country: Serbia
- Language: Serbian

Monument to Michael Jackson (Serbian: Споменик Мајклу Џексону / Spomenik Majklu Džeksonu) is a 2014 Serbian comedy film directed by Darko Lungulov. It was one of six films shortlisted by Serbia to be their submission for the Academy Award for Best Foreign Language Film at the 88th Academy Awards, but it lost out to Enclave.

== Cast ==
- Boris Milivojevic as Marko
- Branislav Trifunovic as Dragan
- Toni Mihajlovski as Doki
- Natasa Tapuskovic as Ljubinka
- Dragan Bjelogrlic as Dusan
- Srdjan Miletic as Radio spiker and Tajkun Djordje
- Ljubomir Bandovic as Pop
