= Goose Feather =

2004 film

- Directed by: Ljubisa Samardzic
- Starring: Branislav Trifunović; Kalina Kovačević
- Release date: 8 August 2004
- Running time: 94 min
- Country: Serbia and Montenegro
- Language: Serbian

Goose Feather is a 2004 Serbian film directed by Ljubiša Samardžić. Its original Serbian language title is Jesen stiže, Dunjo moja (Serbian Cyrillic: Јесен стиже, дуњо моја).

It was Serbia and Montenegro's submission to the 77th Academy Awards for the Academy Award for Best Foreign Language Film, but was not accepted as a nominee.

== Cast ==
- Branislav Trifunović - Sava Ladjarski
- Kalina Kovačević - Anica Granfild
- Marija Karan - Marija Stanimirovic
- Igor Đorđević - Kum Petrasin
- Marta Uzelac - Dunja
- Rada Đuričin - Savina majka
- Vojislav Brajović - Savin otac
- Predrag Ejdus - Gazda Granfild
- Renata Ulmanski - Gospodja Blavacki
- Slobodan Ninković - Timotije
- Milorad Mandić - Skeledzija
- Boris Milivojević - Ciganin
- Branimir Brstina - Vlasnik carde
- Eva Ras - gospodja Marta

== See also ==
- Cinema of Serbia
- List of submissions to the 77th Academy Awards for Best Foreign Language Film
- List of Serbian submissions for the Academy Award for Best Foreign Language Film
