= Branislav Trifunović =

Serbian actor (born 1978)

- Бранислав Трифуновић
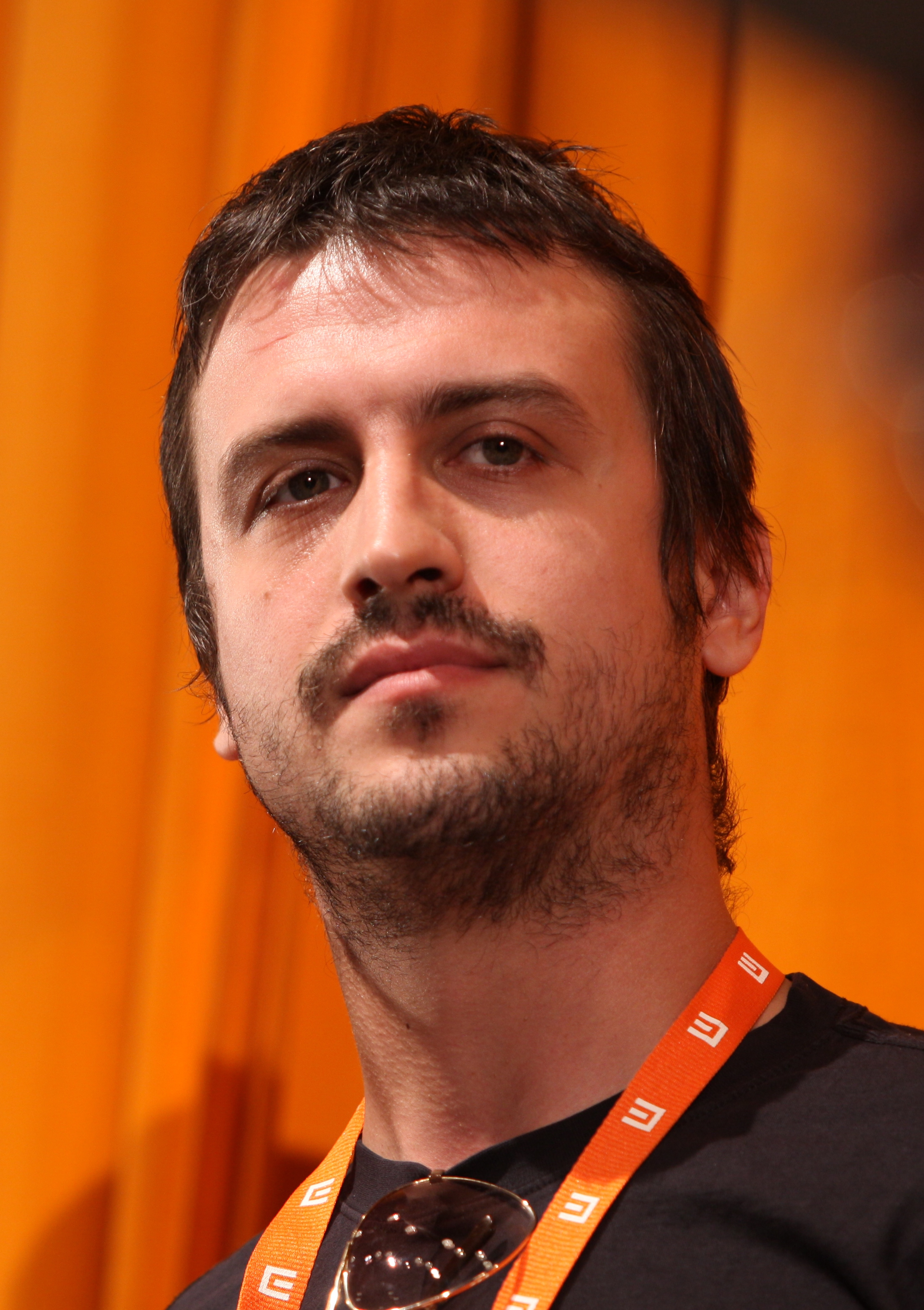
- Trifunović in 2009
- Born: 16 January 1978 (age 48); Kruševac, SR Serbia, SFR Yugoslavia
- Other name: Bane Trifunović
- Occupation: Actor
- Years active: 1995–present
- Relatives: Sergej Trifunović (brother)

Branislav "Bane" Trifunović (Serbian Cyrillic: Бранислав "Бане" Трифуновић; born 16 January 1978) is a Serbian actor and film producer.

== Biography ==
Trifunović made numerous award-winning appearances in films, including Goose Feather, A View from Eiffel Tower, Wait for Me and I Will Not Come, Here and There and Monument to Michael Jackson.

He is also known for his active and prolific career on stage.

He voiced Boog in the Serbian dub of the Open Season franchise.

== Personal life ==
Trifunović was born to Tomislav, an actor, and Slobodanka, a lawyer. His elder brother, Sergej (born 1972), is also an actor. In 2007, he stated that it had taken a lot of effort to stop being referred as "Sergej Trifunović's younger brother". He is a Red Star Belgrade supporter.

== Filmography ==
Year	Title	Original Title	Role	Notes
2000	Dragan and Madlaina	Dragan i Madlaina	Dragan	(TV Film)
2004	Goose Feather	Jesen stiže, dunjo moja	Sava Lađarski	
2005	A View from Eiffel Tower	Pogled sa Ajfelovog tornja	Vanja	
2006	Seven and a Half	Sedam i po	Keboja	(Also producer)
2006	Don't Turn from the Path	Ne skreći sa staze	Serbian Santa Claus	(TV Film)
2007	Jar Full of Air	Tegla puna vazduha	Svetozar	(TV Film)
2007	Goose Feather	Jesen stiže, dunjo moja	Sava Lađarski	(TV Series) Adaptation of the film
2009	Here and There	Tamo i ovde	Branko	
2009	Wait for Me and I Will Not Come	Čekaj me, ja sigurno neću doći	Nemanja	
2010	That Thing Like Love	Ono kao ljubav	Himself	(TV Series) Episode Role
2012	Loveless Zoritsa	Crna Zorica	Mane	
2015	Monument to Michael Jackson			
2026	3 Weeks After	3 nedelje posle		Crystal Globe Competition

== Awards and nominations ==
Year	Award	Category	Work	Result
2004	Niš National Film Festival	Best Achievement in Acting	Goose Feather	Won
2004	Niš National Film Festival	Actor of the Festival	Goose Feather	Won
2004	Novi Sad International Film Festival	Best Young Actor	Goose Feather	Won
