= Radivoje Dinulović =

Radivoje Dinulović (born Rudolf Benedikt; 1 August 1880 – 3 August 1941) was an actor, theater director, manager and founder of several theaters in Yugoslavia and Serbia.

== Biography ==
Rudolf Benedikt was born on 1 August 1880 in Belgrade, Principality of Serbia, in a Jewish family. As a young man, his father, a wealthy merchant, sent him to school in Vienna, then to Switzerland. Rudolf loved acting, and when he returned to Serbia, his father renounced him for giving up his trading career and schooling. He was then adopted by Svetislav Dinulović, a traveling actor and comedian, and Mirjana Dinulović, who gave him the name Radivoje Dinulović. He completed high school.

He entered the stage for the first time, as an actor, 1895 in the traveling company Đura-Đoka Protić in Valjevo, and stayed there until 1897. From 1897 to 1900, he was, first, an assistant screenwriter Mihailo Risantijević, and then an independent screenwriter at National Theater in Belgrade. From 1900 to 1912 he worked at the Croatian National Theater in Osijek, except for 1906 and 1907, when he was in the traveling troupe Petar Ćirić.

From 1913 to 1914 he was engaged in Dubrovnik Theater. He spent part of the occupation during World War I in the Nežider Camp, where he also worked in the theater. After two years, the Austrians released him from the camp because his wife was a citizen Austro-Hungary. He became a member of the Croatian National Theatre in Varaždin in 1916.

In 1917 he founded, together with the actor Nikola Hajdušković a traveling theater. From 1917 to 1919 they traveled and gave performances throughout Bosnia and Herzegovina, including Sarajevo, Montenegro, Dalmatia and Vojvodina. From 1920 to 1922 he was a director, Administrative Secretary and Technical Chief of the Sarajevo National Theatre.

From 1923 until 1925 he was, one of the founders, manager, and director of the National Theatre in Subotica, from 1925 to 1927, director and artistic director of the City Theater in Bitola, in 1928, director in National Theater in Leskovac. From 1928 to 1929, again, the director of the City Theater in Bitola, under the direction of Robert-Matek Matijević, and then significantly contributed to the merger of that theater with the City Theater in Niš, whereby Moravian Theater Banovina.

He worked as a director at the Moravian Banovina Theater from 1932 until 1935 when he retired, but in the same year, he was reactivated and appointed director of the Princely Serbian Theatre in Kragujevac.

He celebrated the fortieth anniversary of his artistic work on 12 February 1935, in Niš. He was awarded the Order of Saint Sava. When the Nazis occupied Serbia, he took refuge in Vrnjci near Vrnjačka Banja. He could hardly bear the burden of uncertainty because he did not know what was wrong with his daughter and son. Not wanting to be discovered by the Gestapo, he decided to end his life and hang himself.

Wife Slava Marković and daughter Mila Veličković were actresses, and the son Predrag Dinulović continued his father's tradition of acting and directing, working with Soja Jovanović.

=== Directions ===
Radivoje Danulović directed the works:

- Comrades
- Impure blood
