= Aleksandar Radenkovic =

German actor

Aleksandar Radenković (born December 17, 1979) is a German actor.

== Life ==
Radenković was born on December 17, 1979, in Novi Sad, SR Serbia, Yugoslavia. He studied acting at the Hochschule für Musik und Theater "Felix Mendelssohn Bartholdy". After finishing his studies Wolfgang Engel offered him to play at Schauspiel Leipzig. From the Season 2008/2009 he is going to play for Deutsches Schauspielhaus Hamburg.

== Appearances ==
- Friedrich Schiller – Wallenstein (Max Piccolomini, Regie: Wolfgang Engel)
- Bulgakov – Molière oder die Verschwörung der Heuchler (Zacharie Moyron, Regie: Wolfgang Engel)
- Christoph Hein – Horns Ende (Thomas, Regie: Armin Petras)
- Hans Magnus Enzensberger – Die Tochter der Luft (Menon, Regie: Konstanze Lauterbach)
- William Shakespeare – Kaufmann von Venedig (Salerio, Regie: Wolfgang Engel)
- Simon Stephens – Motortown (Tom, Regie: Marc Lunghuß)
- Heinrich von Kleist – Der zerbrochene Krug (Licht, Regie: Deborah Epstein)
- Wilhelmine von Hillern – Geierwally (Vinzenz, Regie: Markus Dietz)
- Fausto Paravidino – Peanuts (Buddy, Regie: Thomas Dehler)
- Ulrich Plenzdorf – Paul und Paula (Paul, Regie: Uta Koschel)
- Pierre Carlet de Chamblain – Der Streit (Mesrin, Regie: Albert Lang)
