= Mirjana Gardinovački =

Serbian film and theatre actress

Mirjana Gardinovachki
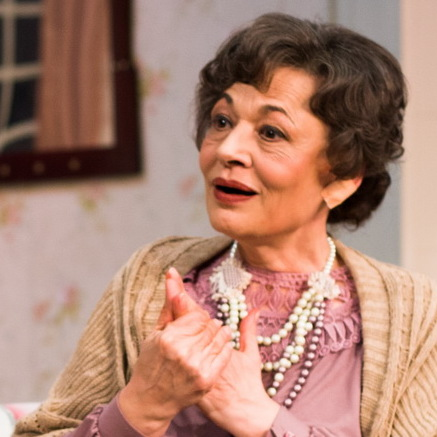
- Born: Mirjana Andjelkovic; 25 May 1950 (age 75); Čitluk, Kruševac
- Education: Serbian National Theatre
- Occupation: actor
- Employer: Serbian National Theatre
- Spouse: Stevan Gardinovacki

Mirjana Gardinovachki born Marjana Andjelkovic (born 1950) is a Serbian film and theatre actress. She was a leading player at the Serbian National Theatre from the 1970s.

== Life ==
She was born in the village or area known as Čitluk near the city of Kruševac in Serbia.

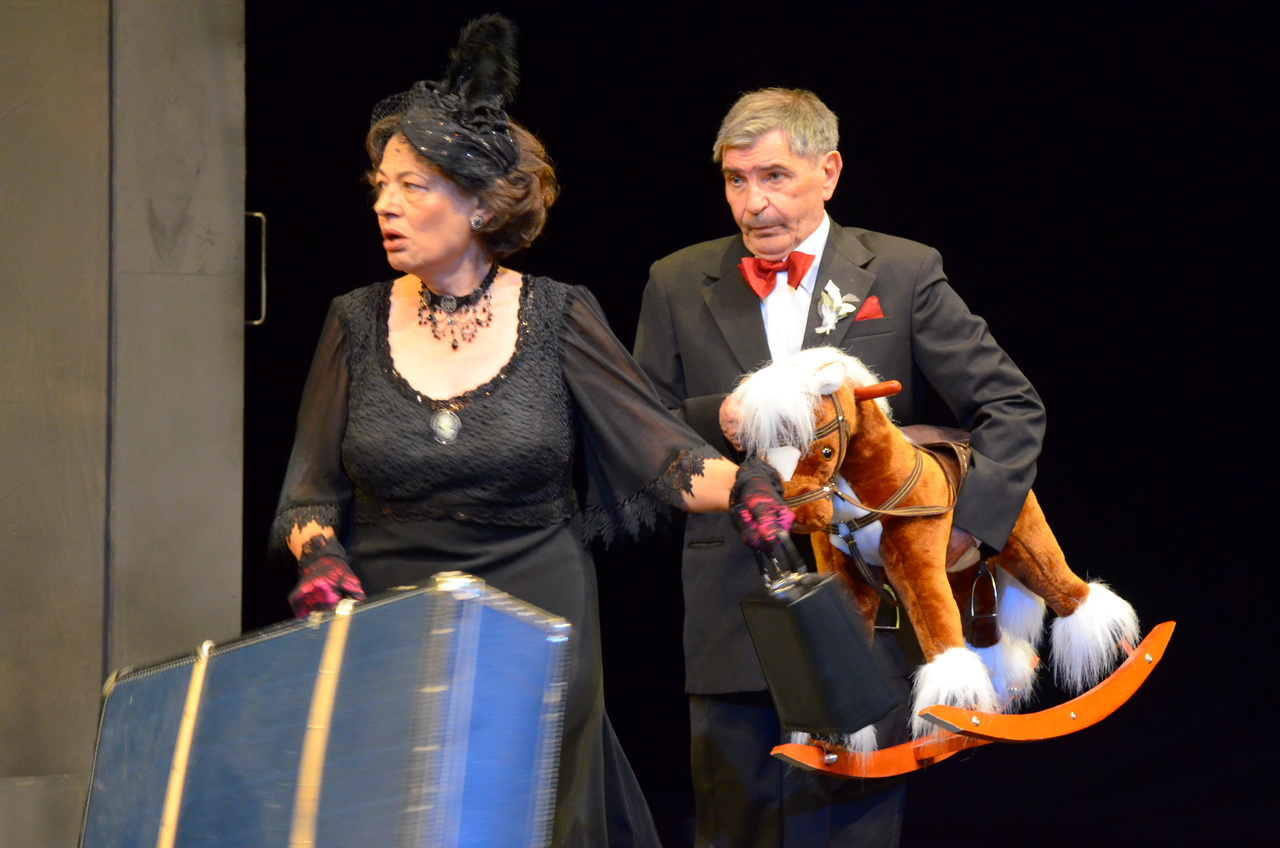
"Burlesque Tragedy" by Dušan Kovačević at the Serbian National Theatre, 2011/12; Mirjana Gardinovački (left), Mihailo Janketić (right)

She started acting as an amateur in her home city under her birth name of Mirjana Andjelkovic . She graduated from the Drama Studio at the Serbian National Theater in 1970, and in the same year joined that company.

She gained the status of a drama champion in Serbia. She played both dramatic and character roles and she was an audience favourite. She appeared in TV films as well as on the stage.

In 2018 she appeared as Rebecca Ners in The Witches of Salem, Arthur Miller. It was directed and adapted by Nikita Milivojevic. In 2020 she was said to be retired.

== Awards include ==
She won an award for one of her first major roles as Eva in Vučjak in 1974 which was directed by Želimir Orešković. She took another award in 1984 for the role of Leokadija Begbik in Brecht's Man is Human in 1984 and in 1993 she took another for the role of Juca in Kir Janja. She also appeared at Užice's Theatrical Festival in where she won an award for playing Ardalione in Stone for the Head. She won two Steria awards in 1993 and 1995.

In 2002 she was given the Gold Medal "Jovan Djordjevic".

== Private life ==
She was married to another leading actor Stevan Gardinovacki in 1972. He died in 2011.
