= Ljubomir Ristić =

Serbian actor and former basketball player

Personal information
- Born: May 1, 1990 (age 36) Belgrade, SFR Yugoslavia
- Listed height: 6 ft 8 in (2.03 m)
- Listed weight: 203 lb (92 kg)

Career information
- NBA draft: 2012: undrafted
- Playing career: 2009–2013
- Position: Shooting guard / small forward

Career history
- 2009–2011: ABS Primorje
- 2012–2013: Železničar Inđija
Medals
Representing Serbia and Montenegro
U16 European Championship
Bronze medal – third place	2006 Spain	Team

Ljubomir Ristić (Cyrillic: Љубомир Ристић, born May 1, 1990) is a Serbian actor and former professional basketball player.

== Basketball player ==
He last played for Železničar from Inđija.

== Actor ==
After his professional basketball career ended at the age of 23, Ristić studied acting. His debut was in the 2016 short film Fanatik.

== Filmography ==
- Iztine i Lazi (2018)
- Moja Generacija Z (2019)
- The Outpost (2021, episode 6, as Josa)
