= Angela Gregovic =

Serbian actress

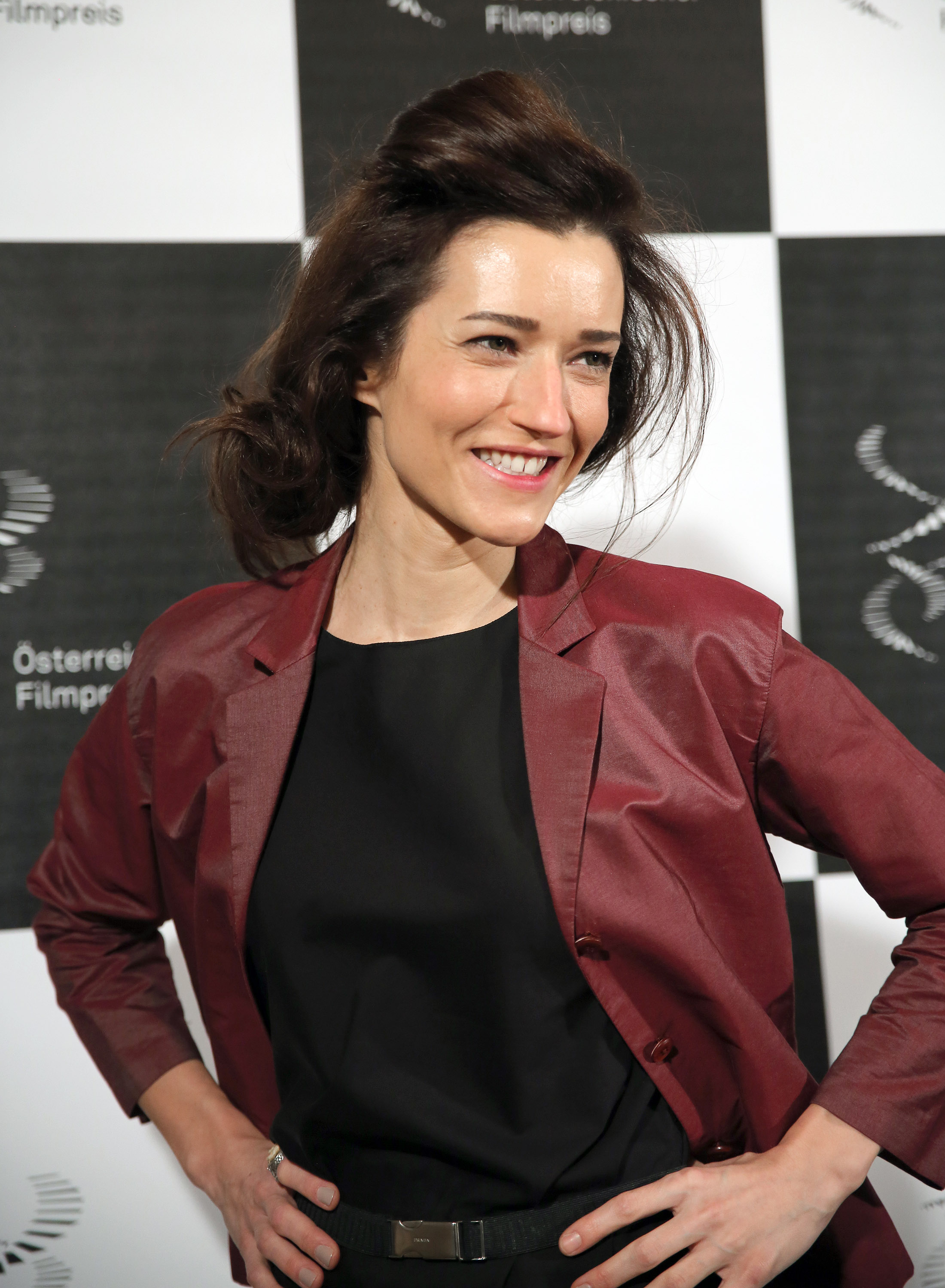
Angela Gregovic, 2013

Angela Gregovic (born Andjela Gregovic; September 26, 1978) is a Serbian-Italian actress and performer.

== Education ==
In Serbia, Angela Gregovic studied with pianist Bozena Griner. She graduated from University of Arts, Faculty of Music Belgrade, with B.A. degree Professional Musician – Concert Pianist (1999).

Gregovic took postgraduate courses at IUAV University, Faculty of Design and Arts, Venice, Italy, getting M.A. degree in Theatre Sciences and Techniques (2007).

She studied acting with Gordana Maric, Sam Schacht, Alithea Phillips and Carl Ford.

Gregovic speaks Serbian, Italian, German, English, Russian and some French.

== Career ==
In 2001 Gregovic was cast as The Terrorist in Roger Avary’s film adaptation of Bret Easton Ellis’ Glitterati.

In early 2006, she made her directorial debut with Mozart and Salieri, chamber opera by Nikolai Rimsky-Korsakov, National Theatre in Belgrade, Serbia.

The season 2006-07 of Teatro Due di Parma opened with The Communist Manifesto, project coordinated by German composer Heiner Goebbels. Angela Gregovic took part in it with her lecture performance Tito’s Last Pioneer.

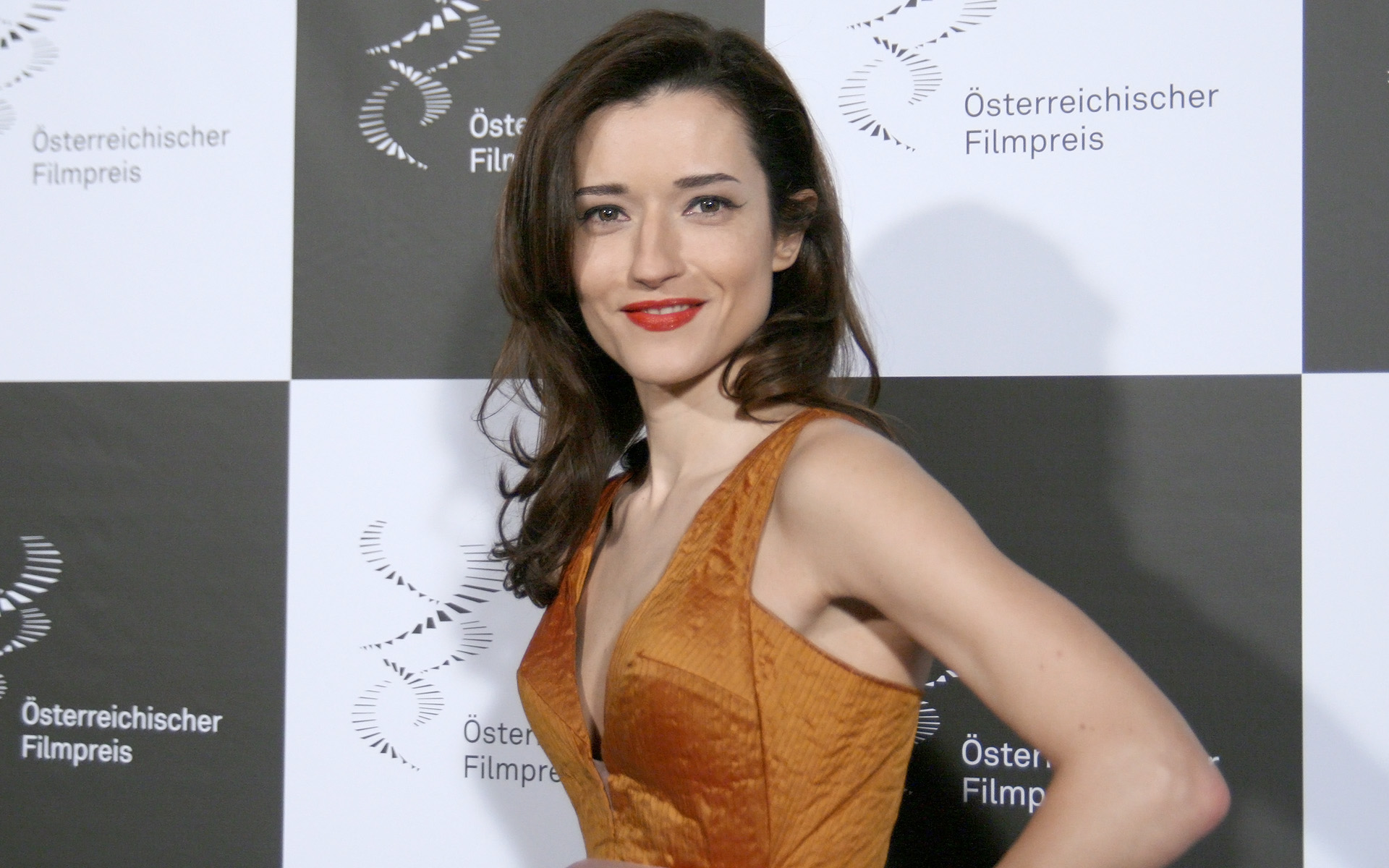
Angela Gregovic at the Austrian Film Awards 2012

In 2010, among Josef Bierbichler, Denis Moschitto and Manuel Rubey, she was cast by Austrian screenwriter and director Thomas Roth in Brand. In order to prepare for the role of Angela Caymaz, she checked into treatment for patients affected by BPD. She also worked in a general hospital as trainee nurse for several months. Brand premiered in 2011 in Vienna, Austria.

In 2012 Angela Gregovic was nominated Best Actress for her role in Brand by the Austrian Film Academy.

In December 2013 she was cast in the Juri Rechinsky film Ugly. The film premiered Jan. 2017 at International Film Festival Rotterdam, in Bright Future Section.

She began filming Tatort – Das Tor zur Hölle, her third collaboration with director Thomas Roth, in June 2021.

Although she has never competed as martial artist, she has been associated with the Taekwondo training community.
