= Vela Nigrinova =

Stage actress

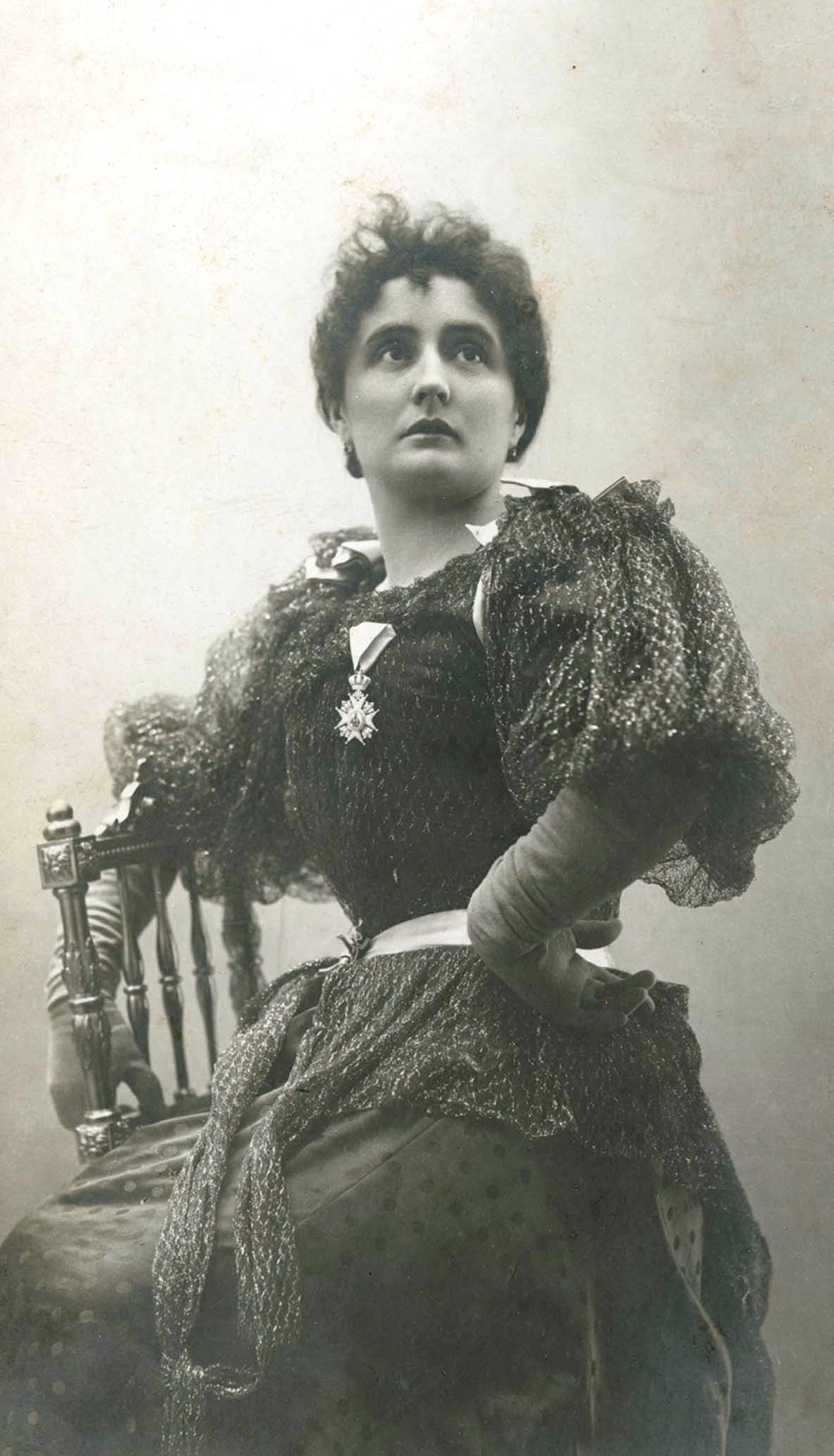
Vela Nigrinova, Belgrade 1895

Vela Nigrin (Serbian Cyrillic: Вела Нигринова; 14 November 1862 – 31 December 1908; born Augusta Nigrin) was a Slovenian-Serbian stage actress who performed in Belgrade in the latter part of the 19th century.

== Life and work ==
Nigrinova's father, August was a railway official whose daughters Marija, Gizela, Matilda, and Augusta were all actresses or singers. Nigrinova first appeared on the stage of the Slovenian Dramatic Society on 19 April 1876 as "Lady Clarens" in the play "Lowood Orphan". Davorin Jenko the director of the Serbian Theater in 1882 contracted her for the National Theater in Belgrade. She soon became one of the first artists of this theater and opportunities for the most demanding roles opened up for her.

During her stage career she performed extensively in Prague, Sofia, and Zagreb; she also occasionally visited Ljubljana, where she was met with mixed reviews.

== Legacy ==
The Serbian government issued a commemorative stamp in her honor and also there is a street in Belgrade that was named after her.
