= Miloš Cvetić =

Serbian actor and writer

- Born: 1845; Čurug, Austrian Empire
- Died: 1905; Belgrade, Kingdom of Serbia

Miloš Cvetić (1845–1905) was a Serbian actor and writer. His contemporaries were Serbian actors Aleksa Bačvanski, Milka Grgurova-Aleksić, Pera Dobrinović and Toša Jovanović.

He was the director and actor of the Serbian National Theater in Novi Sad, the Croatian National Theater in Zagreb and the National Theater in Belgrade.

He wrote several historical plays, including Nemanja, Todor od Salaća, Miloš Veliki, Lazar, Karađorđe.
