= Milka Grgurova-Aleksić =

Serbian stage actress

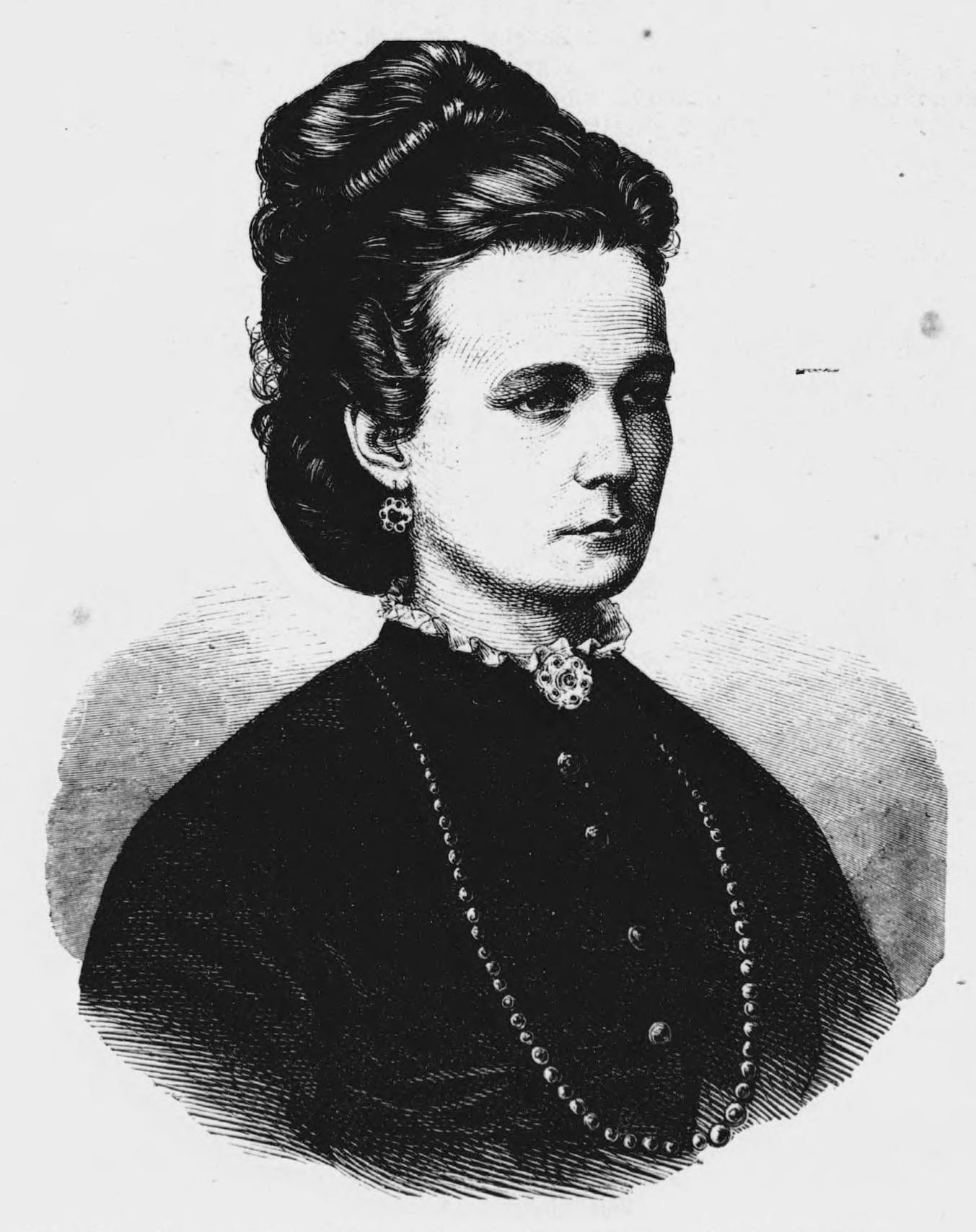
- Born: 14 February 1840; Sombor, Austrian Empire
- Died: 25 March 1924 (aged 84); Belgrade, Kingdom of Serbs, Croats, and Slovenes
- Occupation(s): Actress, Writer, Translator

Milka Grgurova-Aleksić (Sombor, 14 February 1840 — Belgrade, 25 March 1924) was a Serbian stage actress who starred in some of the most popular Serbian plays of the second half of the nineteenth and early twentieth centuries, including the role of Ljubica in Mejrima by Matija Ban, Posmrtna slava kneza Mihaila by Djordje Maletić, Jaquinta, the wife of Constantine Bodin, in the drama by the same name by Dragutin Ilić, and many more. She also starred in some of the most popular Serbian adaptations of plays by foreign playwrights, notably Shakespeare's Romeo and Juliet. Her contemporaries were actors Miloš Cvetić and Pera Dobrinović.

She was also a short story writer. Her literary career started as a translator. In order to improve the repertoire of the National Theatre in Belgrade, Grgurova translated from French plays, including a book of stories by Edmond About. Grgurova kept a correspondence with many of her contemporaries writers, Mileva Simić (1858–1954), Jelena Dimitrijević, Draga Gavrilović, Katarina Milovuk, Savka Subotić, Kosara Cvetković (1868–1953), and others.

== Early life and career ==
She was born Milka Grgurov, daughter of Sofia and Sava Grgurov, a wealthy Sombor merchant. As soon as she finished high school she married a man that her parents picked out for her. After the birth of her daughter Evica and two years into the marriage she left her husband and came back to live with her parents with her daughter.

She always loved acting even as a child she imagined playing roles and now with most of her close friends involved in the Touring Amateur Theatre in Sobor, she began seriously considering it as a career. Although the theatre company included some of her relatives, Milka's parents initially disapproved of her choice of profession. At that time, acting was not generally accepted by everyone as a respectable profession, though a change was beginning to take place. Milka made her first amateur acting debut with the Sombor touring theatre company in early 1862. Her premiere was a success although she felt she needed to learn more about acting and the theatre. That same year she enrolled at a Women's College in Belgrade where she attended classes in literature and drama.

In 1864, Milka won her first professional success as Ljubica in Matija Ban's Mejrima. This brought her to the attention of Jovan Đorđević, who immediately signed her up as a member of the National Theatre in Belgrade. She was engaged to appear in all the theatrical productions scheduled for that season. There was no turning back for her and for the next 40 years her life was dedicated exclusively to the stage.

She traveled in all of our Serbian lands from Vojvodina which was part of the Habsburg Empire to Bosnia and Hercegovina which was part of another empire -- Ottoman—and in Mostar she made a great impression on her Serbian public whether Orthodox or Muslim. In 1903, she wrote about her experiences in Mostar in the magazine Bosanska Vila.

In her career that spanned four decades, she performed in more than 400 roles on the stage. Today, she is celebrated both as a great actress and a talented short story. Grgurova's stories include Ciganka (Gypsy Girl) and Ljubav jedne plemenite devojke (A Kind Girl's Love) which even today provoke important political issues in Serbian society.
