= Toša Jovanović =

Serbian actor (1845–1893)

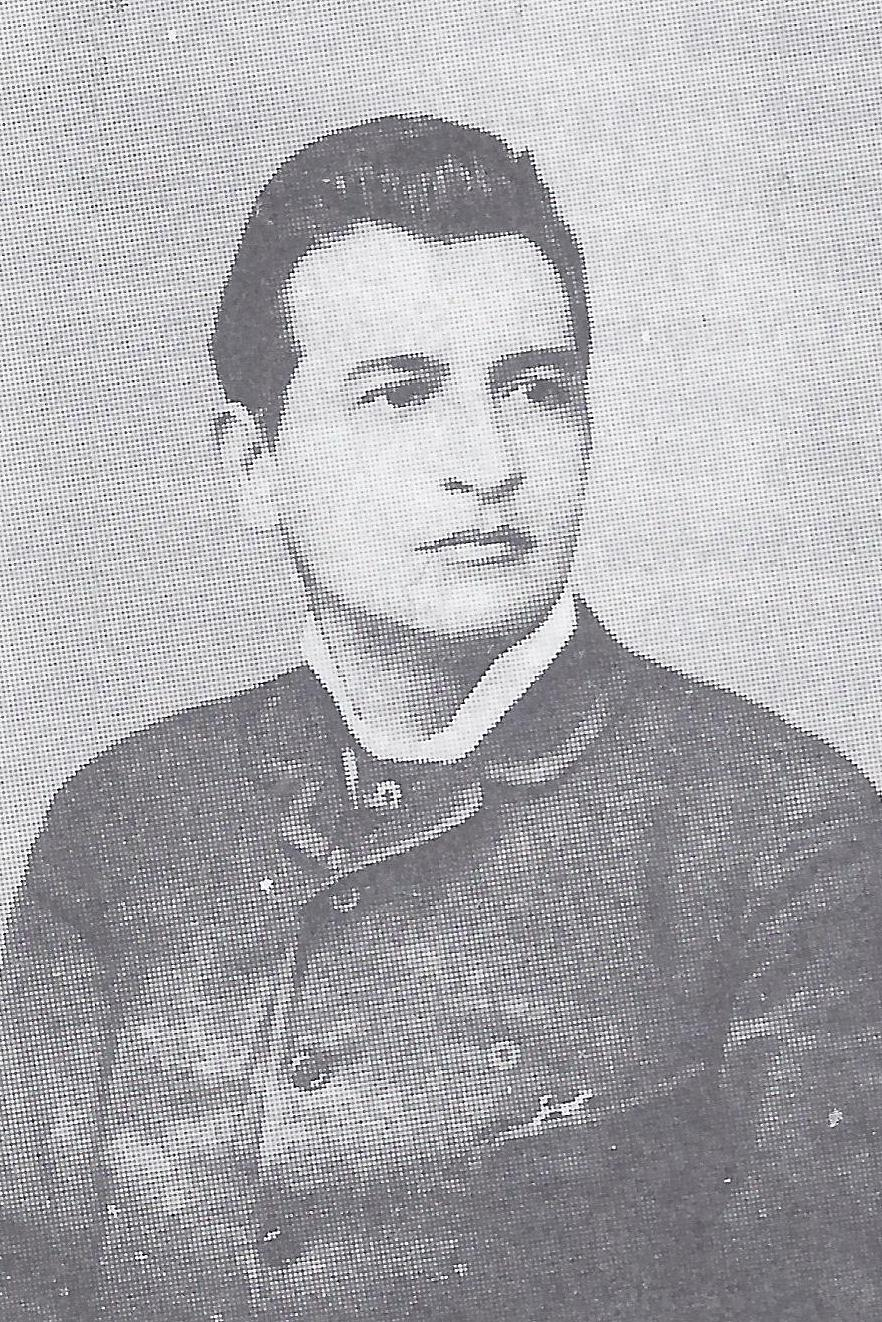
Toša Jovanović

Todor "Toša" Jovanović (June 2, 1845 – February 17, 1893) was a Serbian actor of the 19th century who had significant careers in both Serbia and Austria-Hungary. He was a member of Croatian National Theatre in Zagreb and National Theatre in Belgrade.

He was famous for his actings of characters of lovers and heroes. The National theatre in Zrenjanin is named after him.
