= Zanka (disambiguation) =

Zanka may refer to:

Places

- Zanka (Tanzanian ward), an administrative ward in Tanzania
- Zánka, a village in Veszprém county, Hungary

People

- Mathias Jørgensen (born 1990), Danish footballer known as Zanka
- Žanka Stokić (1887–1947), Serbian actress
