= The Robbery of the Third Reich =

2004 film

- Directed by: Zdravko Šotra
- Written by: Miodrag Andrić
- Produced by: Miroslav Mitić
- Starring: Dragan Nikolić; Nikola Đuričko; Katarina Žutić; Isidora Minić
- Cinematography: Miodrag Mirić
- Edited by: Petar Putniković
- Music by: Nenad Milosavljević
- Production companies: Dream company RTS
- Release date: 16 February 2004
- Running time: 105 min
- Country: FR Yugoslavia
- Language: Serbian

The Robbery of the Third Reich (Serbian: Pljačka Trećeg rajha, Serbian Cyrillic: Пљачка Трећег рајха) is a 2004 Serbian comedy film directed by Zdravko Šotra.

The film premiered on February 17, 2004 in Sava Centar.

== Plot ==
In the early spring of 1941, when Hitler began to conquer Europe, burglars and forgers started to flock to Belgrade; among them being Glavonja and Kalauz. They have robbed many banks and are known to police throughout Europe. Glavonja is an intelligent and thoughtful polyglot. He is offended when they call him a thief - he is an inspired thief, ready for great undertakings and has a highly developed self-awareness about his skills. Kalauz is his opposite. He is simple-minded, greedy for everything that shines in front of his eyes and prone to random petty thefts. It was his fault that he and Glavonja fail during their first venture in Belgrade. The story begins with the arrest of Glavonja and Kalauz after one of their operations.

Since they consider themselves better than other prisoners, they refuse to eat prison food and help themselves to the officers' food, which gets them thrown in solitary confinement. When the Kingdom of Yugoslavia was occupied by Germany, both Glavonja and Kalauz became German prisoners. In 1941, the Germans moved into the most beautiful villas in Belgrade, one being a German colonel with a beautiful young wife. He has trouble opening a safe he found in the villa and orders that Glavonja and Kalauz be brought to him to help. They take advantage of the situation and manage to escape. Through their friends, they obtain German documents stating that they are Hitler's relatives and great heroes of the German Reich. They say goodbye to their wives and children and go to Berlin to "work", believing that the best work can be found there. Impersonation helps them become part of the local elite and allows them to carry out a lot of successful operations - until they are imprisoned again, but not for long.

== Cast ==
- Dragan Nikolić as Glavonja
- Nikola Đuričko as Kalauz
- Katarina Zutic as Rosa
- Isidora Minić as Desa
- Vojin Ćetković as Franc Beme
- Katarina Radivojević as Ana Muci
- Predrag Ejdus as Bankar Rajner
- Tihomir Stanić as Colonel Muci
- Bogdan Diklić as Doctor
- Milorad Mandić as bum
- Bata Paskaljević as Jew Moša
- Goran Daničić as Schwartzkopf
- Dragomir Čumić as Ćora

== Background ==
The film is a comedy based on a true event, written by Miodrag Andrić and adapted into film by director Zdravko Šotra.

== Awards ==
Isidora Minić received the Statueta Sloboda Award for the best female role in the film at the Film Festival in Sopot.
