= Bela lađa =

Serbian comedy television series

- Srećko Šojić (Milan Lane Gutović) on the nave with his colleague Tihomir Stojković (Predrag Smiljković).
- Genre: Comedy
- Written by: Siniša Pavić; Ljiljana Pavić (collaborator)
- Directed by: Mihajlo Vukobratović; Ivan Stefanović (2008–2012)
- Starring: Milan Lane Gutović (2006–2011); Petar Kralj (2006–2011); Ljiljana Dragutinović; Mina Lazarević; Nenad Jezdić; Milenko Zablaćanski (2006–2008); Dubravka Mijatović (2006–2010); Predrag Smiljković; Branimir Brstina (2012)
- Ending theme: “Plovi bela lađa” Milan Lane Gutović (2006–2011); Milan Vasić (2012)
- Composer: Vojkan Borisavljević
- Country of origin: Serbia
- Original language: Serbian
- No. of seasons: 6
- No. of episodes: 90

Production
- Executive producer: Zoran Janković
- Production locations: Belgrade, Serbia
- Cinematography: Miloš Spasojević (2006–2007); Zoran Petrović (2008–2012)
- Editors: Božidar Nikolić (editor-in-chief); Lana Vukobratović; Tihomir Dukić; Slobodan Terzić
- Running time: 50 minutes
- Production companies: RTS; Košutnjak Film

Original release
- Network: RTS
- Release: 17 December 2006 – 1 April 2012

Related
- A Tight Spot; Bolji život Srećni ljudi Porodično blago Stižu dolari Junaci našeg doba

Bela lađa (Serbian: Бела лађа, Bela lađa, Serbian pronunciation: [bɛ̂ːlaː lâːdʑa]; The White Boat/A White Ship) is a Serbian comedy television series broadcast from December 2006 until April 2012 on Radio Television of Serbia. The series was produced by Radio-television of Serbia with executive production by Košutnjak film. The screenplay was written by Siniša Pavić and Mihajlo Vukobratović directed the series. The series is a loose continuation of the A Tight Spot film series.

== Plot ==
The story centers on the former businessman turned politician Srećko Šojić, played by Milan Lane Gutović. The story also parodies how politicians and society actually can be.

With its 26.7% share of the audience (2,610,428 watchers) it was one of top ten most popular TV shows in Serbia according to AGB Nielsen Media Research.

== Cast and characters ==
- Milan Lane Gutović as Srećko Šojić, illiterate politician and the leader of the Common Sense Party
- Petar Kralj as Dimitrije Pantić, Šojić's former co-worker and retiree
- Predrag Smiljković as Tihomir Stojković, Šojić's co-worker and cousin
- Branimir Brstina as Baćko Bojić, Šojić's godfather. Bojić is Šojić's replacement in season 6 as Milan Lane Gutović was fired from the series.
- Nenad Jezdić as Blagoje Pantić, Dimitrije Pantić's son
- Mina Lazarević as Miroslava Pantić, Dimitrije Pantić's daughter
- Ljiljana Dragutinović as Persida Pantić, Pantić's wife
- Dušan Golumbovski as Ozren Soldatović, mafia boss

== Seasons ==
- The first season was broadcast in 2006–2007 with 24 episodes.
- The second season was broadcast in 2007–2008 with 14 episodes.
- The third series premiered on January 24, 2009, and included 14 episodes.
- The fourth season premiered on January 17, 2010, and included 16 episodes.
- The fifth season premiered on February 27, 2011, and included 12 episodes.
- The sixth season premiered on January 29, 2012, and included 10 episodes.
