= Nenad Jezdić =

Serbian actor

- Ненад Јездић
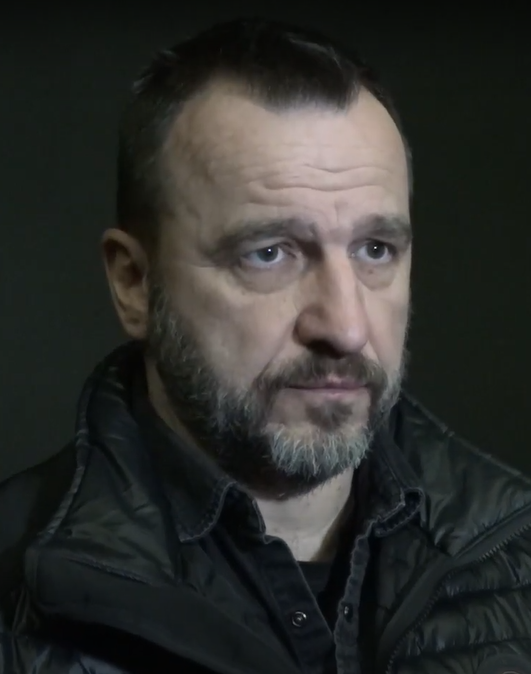
- Jezdić in 2022
- Born: 12 July 1972 (age 53); Valjevo, SFR Yugoslavia
- Education: Faculty of Dramatic Arts
- Alma mater: University of Arts in Belgrade
- Occupation: Actor
- Years active: 1993–present

Nenad Jezdić (Serbian Cyrillic: Ненад Јездић; born 12 July 1972) is a Serbian actor. He appeared in more than fifty films since 1993, such as Barking at the Stars (1998), The Dagger (1999), Frozen Stiff (2002), Black Gruya and the Stone of Wisdom (2007).

== Selected filmography ==
Year	Title	Role	Notes
1994	Ni na nebu ni na zemlji	Vlada	
1998	Tri palme za dve bitange i ribicu	Pendula	
1998	Barking at the Stars	Servuz	
1999	The Dagger		
2002	Frozen Stiff	Lemi	
2005–2006	Dollars are coming	Živorad Živanović	
2006–2012	White ship	Blagoje Pantić	
2007	Black Gruya and the Stone of Wisdom	Black Gruya	
2008	Tears for Sale		
2017	Enclave	Bus driver	
2017	Shadows over Balkan	Krojač (Tailor)	
