= Sonja Kolačarić =

Serbian actress (born 1980)

- Соња Колачapић
- Born: Sonja Kolačarić; 4 May 1980 (age 46); Lazarevac, Serbia
- Occupation: Actress
- Years active: 1999–present

Sonja Kolačarić (Serbian Cyrillic: Соња Колачapић; born 4 May 1980) is a Serbian actress. She is known for her roles in films such as Nebeska udica and Tears for Sale.

== Career ==
Sonja Kolačarić made her debut in 1999 film Sky Hook, directed by Ljubiša Samardžić and starring Nebojša Glogovac, Nikola Đuričko and Nikola Kojo. She then made cameo appearances in films The White Suit in 1999, Srbokap in 2000, and Zapečen. In 2002 Kolačarić co–starred with Nikola Đuričko in the film Mrtav 'ladan, and also appeared in film 1 na 1. After minor appearances in the films E-Snuff in 2003, Slatki miris naftalina in 2004 and Snajper in 2006, and work in theatre plays, Kolačarić appeared in a leading role in the 2008 film Tears for Sale, starring alongside Katarina Radivojević. She has also appeared on television, in the series Poslednja audijencija and in a leading role in Ono kao ljubav.

== Filmography ==
Film
Year	Title	Role
1999	Sky Hook	Seka
1999	The White Suit	Whore
2000	Srbokap	Cameo
2002	Zapečen	Cameo
2002	Frozen Stiff	Maja
2002	1 na 1	Sonja
2003	E-Snuff	Cameo
2004	Slatki miris naftalina	Cameo
2006	Snajper	Ana
2008	Tears for Sale	Ognjenka
2009	Hitna pomoć	
2009	Sunset From a Rooftop	Ivana
Television
Year	Title	Role
2008	Poslednja audijencija	Artemiza Hristić
2009—2010	Ono kao ljubav	Milica
