= Vitezović =

Vitezović (Serbian: Витезовић) is a surname. Notable people with the surname include:

- Pavao Ritter Vitezović (1652–1713), Croatian writer
- Milovan Vitezović (1944–2022), Serbian writer
