= Nebojša Ilić =

Nebojša Ilić is the name of:

- Nebojša Ilić (basketball) (born 1968), Serbian basketball executive and former player
- Nebojša Ilić (actor) (born 1973), Serbian actor
