= Sky Hook (film) =

2000 Yugoslavian film

Sky Hook (Serbian: Nebeska udica, Небеска удица) is a 2000 Yugoslavian film directed by Ljubiša Samardžić. It was the first film to receive a pan-Yugoslav release following the collapse of the former Yugoslavia. It was Yugoslavia's submission to the 73rd Academy Awards for the Academy Award for Best Foreign Language Film, but was not accepted as a nominee.

== Cast ==
- Nebojša Glogovac as Kaja
- Ana Sofrenović as Tijana
- Ivan Jevtović as Turča
- Gordan Kičić as Miša
- Katarina Žutić as Zozi
- Nikola Kojo as Zuba
- Sonja Kolačarić as Seka
- Dragan Bjelogrlić as Toza
- Irfan Mensur as Zuka
- Nikola Đuričko as Siske
- Nikola Pejaković as Lokator
- Boris Milivojević as Bolid
- Nebojša Ilić as Deki
- Neda Arnerić as Mišina Majka
- Ognjen Stanojević as Jovan

== Release ==
The film premiered at the Berlin Film Festival. In Yugoslavia it had 36,000 admissions in its first four days, grossing 1.2 million dinars and by August was the highest-grossing film in the country with a gross of over 11.9 million dinars from admissions of over 330,000.

== See also ==
- List of submissions to the 73rd Academy Awards for Best Foreign Language Film
- List of Serbian submissions for the Academy Award for Best Foreign Language Film
