= Svetlana Bojković =

Serbian actress

- Светлана Бојковић
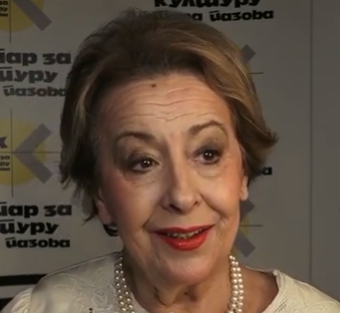
- Bojković in Stara Pazova in February 2020.
- Born: 14 December 1947 (age 78); Belgrade, PR Serbia, FPR Yugoslavia
- Education: Faculty of Dramatic Arts
- Alma mater: University of Arts in Belgrade
- Occupation: Actress
- Years active: 1967–present
- Height: 1.67 m (5 ft 6 in)
- Spouses: Miloš Žutić; Ljubomir Muci Draškić (m. 1985–2004) Slavko Kruljević (m. 2011)
- Awards: Pula Film Festival; Best Actress; 1978 The Dog Who Loved Trains; Žanka Stokić Award; 2003; Dobričin prsten 2005

Svetlana "Ceca" Bojković (Serbian Cyrillic: Светлана "Цеца" Бојковић; born 14 December 1947) is a Serbian actress.

She began her career in 1967 in the film Jednog dana moj Jamele, but her greatest movie success came ten years later with the role of Mika in the social drama The Dog Who Loved Trains. Bojković was one of the biggest Serbian TV stars during the 1990s, due to the roles she played in nationally popular TV series produced by screenwriter Siniša Pavić.

In 1978, Bojković was awarded Golden Arena for Best Actress in the Pula Film Festival for her role in the film The Dog Who Loved Trains, and in 2003 she was the first laureate of Žanka Stokić Award.

== Biography ==
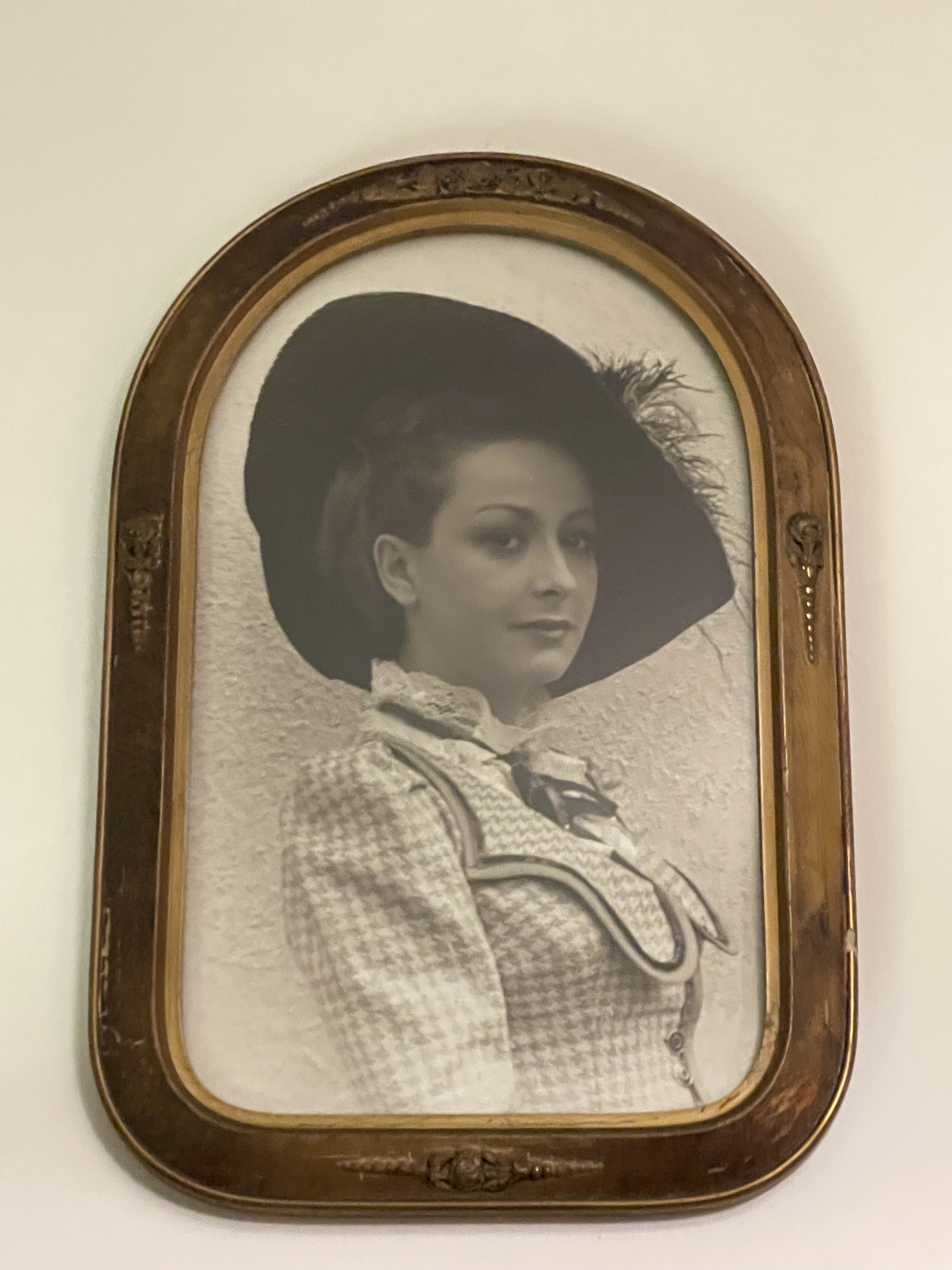
Svetlana Ceca Bojković

Bojković graduated from Belgrade's Faculty of Drama Arts in 1970, and during her career played many roles in theater, as well as in the film and on television. For the last two decades she was mostly engaged in theater Atelje 212.

== Personal ==
Svetlana Bojković has a daughter Katarina Žutić, also an actress, with actor Miloš Žutić.

Bojković married for the third time in 2011 to the diplomat Slavko Kruljević, ambassador of the Republic of Serbia to Finland and Estonia.

In 2012 she moved to Helsinki alongside her husband, and temporarily ended her active acting career.

== Filmography ==
- Јеdnog dana moj Jamele (1967)
- Pod staklenim zvonom (1967)
- Ljubitelj golubova (1968)
- Prvoklasni haos (1968)
- Ledeno ljeto (1968)
- Veličanstveni rogonja (1969)
- Оbična priča (1969)
- Preko mrtvih (1969) - Olga
- Јеdnog dana ljubav (1969)
- Тri serenade (1969)
- Кrčma na glavnom drumu (1967)
- Protekcija (1970) - Draginja
- Оmer i Merima (1970)
- Djido (movie) (1970) - Ljubica
- Rodjaci (series) (1970) - Ana
- Selo bez seljaka (1970)
- Vežbe iz gadjanja (1971)
- Čedomir Ilić (1971) - Višnja Lazarević
- Кuda idu divlje svinje (series) (1971) Vera
- Sami bez andjela (1972)
- Аfera nedužne Anabele (1972)
- Аmfitrion 38 (1972)
- Čučuk Stana (movie)(1972) - Čučuk Stana
- Izdanci iz opaljenog grma (1972)
- Nesreća (1973)
- Poslednji (1973)
- Hotel za ptice (1973)
- Naše priredbe (1973) - Stela Budičin
- Оbraz uz obraz (1973) - Ceca
- Pozorište u kući 2 (series) (1973) - Beba
- Мister dolar (movie) (1974)
- Zakletva (movie) (1974)
- Brak, sveska prva (1974)
- Dimitrije Tucović (series) (1974) - Dobroslava Djordjević
- Lepeza ledi Vindemir (1975)
- Otpisani (series) (1975) - Olivera
- Dragi, budi mi nepoznat (1975)
- Аrandjelov udes (1976)
- Izgubljena sreća (1976) - Desa
- Čast mi je pozvati vas (1976)
- The Dog Who Loved Trains - Pas koji je voleo vozove (movie) (1977) - Mika
- Јedan dan (1977)
- Žena na kamenu (1977)
- Nikola Tesla (series) (1977) - Ketrin Džonson
- Мisao (1978)
- Pučina (1978)
- Igra u dvoje (1978)
- Povratak otpisanih (series) (1978) - Stana
- Beogradska razglednica 1920 (1980)
- Pozorišna veza (1980)
- Sunce (movie) (1980)
- Crvena kraljica (1981) - Magda Mihajlović
- Neka druga žena (1981) - Danica
- Svetozar Marković (series) (1981)
- Тri sestre (1982)
- Sumrak (1983)
- Poslednje sovuljage i prvi petli (1983)
- Halo taksi (movie) (1983)
- Ljetovanje na jugu (1983)
- X+Y=0 (1983) - Mrs Y
- Priče iz fabrike (1983) - Svjetlana Pašić
- Neozbiljni Branislav Nušić (1986)
- Bolji život (series) (1987-1988) - Еmilija Popadić
- Bolji život (movie) (1989) - Emilija Popadić
- Gala korisnica: Аtelje 212 kroz vekove (1990)
- Ljubav je hleb sa devet kora (1990)
- Smrt gospodje ministarke (TV drama) (1990) - Žanka Stokić
- Коnak (1990)
- Bolji život 2 (series) (1990-1991) - Еmilija Popadić
- Policajac sa Petlovog brda (movie) (1992) - Radmila
- Policajac sa Petlovog brda (series) (1993) - Radmila
- Srećni ljudi (series) (1993-1994) - Antonija Miloradović
- Vukovar, jedna priča (movie) (1994) - Vilma
- Policajac sa Petlovog brda (series) (1994) - Radmila
- Јој, Кarmela (1996) - Karmela
- Filumena Marturano (1996) - Filumena Marturano
- Srećni ljudi 2 (series) (1996) - Antonija Miloradović
- Ptice koje ne polete (1997)
- Lagum (1997) - Milica Pavlović
- Porodično blago (series) (1998-2001) - Valerija Gavrilović
- Proputovanje (1999)
- Budi fin (2001)
- Porodično blago 2 (series) (2001-2002) - Valerija Gavrilović
- Zona Zamfirova (2002) - Jevda
- Мansarda (2003) (series) - Кrunoslava Hadžiantić „Кruna“
- M(j)ešoviti brak (series) (2003) - Andjelija Stanivuk
- Šejtanov ratnik (movie) (2006) - Latinka
- Bela lađa (series) (2006-2007) - Jasmina Pantelić
- Pozorište u kući (2007) - Аna Šumović
- Bela lađa 2 (series) (2008) - Jasmina Pantelić
- Gorki plodovi (series) (2008) . Ruža
- Ulica lipa (series) (2007-2008) - Duda
- Мansarda 2 (2009) (series) - Кrunoslava Hadžiantić „Кruna“
- Оno kao ljubav (series) (2010) - Svetlana
- Lud, zbunjen, normalan (series) (2010) - Laura
- Neke druge priče (movie) (2010) - Mother
- Selo gori, a baba se češlja (series) (2011) - Doctor Boba
- Мali ljubavni bog (movie) (2011) - Marija
- Junaci našeg doba (series) (2019) - Marija Lazović
