= Frozen Stiff =

2002 Yugoslavian comedy film

- Directed by: Milorad Milinković
- Starring: Srđan Todorović; Nenad Jezdić Milorad Mandic
- Release date: 15 March 2002
- Running time: 104 minutes
- Country: FR Yugoslavia
- Language: Serbian

Frozen Stiff (Serbian: Mrtav 'ladan, Мртав 'ладан) is a 2002 Yugoslav comedy film directed by Milorad Milinković. The film is about two brothers trying to transport their dead grandfather to his hometown, but lose him in the process and try to find him back before the funeral.

== Cast ==
- Srđan Todorović - Kiza
- Nenad Jezdić - Lemi
- Nikola Đuričko - Limeni
- Sonja Kolačarić - Maja
- Bata Paskaljević - Grandfather
- Tara Manic - Ana
