= Žanka Stokić award =

The Žanka Stokić (Serbian Cyrillic: Жанка Стокић) is the distinguished award for acting in Serbian theater. It is awarded only to actresses.

History of the award begins in 2001 when famous Serbian actress Mira Stupica (1923-2016) celebrated her 60-years of acting. On the stage, she publicly called for establishing the Velika Žanka award (Great Žanka), in honor of Žanka Stokić (1887-1947), today generally considered the best theatrical Serbian actress ever. Ill-fated Žanka, once the most celebrated Serbian actress was jailed and condemned (nearly being executed in the process) by the Communist regime in the post-war Yugoslavia as a collaborator during World War II, simply because she was performing during the war years.

Mira Stupica and her husband, famous Slovenian-Yugoslav theatrical director and theater manager Bojan Stupica were great admirers of Žanka Stokić, and Bojan Stupica managed to convince new authorities to let her act again, but she died before she returned to the stage. Also, Mira Stupica pointed out that there are no appropriate awards for actresses in their prime, when they are too old for the debutant awards and still too young for the life-time awards.

In 2002 it was announced that new annual award will be established next year, under the name of Žanka Stokić award. Stupica was the president for life of the award jury. In 2020, it was announced that the award will become biennial, initially for the 2020–2021 period.

== Laureates ==
Laureates:

- 2003: Svetlana Bojković (1947)
- 2004: Milena Dravić (1940-2018)
- 2005: Radmila Živković (1952)
- 2006: Đurđija Cvetić (1942-2015)
- 2007: Ružica Sokić (1934-2013)
- 2008: Seka Sablić (1942)
- 2009: Gordana Đurđević-Dimić (1961)
- 2010: Dara Džokić (1955)
- 2011: Mirjana Karanović (1957)
- 2012: Ljiljana Blagojević (1955)
- 2013: Ljiljana Stjepanović (1952)
- 2014: Mira Banjac (1929)
- 2015: Anita Mančić (1968)
- 2016: Jasna Đuričić (1966)
- 2017: Olga Odanović (1958)
- 2018: Nataša Ninković (1972)
- 2019: Gorica Popović (1952)
- 2021: Tanja Bošković (1953)
