= Zona Zamfirova =

2002 Yugoslavian comedy-drama film

- Directed by: Zdravko Šotra
- Written by: Zdravko Šotra
- Based on: Zona Zamfirova by Stevan Sremac
- Produced by: Miroslav Mitić
- Starring: Vojin Ćetković; Katarina Radivojević; Dragan Nikolić; Milena Dravić; Radmila Živković; Svetlana Bojkovic
- Music by: Nenad Milosavljević; Bilja Krstić
- Release date: 2002
- Running time: 104 min
- Country: FR Yugoslavia
- Language: Serbian
- Budget: $1.200.000,00
- Box office: $21.000.000,00

Zona Zamfirova (Serbian Cyrillic: Зона Замфирова) is a 2002 comedy-drama film directed by Zdravko Šotra, produced by Miroslav Mitić. It is based on the 1906 book by Serbian author Stevan Sremac. The film contains the local vernacular of the Serbian dialect spoken in the region of Niš.

According to data from 2018, it is the most watched Serbian film ever, having been seen by a total of 1.2 million people in theatre release in Serbia.

The house used for the set of Zona's house is located in Pirot, and was built in 1848 by the wealthy merchant Hrista Jovanović.

A sequel, Vrati se Zone, was released on January 24, 2017.

== Plot ==
Zona Zamfirova is set in the Serbian city of Niš in the 19th century. The plot follows the story of Zona Zamfirova (Katarina Radivojević), a local rich man's daughter, and the vicissitudes of her affair with Mane (Vojin Ćetković), an ordinary goldsmith. As it was undesirable for the daughter of a rich man to marry a craftsman, the two are at first divided, with the possibility of Zona marrying Manulać, who comes from a wealthy family. Everything is, however, changed as Mane organizes a successful conspiracy to keep Zona for himself.

== Cast ==
- Vojin Ćetković - Mane Kujundžija
- Katarina Radivojević - Zona Zamfirova
- Dragan Nikolić - Hadži Zamfir
- Milena Dravić - Tašana
- Radmila Živković - Doka
- Nikola Đuričko - Perica
- Sloboda Mićalović - Vaska
- Nebojša Ilić - Manulać
- Branimir Brstina - Jordan
- Danica Maksimović - Persa
- Ružica Sokić - Taska
- Jelica Sretenovic - Kaliopa
- Svetlana Bojković - Jevda
- Ana Franić - Vasilija
