= Olivera Katarina =

Serbian actress (1940–2026)

Olivera Katarina Оливера Катарина

Background information
- Also known as: Olivera Vučo; Olivera Šakić
- Born: Olivera Petrović; 5 March 1940; Belgrade, Kingdom of Yugoslavia
- Died: 21 July 2026 (aged 86)
- Genres: Serbian traditional; folk; chanson; Romani music; pop
- Occupations: Actress; singer; writer
- Years active: 1964–2026
- Labels: PGP-RTB; PGP-RTS; Jugoton; Supraphon
- Website: oliverakatarina.weebly.com

Olivera Katarina (née Petrović; Serbian Cyrillic: Оливера Катарина, née Петровић; 5 March 1940 – 21 July 2026), also previously known as Olivera Vučo (Serbian Cyrillic: Оливера Вучо) and Olivera Šakić (Serbian Cyrillic: Оливера Шакић), was a Serbian actress, singer and writer. She was one of the leading stars of Yugoslav cinema in the 1960s and the 1970s, and was probably the best known for her performance in Aleksandar Petrović's film I Even Met Happy Gypsies (1967), which won the Grand Prix at the 1967 Cannes Film Festival.

As a singer, Katarina performed music of various genres, varying from Serbian traditional to pop music, and in numerous languages.

== Early life ==
Olivera Katarina was born Olivera Petrović to father Budimir, a naval captain, and mother Katarina (née Jovančić) on 5 March 1940 in Belgrade, Kingdom of Yugoslavia. She adopted Olivera Katarina in 1969 to honor her mother, who had died on 4 January 1969. She spent her childhood in Belgrade, Dobanovci and Valjevo.

As a child, Olivera Katarina attended piano and ballet lessons. In 1959, she went to Paris and enrolled the Alliance Française school in order to improve her French language skills. Olivera Katarina initially enrolled the University of Belgrade Faculty of Law before switching to the Faculty of Dramatic Arts. Among her mates at the Faculty of Dramatic Arts were Milena Dravić and Petar Kralj.

== Career ==
Katarina studied at the academy for theater, film, radio and television in Belgrade. Started her career as a student with a major role as Koštana in a same name play in a National Theater in Belgrade. There she met Vuk Vučo, a theater critic whom she later married.

For a role in Goya or the Hard Way to Enlightenment in 1971 (as Olivera Katarina), she was awarded at festivals in Moscow and Venice. Her major success was in Aleksandar Petrović's I Even Met Happy Gypsies, where she played a gipsy singer named Lenče. Film was nominated for the Best Foreign Language Film at the 40th Academy Awards, for a Palme d'Or at the 1967 Cannes Film Festival, and for Best Foreign-Language film at the 26th Golden Globe Awards. It won the FIPRESCI Grand Prize of the Jury at the 1967 Cannes Film Festival. Olivera closed this festival with a concert together with Nana Mouskouri and Dionne Warwick.

She also had a very prominent singing career. She recorded in Serbian language, as well as in Russian, Japanese, Romanian, Greek, Romani, and Indonesian. She sang traditional Serbian folk songs and Gypsy/Romani songs. In famous Paris Olympia she held 72 consecutive concerts.

In 1969, she participated in the national choice to represent Yugoslavia in the Eurovision Song Contest 1969 with the song "Poigraj, poigraj, devojče".

Katarina is also known as "the only woman Salvador Dalí knelt in front of", being amazed by her beauty and voice, after her concert in Paris.

In 2007, Katarina contributed songs for Marina Abramović's Balkan Erotic Epic, and portrays a goddess in Uroš Stojanović's film Čarlston za Ognjenku.

== Personal life and death ==
In her early youth Olivera Katarina dated water polo goalkeeper Milan Muškatirović for several years during the late 1950s.

During her time at the film academy she met journalist Vuk Vučo and quickly married him. The marriage lasted only a year and a half.

Katarina then for seven years lived in a common-law relationship with the powerful Yugoslav Security Service (UDBA) operative and Avala Film chairman Ratko Dražević.

In 1970, Olivera Katarina married Miladin Šakić, an administrator who later became the president of the Red Star Belgrade football club, with then Mayor of Belgrade Branko Pešić as Šakić's best man. The couple's only son Mane, a painter based in Madrid, was born on 1 February 1971. Later in 1971, Šakić sustained serious injuries in a car crash near Mladenovac which left him paralyzed until his death in 1987. In an interview for the Blic daily in 2011, Olivera Katarina claimed she had not been in a relationship with a man after Šakić.

Katarina died on 21 July 2026, at the age of 86.

== Filmography ==
Title	Year	Role	Notes
Dobra kob	1964	Keti	
Belo u belom	1964	Unknown	Television film
One i on	1964	Unknown	Television film
Put oko sveta	1964	Rebeka	
Akcija inspektora Rukavine	1965	Unknown	Television film
Sigurno je sigurno	1965	Unknown	Television film
Ponoćni gost	1965	Unknown	Television film
Roj	1966	Ljubica	
Monday or Tuesday; Ponedeljak ili utorak	1966	Marko's lover	
Kiss Kiss, Kill Kill; Kommissar X – Jagd auf Unbekannt	1966	Bobo	
The Dream; San	1966	Girl	
I Even Met Happy Gypsies; Skupljači perja	1967	Lenče	
Mountain of Wrath; Planina gneva	1968	Olivera	
Ima ljubavi, nema ljubavi	1968	Unknown	
Comandamenti per un gangster	1968	Unknown	
Do Not Mention the Cause of Death; Uzrok smrti ne pominjati	1968	Marija	
Fräulein Doktor	1968	Marchioness de Haro	
Wien nach Noten	1969	Unknown	Television film
The Soldier; Vojnik	1970	Milanka	Filmed in 1966
Mark of the Devil; Hexen bis aufs Blut gequält	1970	Vanessa Benedikt	
Ann and Eve; Ann och Eve – de erotiska	1970	Singer	
A Big Grey-Blue Bird; Ein großer graublauer Vogel	1971	Diana	
Goya or the Hard Way to Enlightenment; Goya – oder Der arge Weg der Erkenntnis	1971	The Duchess of Alba	
Devičanska svirka	1973	Sibila	Television film
Polen Dust; Polenov prah	1974	Unknown	
The Dervish and Death; Derviš i smrt	1974	Kadinica	
Hell River; Partizani	1974	Mila	Also known as Tactical Guerrilla
Hell River; Partizani	1974	Mila	TV miniseries adapted from the film
Crveni udar	1974	Ana	
Zarudela zora na Moravi	1978	Woman	Television short film
Sedam plus sedam	1979	Olivera	Television series
Jelena Gavanski	1982	Lina	Television film
Vuk Karadžić	1987	Eustahija Radovanović	TV series
Tears for Sale; Čarlston za Ognjenku	2008	Velika Boginja	

== Discography ==
=== Studio albums ===
- Olivera Katarina (1974)
- Alaj mi je večeras po volji (1974)
- O. K. (U ime ljubavi) (1976)
- Ciganske pesme (1977)
- Osvetnica (1979)
- Zarudela zora na Moravi (1980)
- Idu momci u vojnike (1982)
- Retka zverka (1984)
- Romanija/Pleme moje... (1999)
- Tajna (2009)

=== Compilation albums ===
- Alaj mi je večeras po volji – Najlepše pesme (1999)

=== Singles ===
- "Nije to, ljudi, istina" / "Šošana" / "'Ajde da igramo" / "Ne dam, ne dam" (1966)
- "Ja ništa ne znam" / "Bosonoga Sendi (Marioneta)" / "Moj je ceo svet (Uno Tranquillo)" / "A Man and a Woman Theme Song" (1967)
- "Neću tebe (Doksa to teo)" / "Suliram" / "Svu noć je padao sneg" / "Jer ljubav to je miris belog cveća" (1967)
- "Đelem, đelem" / "Rino" / "Trajo, trajo" / "Bida" / "Niška Banja" / "Čerde Mile" (1967)
- "Balade" (1968)
- "Poigraj, poigraj, devojče" (1969)
- "Himna čoveku" (1969)
- "Šu, šu" / "Tula" / "Baš sam srećna ja (La felicidad)" / "Eri (Irene Erini)" (1969)
- "Ža, ža" / "Lidu, lidu" / "Verka kaluđerka" / "Kaljina, maljina" (1969)
- "To je naše more, to su naše gore..." (1971)
- "Vatra" / "Ljubav" (1971)
- "Budi moj" / "Imam nešto da ti dam" (1971)
- "Tam deka ima" / "Dimitrijo" (1971)
- "Treperi jedno veče" / "Htela bih da znam" (1972)
- "Wakamono ha kaeranakatta" / "Koi ha..." (1973)
- "Alba" / "Plovi lađa Dunavom" (1973)
- "Ne dodiruj moje lice" / "Ne reci nikom" (1974)
- "Pričaj mi o ljubavi" / "Pada noć" (1974)
- "Alaj mi je večeras po volji" / "Kamerav" / "Čep, čep u slavinu" / "Verka kaluđerka" (1975)
- "Žena" / "Sada i nikada više" (1975)
- "Sanjam" / "Bilo je tako lepo sve" (1976)
- "Crvena jabuka" / "Sijerinska banja" (1977)
- "Nikad ne zaboravi dane naše ljubavi" / "Slatke male laži" (1979)

== Bibliography ==
- Beli badnjaci (White Yules)
- Aristokratsko stopalo (Aristocratic Foot)
