= Old House, Pirot =

Old House
- Stara kuća - Hristin konak (Serbian)
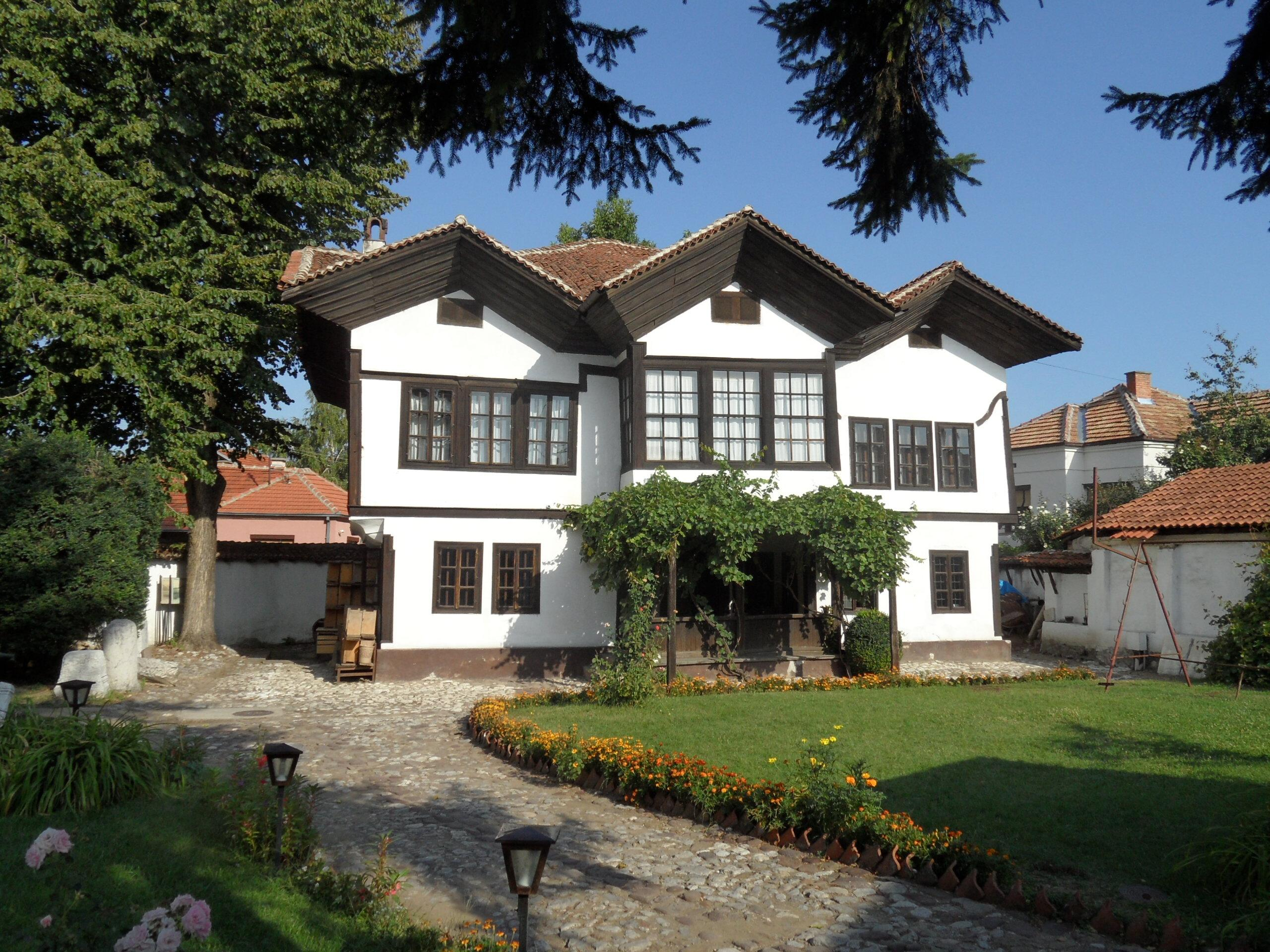
- Interactive map of Old House
- 43°9′42.8345″N 22°35′19.023″E
- Location: Museum Old House, Nikole Pašića 49, 18300 Pirot, Serbia

History
- Built: 1848

Cultural Heritage of Serbia
- Type: Cultural Monument of Exceptional Importance
- Reference no.: SK 295

The Old House is a Hristic family house in Tijabara, Pirot. Built in 1848 for merchant Hrista Jovanović, it has been the property of the Serbian state since 1953, and in 1979 it became a Monument of Culture of Exceptional Importance for Serbia. After WWII, the Old House became a museum, opening to the public in 1956. It is Pirot's best preserved example of traditional architecture from the mid-19th century.

== History ==
Construction took two years and was completed on April 5, 1848, according to a plaque on the building's ground floor. It is one of Pirot's most luxurious mid-nineteenth century Christian houses. Due to the building's size and multiple stories, Jovanović needed permission from the Turkish authorities to construct it, resulting in its location on the outskirts of the town.

No information remains about the craftsmen who built the house. It remains unclear whether Jovanović had it designed by an architect, or dreamed it himself up while traveling through the Ottoman Empire for trade purposes.

Hrista Jovanović occupied the house, and it was inherited by his descendants, whose surname changed from Jovanović to Hristić. After World War II, the building was turned into a museum by the municipality of Pirot.

== Construction and layout ==
The building is crowned by a unique, gazebo-style roof. Wooden window frames and decorated lathes on the building's corners add features to its bright white facade. Through the porch is the hall, which features a fireplace and storage for flour and wood. This room is flanked by two bedrooms. A wooden staircase leads to the spacious upstairs living room, which is divided into:

- A central section with shelves and a fireplace
- The "divanhana" (men's room)
- The women's room

Various uniquely-named rooms lead off the hall: the bedroom, the Kandil (Thurible) Room, the Great Room, the Treasury, and the Sar'k Room.

While the ground floor was used on a daily basis by the house's residents, the upstairs was reserved for prominent guests. A staircase leads up from the second floor to a viewing platform on the roof. The roof's wide eaves are lined with shingle and form a wreath of archivolts over the windows at the front and sides of the house. This unique roof design is unusual even in the Balkans.

There are several engraved cabinets in the house. The best work is on the ground floor and is attributed to a craftsman of the famous Debar school. The ceiling of the divanhana is also engraved, while the Great Room features a plaster stucco ceiling. Typical of Serbian architecture of this period, the house also features a secret passage and a unique "Kandil" (thurible) Room. The secret passage was accessed from behind the downstairs cabinet and led to the house's rear entrance under the staircase. In the Kandil room, an iconostasis adorned the eastern wall, and a thurible would be burnt during religious holidays.

== Trivia ==
=== Movies ===
A large part of "Zona Zamfirova" was filmed in the Old House, which was the setting for Hadzi Zamfir's residence. "Ivkova slava," another cult Serbian movie, was also filmed almost entirely in the house's grounds and interior.

=== Hrista Jovanović / Little Rista ===
Hrista Jovanović, better known as Čučuk Rista or Mali Rasta (Little Rista), was a prominent merchant in Pirot and the Ottoman Empire. He originally lived in the Zavoj village, which had been submerged under a lake in the second half of the 19th century. He later settled near Pirot, in 1830. Rista was not originally a merchant, taking up that occupation at the time he moved to Pirot.

Jovanović quickly achieved success as a merchant, and after the suggestions of Çorbacı and Turkish authorities from Pirot, in 1840, he became a Kalauz (cow and butter tax collector) for the pasha of Vidin. He briefly worked for pasha Usein in the Pirot district, and became independent not long after.

Jovanović amassed a great deal of wealth from trade with the Ottoman Empire. He traveled to Niš, Leskovac, Vidin, Sofia, and Carigrad to sell his goods. He had a reputation for greed, and he was expelled from Pirot by pasha Sadrezam for repeatedly selling the same goods to the Turkish army.

==== Little Rista's room ====
In Pirot, Serbs were forced to obey the Turkish authorities. Dissatisfied, Jovanović decided to force Turkish authorities to submit to him. As he was very short, Jovanović purposefully built a room with a very low ceiling. The Turkish authorities, who were relatively tall, were forced to bend down to enter the room. When the authorities questioned him about it, Jovanović avoided arrest by stating: "I am a short man, so my room is smaller. It was made only for me." Thus, he made the Turkish authorities bow to him, which was unthinkable at the time.

== See also ==
- Monument of Culture of Exceptional Importance
- Tourism in Serbia
- List of museums in Serbia
