= Sanja Bestic =

Serbian-American director, writer and producer

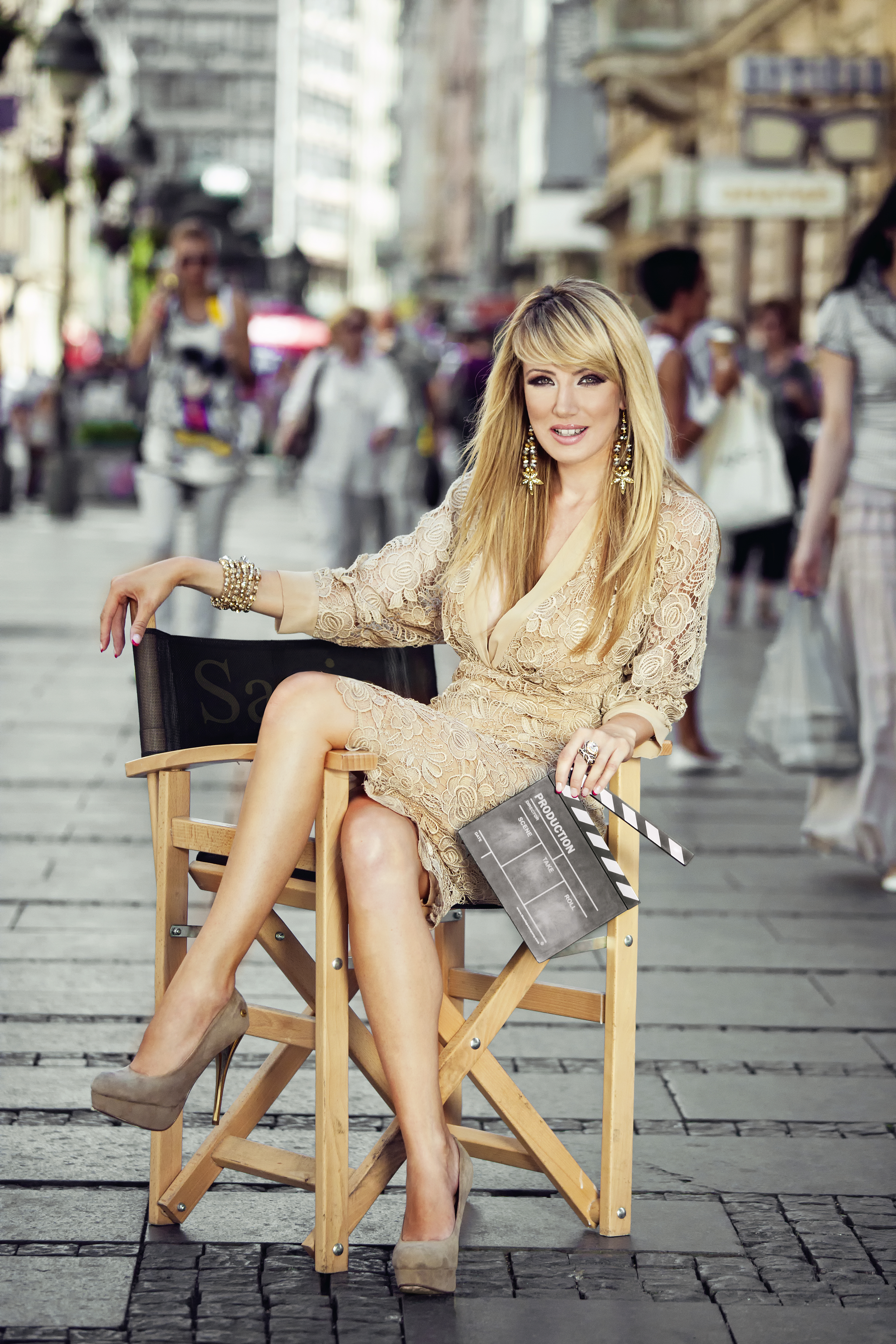
- Born: June 13, 1982 (age 43); Belgrade, Yugoslavia
- Occupations: Director, Producer
- Years active: 2000–present
- Known for: Tesla, Jackie and Marilyn
- Spouse: Vladimir Berisavac
- Children: 2 (Iva and Asja)

Sanja Bestic (Serbian: Сања Бeштић, Sanja Beštić; born June 13, 1982) is a Serbian-American director, writer and producer.

== Early life ==
Sanja was born in Zemun, Belgrade, Serbia to mother Biljana Gajić Beštić, an artist, and father Branislav Beštić, a soccer player from Belgrade, Yugoslavia (present day Serbia). Her younger brother, Vladimir Beštić, is a former Serbian football player who has since become the head coach at a prestigious football academy in New York City, USA.

Sanja attended Zemun High School (Zemunska Gimnazija) while simultaneously studying at the renowned theater studio and acting school under the direction of the highly respected theater professor, Mika Aleksić. She pursued theater directing at the Faculty of Dramatic Arts at University of Arts in Belgrade under the guidance of Ivana Vujić. While attending a fellowship at the Moving Academy for Performing Arts in Amsterdam, she refined her artistic coaching skills. Sanja worked with the Theater of Shadows and, after moving to New York City in 2004, further expanded her studies at The Michael Chekhov Acting Studio and the Lee Strasberg Theatre and Film Institute.

== Personal life ==
In 2016, Bestic married her long-time partner Vladimir Berisavac, a lawyer working as a consultant for The World Bank. They have two daughters – Iva, who was born in 2017, and Asja, born in 2018.

Serbian actor Slobodan Beštić is Sanja's uncle.

She studied in the same class with Jana Milić, Viktor Savić and Borka Tomović.

In her career she worked with a lot of Serbian artists, such as Katarina Radivojević, Jana Milić, Sergej Trifunović, Aleksandra Kovač, Marčelo, Luka Mijatović, Ana Milenković, Lejla Hot, Ana Bebić, Sara Jo, Nevena Božović, Verica Rakocević, Veljko Kuzmančević, Nebojša Babić, Miša Obradović.

== Career ==
While still a student, to propel her career, Sanja worked as assistant director to many well known directors of the former Yugoslavia and Serbia. She has worked with: Dušan Jovanović, Ljubiša Ristić, Slobodan Umnkovski, Aleksandar Popovski, Filip Gajić, Gorčin Stojanović, Egon Savin, Ivana Vujić and Jug Radivojević. Her work as a student also included productions with the Association of Non-Verbal Theaters in Belgrade, Serbia. She was a member of the Svan Theater (the only non-verbal theater where performances were set to music) where she performed and directed one of her plays, Play Against Violence, showcasing the life and emotions of Serbian people during the Belgrade bombings in 1999.

Sanja's first US premiere was in 2004, when Canary Soup by Miloš Radović was performed at The Kraine Theater (an off-Broadway theater located in New York City's East Village) featuring renowned Serbian actor Sergej Trifunović in his NYC debut, as well as Natalie Rodić. Her focus on Balkan classics and modern dramas allowed her to introduce Eastern European writers to the American audience. In a 2010 interview, Sanja stated that "The Weeping Game is a timeless classic Serbian piece" which she wished to introduce to American audiences. Additionally, Sanja has also directed American classics and modern dramas, such as Sidetracked (her fifth Off-Broadway play) by John Pastore at the Abingdon Theater in 2011, The Tiger by Murray Schisgal and Want & Need by John Krisiukenas at Payan Theater in New York City in 2012.

She has produced and directed a number of off-Broadway shows, including Therapy by Jordan Cvetanovic, produced by KinoKamera Inc. Sanja has also directed Touch my Knees by David Albahari, The Government Inspector by Nikolai V. Gogol, Two Fools in Love by Duško Radović, and Painkillers by Neda Radulovic, The Doll by (Miro Gavran, Storefront + BenchProductions, The Local Theater NYC 2012 ), and All About Women (Miro Gavran, Storefront + BenchProductions, The Local Theater, NYC 2012).

In May, 2013 she wrapped up Tesla, written by British award-winning playwright Sheri Graubert and produced by Entertainers UK, formerly EasyTheaters Productions based in London. Tesla premiered in May, 2013 in New York City, telling a story about one of the most respected Serbian-American scientists in the world. The play moved to London's West End. This project was highly supported by The Tesla Science Foundation and Office for Cooperation with Diaspora and Serbs in the Region.

Aside from theater, Sanja has also worked in advertising, directed television commercials and short films. Her work has included TV commercials for Henkel (German), Société Générale (French), and Vegeta (Podravka) (Croatia). Additionally, she has worked for Iteam Events and Skymusic Production (Skymusic Corporation), international marketing and event-planning agencies, where she directed and produced stage and corporate events, festivals and concerts at various theaters, ballrooms, and other venues. She is also actively involved in humanitarian work. Sanja is an Executive Producer at Digital Mind.

Sanja entered into an exclusive partnership with the media company KinoKamera Inc in 2009 and Storefront + Bench in 2011 as their sole theater director. In 2010, Sanja co-founded The Local Theater NYC, a non-profit, multicultural, interdisciplinary art gallery committed to the research, production, presentation, and interpretation of contemporary art. In 2012, Sanja started Art Fusion Project (AFP) in Belgrade, Serbia, which is an international multimedia art movement.

The AFP's mission is to support creativity through education, management, and exposure for artists on a global level.

Sanja is the associate producer for the web series Catch-30. Bestic did an Off-Broadway play titled Jackie and Marilyn in the spring of 2014 at Theatre Row (New York City) with Lorraine Farris Sage as Jackie Kennedy and Lella Satie as Marilyn Monroe.

In 2018, Sanja joined VR All Art AG, a company based in Switzerland, as a Strategy Director. VR All Art AG was founded by Vitomir Jevremović and Alexander Fürer in 2017.

== Awards ==
In 2013, Sanja Bestic was nominated and won an award by the Tesla Science Foundation, a result of her great efforts to promote the life and work of scientist Nikola Tesla through her theater and film project Tesla.

== Theater productions ==
List of theater productions by Sanja Beštić
Title	Author	Theater	Year
Jackie and Marilyn	Sheri Graubert	The Lion Theatre, NYC	2014
Tesla	Sheri Graubert	Theatre 80, NYC	2013
The Tiger	Murray Schisgal	Abingdon Theatre, NYC	2012
Want & Need	John Krisiukenas	Payan Theater, NYC	2012
The Doll	Miro Gavran	The Local Theatre, NYC	2012
All About Women	Miro Gavran	The Local Theatre, NYC	2012
Sidetracked	John Pastore	Abingdon Theatre, NYC	2011
Therapy	Jordan Cvetanovic	Chopin Theatre, Chicago IL	2011
The Weeping Game	Ben Akiba aka Branislav Nusic	The Local Theatre, NYC	2010
Painkillers	Neda Radulovic	The Lion Theatre, NYC	2009
Two Fools in Love	Duško Radović	Mata Milošević Theater, Belgrade	2006
Canary Soup	Milos Radovic	Kraine Theatre, NYC	2004
