= Nebojša Ilić (actor) =

Serbian actor

- Небојша Илић
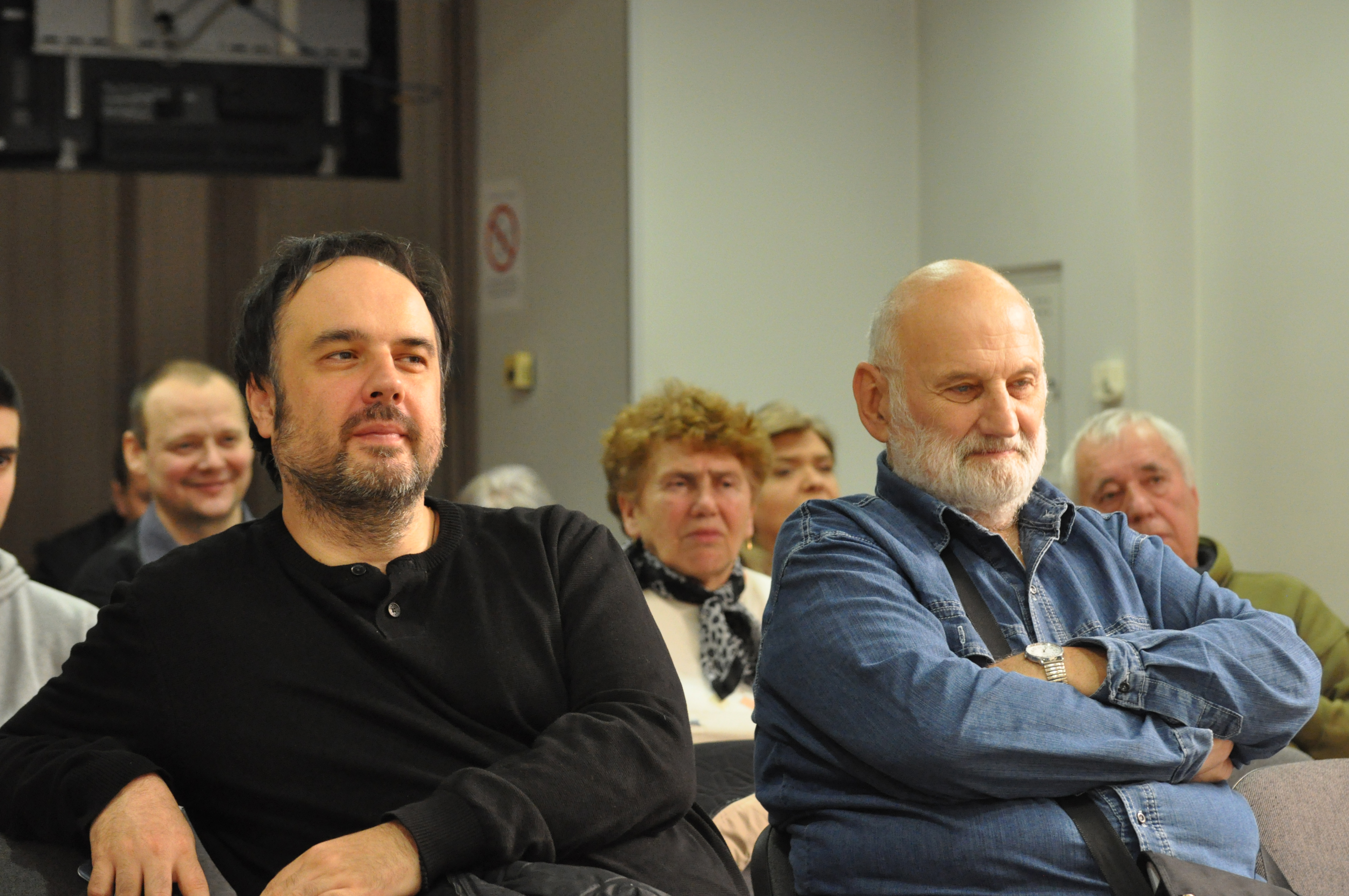
- Ilić (left) with Zoran Simjanović.
- Born: 25 June 1973 (age 52); Belgrade, SFR Yugoslavia
- Other name: Cile
- Occupation: Actor
- Years active: 1996–present

Nebojša "Cile" Ilić (Serbian Cyrillic: Небојша Илић; born 25 June 1973) is a Serbian actor. He appeared in more than forty films since 1996.

== Filmography ==
=== Film ===
Year	Title	Role	Notes
1996	Pretty Village, Pretty Flame	Velja's brother	
1998	Barking at the Stars	Bogoljub Marić	
2000	Sky Hook	Deki	
2002	Zona Zamfirova	Manulać	
2007	Klopka	Smiling bank clerk	
2007	Black Gruya and the Stone of Wisdom	Mladen	
2010	Montevideo, God Bless You!	Boško Simonović	
2014	See You in Montevideo	Boško Simonović	
2016	Herd	Bailiff	
2016	Santa Maria della Salute	Milan Savić	

=== Television ===
Year	Title	Role	Notes
2006–2012	White ship	Miroslav Stanković	
2015–2018	Neighbours	Ivan Zdravković	
2021	Alexander of Yugoslavia	Stjepan Radić	
