= Branka Pujić =

Serbian actress and drama teacher (born 1963)

- Бранка Пујић
- Born: 6 November 1963 (age 62); Belgrade, SR Serbia, SFR Yugoslavia
- Other name: Branka Pujić Jovanović
- Education: Faculty of Dramatic Arts
- Occupations: Actress; drama teacher
- Years active: 1988–present
- Employer(s): Faculty of Dramatic Arts, University of Arts in Belgrade
- Spouse: Dragan Jovanović (m. 1992)
- Children: 1
- Relatives: Petar Benčina, Igor Benčina (cousins)

Branka Pujić (Serbian: Бранка Пујић; born 6 November 1963), also known as Branka Pujić Jovanović, is a Serbian actress and drama teacher. She is a full professor of stage movement at the Faculty of Dramatic Arts (FDU) in Belgrade. Her television roles include Policajac sa Petlovog brda, Stižu dolari and Ranjeni orao.

== Early life and education ==
Pujić was born in Belgrade. She studied psychology at the Faculty of Philosophy for two years before enrolling in acting at the Faculty of Dramatic Arts, where she graduated in 1991 in the class of Professor Vladimir Jevtović. She later earned a master's degree in theatre studies and completed professional training in France, Budapest, Prague and Buenos Aires.

== Career ==
=== Acting ===
At the Yugoslav Drama Theatre she appeared in productions including Baal, Na letovanju and Nižinski. She made her film debut in 1988 and has since appeared in more than 25 films and a number of television series. She has also worked in radio drama, for which she received the Vitomir Bogić Award, and she has been recognised at comedy festivals.

=== Teaching ===
Pujić has taught at FDU since 1996. She was elected assistant professor in 2003 and associate professor in 2011, and is now a full professor in the Department of Acting, where she teaches stage movement. With her cousin Igor Benčina she runs the Mali teatar acting school in Zemun. In 2026 she chaired the student film jury at the Herceg Novi Film Festival.

== Anti-corruption protests ==
During the 2024–present Serbian anti-corruption protests, Pujić took part in the blockades in Belgrade in 2025, together with her husband, actor Dragan Jovanović. The couple regularly attended the protests in Zemun, where they sang with the demonstrators. In September 2026 she accompanied Jovanović in Zemun while citizens queued to sign in support of the Student List, on which he is a candidate.

== Awards ==
- Vitomir Bogić Award for radio drama
- Golden Badge of the Cultural and Educational Community of Serbia
- Plaque of an Honorary Citizen of Zemun

== Personal life ==
Pujić is married to actor Dragan Jovanović. Their daughter, Anđela, is also an actress. Actors Petar and Igor Benčina are her cousins.

== Filmography ==
=== Film ===
Year	Title	Role	Notes
1988	Dečji bič	Vida	
1988	Sentimentalna priča	Marijana	
1988	Vanbračna putovanja	Anabela	
1988	Braća po materi	Czechoslovakian tourist	
1989	Najbolji	Mejra	
1990	Sveto mesto	Katarina	
1990	Pod žrvnjem	Stana Savić	
1991	Bračna putovanja	Anabela	
1991	Brod plovi za Šangaj	Margita	
1992	Koju igru igraš	Anabela	
1992	Zagreb-Beograd preko Sarajeva	Dame	
1992	Prokleta je Amerika		Segment "Ruža's revenge"
1994	Biće bolje	Lola	
1994	Dva sata kvalitetnog programa	Maca	
1994	Ni na nebu ni na zemlji	Zoki	
1995	Svadbeni marš	Jelena Mitrović	
1997	Tango je tužna misao koja se pleše	Marjuska	
2000	Senke uspomena	Miloš's wife	
2001	Moja porodica, privatizacija i ja	Natalija	
2002	Breg čežnje	Vera	
2003	Taksista	Divna	
2007	Božićna pečenica	Katja Maksić	
2007	Dva	Woman on the bench	
2008	The Brothers Bloom	Foster mom	
2010	Ma nije on takav	Margita	
2010	Montevideo, God Bless You!	Ružica	
2010	Najmiliji		

=== Television ===
Year	Title	Role	Notes
1993–1994	Policajac sa Petlovog brda	Irena Soldatović	
2003	Neki novi klinci	Miss Piggy	
2004–2006	Stižu dolari	Jelena Ljutić	
2007	Pozorište u kući	Mrs. Marković	
2008	Vratiće se rode		
2008	Zaboravljeni umovi Srbije	Marija	
2008	Zaustavi vreme	Marija; Marijana	
2008	Ranjeni orao	Zora Bogdanović	2008–2009
2009	Zauvijek mlad	Assemblyman's wife	
2010	Greh njene majke		
2010	Totalno novi talas	Goca	
2011–2013	Ruža vjetrova	Suzana Matošić	
