= Čučuk Stana =

Serbian historical figure

Čučuk Stana (Serbian Cyrillic: Чучук Стана, "Little Stana") was a Serbian female hajduk, the second wife of Hajduk Veljko and later married the Greek fighter Giorgakis Olympios. She is also a character in Serb epic poetry.

== Biography ==
She was born in 1795, in the village Sikole near Negotin, Serbia to a family of Herzegovinian migrants. She had two sisters, Stojna and Stamena and later, a much younger brother Mihailo. Before the brother grew up, being three sisters, they all wore men's clothes out of the house, because they had no adult brother to protect them. She got her nickname "Čučuk" (from Turkish küçük = small) due to her short stature. She finished school in Bela Crkva.

She met Hajduk Veljko in 1812. The two of them lived together even though he still had another, married wife, as divorce was virtually impossible to obtain at the time in an Orthodox country in serious upheaval, that Serbia was during the Serbian Revolution. Veljko was killed in 1813 and she went to live in Pančevo.

She later married captain and hero of Greek War of Independence Giorgakis Olympios, with whom she moved to Wallachia and later Bucharest. They had three children: Milan, Aleksandar, and Jevrosima. When Giorgakis was also killed during the Battle of Secu monastery in Moldavia on 23 September 1821 at the beginning of Greek Revolution and for the sake of their children's security, she moved with them to Khotyn, Russia, where other people of the Serbian Revolution took refuge.

After the liberation of Greece Stana with children moved to Athens, where she got a small state pension as the widow of the hero Olympios. She died in 1849 or 1850.

In 1907 a play was written about her life, and music was composed by Stevan Hristić. A 1972 Yugoslav TV film "Čučuk Stana" was made based on the play, and she was played by Svetlana Bojković.

A book about her life, Čučuk Stana, 1795-1849 - žena Hajduk Veljka i grčkog narodnog heroja Georgakisa Olimpiosa, by Dušica Popović Stojković was published in 1981.
