= Tears for Sale =

2008 Serbian drama film

- DVD cover
- Directed by: Uroš Stojanović
- Written by: Aleksandar Radivojević (main writer); Uroš Stojanović; Batrić Nenezić; Stevan Koprivica; Srđan Dragojević
- Produced by: Batrić Nenezić
- Starring: Katarina Radivojević; Sonja Kolačarić; Olivera Katarina; Stefan Kapičić; Nenad Jezdić
- Cinematography: Bojana Andrić; Dragan Đorđević; Nenad Vasić
- Edited by: Eve Beloiak; Đorđe Marković; Dejan Urošević
- Music by: Shigeru Umebayashi
- Distributed by: EuropaCorp
- Release date: 30 January 2008
- Running time: 95 minutes
- Country: Serbia
- Language: Serbian
- Budget: US$6 million
- Box office: US$634,620 (Serbia); US$19,314 (France)

Tears for Sale, also known internationally as Charleston & Vendetta or also as Funeral Brides (original title in Serbian: Чарлстон за Огњенку, Čarlston za Ognjenku, literal translation Charleston for Ognjenka, French: Charleston et Vendetta), is a 2008 Serbian drama film.

Directed by Uroš Stojanović, it stars Sonja Kolačarić, Katarina Radivojević, Nenad Jezdić, Stefan Kapičić, and Olivera Katarina.

It was released in Serbia following a January 30, 2008 premiere at Belgrade's Sava Centar. Made on a budget that exceeds €4 million, the movie was shot during summer 2005 as the most expensive Serbian movie ever (until St. George Shoots the Dragon surpassed it a year later). It then went into a long post-production due to specific CGI requirements.

Tears for Sale featured 40 minutes' worth of special effects and over 100,000 metres (330,000 ft) of film, around five times more than the average used in Serbia. The musical score was done by Japanese composer Shigeru Umebayashi. Luc Besson's production and distribution companies Blue Pen and EuropaCorp hold the film's foreign market distribution rights.

In September 2008, the film was shown at the 2008 Toronto International Film Festival, where it had three screenings as part of the festival's Vanguard programme. It was shown at the Santa Barbara 2009 International Film Festival (22 January – 1 February). In August 2009, it premiered in France.

== Plot ==
The movie's plot is set during the 1920s in post-World War I Serbia. Rebuilding after a gruelling armed conflict in which it lost a sizable part of its young male population, the nation is struggling to recover demographically. The situation is especially visible in certain rural parts where this shortage of men threatens to extinguish life completely.

Two sisters, Ognjenka and Mala Boginja from a fictional village that has no males of marrying age, set off for the city in search of good men to bring home.

== Release ==
Before general release, the movie premiered at the 2008 Motovun Film Festival on July 28, 2008, and at the 2008 Toronto International Film Festival in September 2008, under the title Tears for Sale.

In the United States, the film was shown in January 2009 at the Santa Barbara International Film Festival, and in April 2009 at the Syracuse International Film Festival (Syracuse, New York).

On August 12, 2009, the movie had its theatrical release in France. It was shown with the name Charleston et Vendette, under the slogan "La chasse a l’homme est ouverte!" (The hunt for men has begun!).

=== Home media ===
The film is set for DVD distribution in Australia and the United Kingdom through Icon Entertainment International, a subsidiary of Icon Productions.

== Reception ==
=== Box office ===
Shown on twenty screens during its first weekend in general release (February 1–3, 2008), Charleston & Vendetta took in a gross amount of US$80,699. Its second weekend (February 8–10, also on twenty screens) in Serbian theaters was even more successful, with US$92,377 earned. During the calendar year 2008, Tears for Sale was the most watched movie in Serbian cinemas with a total gross of US$634,620.

In France, the movie had a modest box-office take of US$19,314 during its short theatrical run.

=== Critical response ===
==== Domestic ====
Charleston & Vendetta received mixed reviews in the Serbian media. Web magazine Popboks called it a cross between an A movie and a B movie. According to their reviewer Vladislava Vojnović, despite being clearly conceived as an A movie "with production whose plenitude is on full display—from glamorous make-up, costume design, and cinematography over to impeccable picture & sound quality and last but not least Sonja Kolačarić's fascinating portrayal—Charleston & Vendetta also contains many B movie liabilities like a subpar screenplay with plenty of holes".

In similar vein, Politika's film critic Dubravka Lakić praises the movie's look, but has problems with its screenplay oversights, all the while feeling this "postmodern cheerful fairy tale for adults" is "more of a glamorously packaged oversized trailer than a story-based product with coherent beginning, middle and end".

The review penned by B92's Gavrilo Petrović was more of the same, extolling the film's "magical look that brings certain French blockbusters to mind", while criticizing "the way dramaturgy takes a back seat to aggressive spectacle sometime into the film with two initially likeable heroines suddenly turning into detached fashion models".

NIN magazine's Saša Janković was critical, calling the film "an example of Serbian megalomania" and adding that "its screenplay is incomplete while the direction is at times fairly arbitrary".

The film received a positive review from Blic's Milan Vlajčić, who called it "an extraordinary moment for new Serbian film". In between praises for the whole cast, Vlajčić especially notices director and writer Uroš Stojanović, "whose debut showed maturity in stylistic composition of a comedy that contains patterns of quite a few genres—from melodrama to fantasy".

==== International ====
Now magazine gave it a very poor one-star mark, with its reviewer referring to it as "a demented Serbian fantasy". He continued with describing it as "a Serbian version of Amélie, if you think Amélie is a movie about hot ladies with prominent facial features interacting with a series of expensive digital effects" before exclaiming: "I'm tempted to hail this as one of the fest's must-see movies—you really must see it to understand the depths of its batshit craziness".

Todd Brown of showcase.ca and twitchfilm.net loved it, calling it "a remarkable film on a number of levels that manages what seems like an impossible task: balancing the tragic history of its home nation with a sense of legitimate magic and wonder". He has further praise for director Stojanovic and the "stunning visuals". Finally, he glows about the movie feeling like "a Grimms' fairy tale come to life, a world where magic exists but is also accompanied by darkness, death, sex and more".

In Variety, Alissa Simon called the film "a postmodern allegorical tale" which "succeeds in poking fun at various Serbian national myths and symbols with its strong, lusty, independent women, eager-to-fight men and sacrilegious shenanigans in a hearse and among tombstones". Among praises for the visuals and special effects, she admits that the movie "will require careful handling and critical support to reach international audiences".

The reviews in the French press were somewhat reserved. Le Monde praised "the spellbinding atmosphere with flights of poetry, boisterous jubilation, and Yugoslav frenzy that brings the fever of Emir Kusturica to mind", but has issues with the "chaotic screenplay arcs drawn from Serbian folklore, culture, and history with codes that escape us".
