= Black Gruya and the Stone of Wisdom =

- Directed by: Marko Marinković
- Starring: Nenad Jezdić; Nikola Kojo
- Release date: 31 January 2007
- Running time: 1h 38min
- Country: Serbia
- Language: Serbian

Black Gruya and the Stone of Wisdom (Serbian: Crni Gruja i kamen mudrosti) is a 2007 Serbian comedy film directed by Marko Marinković.

== Cast ==
- Nenad Jezdić - Crni Gruja
- Nikola Kojo - Karadjordje
- Boris Milivojević - Bole
- Marinko Madžgalj - Ceda Velja
- Zoran Cvijanović - Zmago
- Dragan Jovanović - Omer
- Nebojša Ilić - Mladen
- Ognjen Amidžić - Radonja
- Dragan Bjelogrlić - Silberliber
