= Made in YU =

Swedish action drama film

- Directed by: Miko Lazić
- Written by: Vladimir Ćosić
- Starring: Saša Drakulić; Dragan Jovanović; Nataša Ninković
- Production company: Filmkreatörerna Prah och Björk
- Release date: November 11, 2005 (Sweden)
- Running time: 105 min
- Country: Sweden
- Languages: Serbian, Swedish
- Budget: €1,000,000
- Box office: €23,985,760

Made in YU, also known as Made in Yugoslavia, is a 2005 Swedish action drama film directed by Miko Lazić.

== Plot ==
The story begins with a suicide attempt by Petar Petrović, a Serbian worker in Sweden. Peter plays the lottery for years and finally managed to win it and bought a house by the sea. Unfortunately, war broke out and his house was seized, as according to him, more than enough to convince him of suicide.

Mara, his wife, by all means tries to convince him of the crazy ideas from neighbors and also conceal the true state of affairs. Through a sequence in the film we learn that the first of Petrovic, Savo, came to Sweden and that his call came to Peter and Braco. Initially, their work provided the Savo and they paid him a commission, of course, reduced, however, because the brothers, but as the years passed, each started their work. Peter Mara opened the pizzeria, bakery Braco, while Savo left the shady dealings and often borrowed money from Peter to bring back the debts. Unlike Peter, Braco was not in the mood for a loan, because he thought that gave him enough and that he came back everything they owe.

== Cast ==
- Saša Drakulić as Mihaljo age 24
- Slobodan Ninković as Petar
- Dragan Jovanović as Braco
- Milorad Mandić as Savo
- Pavle Martinoski as Mihaljo age 16
- Nataša Ninković as Maria
- Marko Jeremić as Zoran
- Velimir 'Bata' Živojinović as Farfar
- Josif Tatić as Mate
- Bogdan Diklić as Muharem
- Lisa Lindgren as Gerd
- Goran Marjanović as Milo
- Georgi Staykov as Stevo
- Per-Gunnar Hylén as Ingemar
- Petar Božović as Krsto
