= Dragan Jovanović (actor) =

Serbian actor and politician (born 1965)

- Драган Јовановић
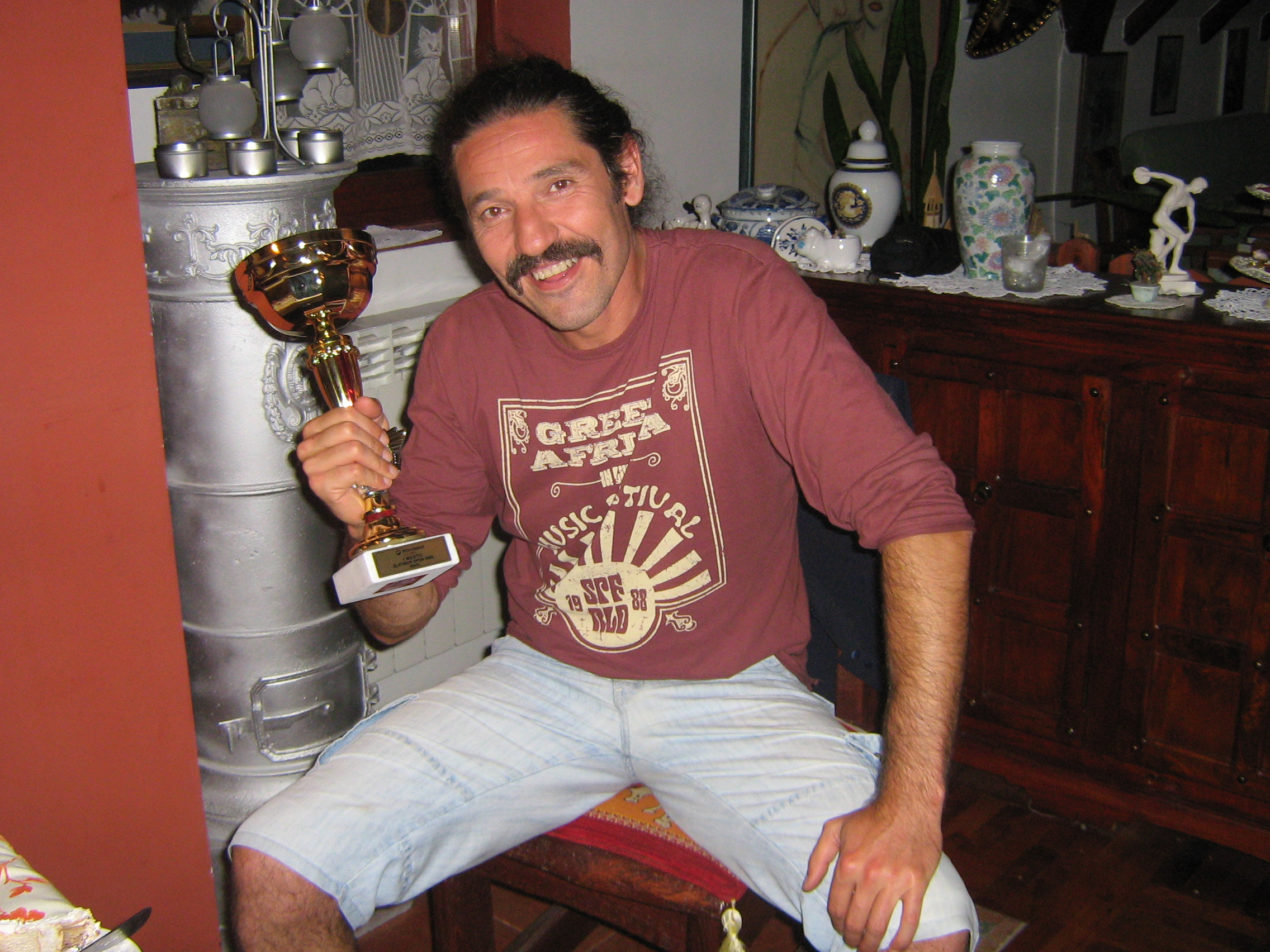
- Jovanović in September 2009

Member of the National Assembly
- Incumbent
- Assumed office 17 November 2026

Personal details
- Born: 4 October 1965 (age 61) Belgrade, SR Serbia, SFR Yugoslavia
- Party: Independent
- Other political affiliations: Student List (2026–present)
- Spouse: Branka Pujić (m. 1992)
- Children: 1
- Education: Faculty of Dramatic Arts
- Occupation: Actor
- Nickname: Gagi

Dragan Jovanović (Serbian: Драган Јовановић; born 4 October 1965), also known as Gagi, is a Serbian film, television and stage actor and politician. A member of the Yugoslav Drama Theatre since 1990, he is known for his roles in the television series Srećni ljudi, Stižu dolari and Moj rođak sa sela. During the 2024–2026 Serbian anti-corruption protests he became one of the most visible public figures supporting the students. Elected on the Student List in the 2026 parliamentary election, he has been a member of the National Assembly since 17 November 2026.

== Career ==
Jovanović graduated from the Faculty of Dramatic Arts in Belgrade in 1990. The same year he became a permanent member of the ensemble of the Yugoslav Drama Theatre, where his roles have included Teddy in Baal, the Devil in Calling Bird and Adraste in The Theatre of Illusions.

With several colleagues he founded the theatre group The Kuguars, which performed the collective productions Let's Play, The Funny Side of History and The Funny Side of Music. At the Budva City Theatre he played Trinculo in The Tempest, and at the Zvezdara Theatre he played Fran in John's Life and Alex in The Flames of Passion. At Madlenianum he directed Don Quixote and played the title role.

== Political career ==
=== Anti-corruption protests ===
Jovanović publicly supported the student-led protests that began after the Novi Sad railway station canopy collapse in November 2024. In December 2024, after a large demonstration at Slavija Square in Belgrade, he appeared in a video singing an adapted version of the student anthem "Gaudeamus igitur" in support of the students.

Over the following months he became one of the best-known faces of the protests. In March 2025 he wrote the song "Znam" in support of the protesters. Before the June 2025 local election in Kosjerić, he sang folk songs with residents while campaigning with the students, and on 28 June 2025 he performed "Zidareva ljubav" at the Vidovdan rally at Slavija. During the blockades in Zemun in mid-2025 he mediated between the police and the protesters, passing on police warnings to the crowd while telling the officers that the protesters were "your people".

On 24 April 2026, Jovanović was pepper-sprayed in Zemun's main street after approaching supporters of the Serbian Progressive Party (SNS) at their campaign stands, which had been set up next to stands of the student movement. He described the incident as "another very bad move by the authorities".

=== 2026 parliamentary election ===
On 13 September 2026, while supporting citizens queuing to sign in support of the Student List in Zemun, he confirmed that he was a candidate on the list for the 25 October snap election. He said that the vote would require "solidarity, discipline and readiness to protect the election results" and added: "We will not stop until we win freedom and justice." When the list was published the following day, he was placed 122nd.

The Student List won 140 of the 250 seats. Jovanović entered the National Assembly when the mandates of all 250 members were confirmed at the constitutive session of the 15th convocation on 17 November 2026.

== Personal life ==
Jovanović is married to actress Branka Pujić; their daughter, Anđela, is also an actress.

== Filmography ==
=== Film ===
Year	Title	Role	Notes
1988	Šta radiš večeras	Jovke	Segment "Amsterdam"
1988	Balkan Express 2	German soldier	
1989	Najbolji	Čepir	
1990	Baal	Teddy	
1990	Početni udarac	Danko	
1990	Sveto mesto	Priest Toma	
1992	Zagreb-Beograd preko Sarajeva	Miloš Crnjanski	
1992	The Black Bomber	The Bomber	
1993	Say Why Have You Left Me	Marko	
1993	Napadač	Paperboy	
1994	Dva sata kvalitetnog programa	Prigradski	
1995	Dvoboj za troje	Igor	
1995	Svadbeni marš	Leonardo from Vinča	
1998	Barking at the Stars	Gradimir Stević	
1998	Cabaret Balkan	Kosta	
1998	Stršljen	Inspector Boban Đorđević	
2001	Boomerang	Toni	
2002	Ko čeka dočeka		
2003	The Professional	Gipsani	
2003	A Small World	Corrupt policeman	
2005	Made in YU	Braco	
2006	The Optimists	Golub	
2007	Crni Gruja i kamen mudrosti	Omer	
2007	Dva	God	
2009	Comrade Black in WWII	Adolf Hitler; James Bold; Mufti Halid Mulahasanefendijadefendijaomerpašasehović	Multiple roles
2012	Šešir profesora Koste Vujića	Military training professor	

=== Television ===
Year	Title	Role	Notes
1993–1994	Srećni ljudi	Milun "Lune" Ščekić	
2004–2006	Stižu dolari	Predrag "Pesa" Ljutić	
2008–2011	Moj rođak sa sela	Dragorad "Drakče" Malešević	
2012	Ruža vjetrova	Ivan Marušić	
