= Nataša Tapušković =

Serbian actress

- Наташа Тапушковић
- Born: 27 August 1975 (age 50); Kruševac, SR Serbia, SFR Yugoslavia
- Occupation: Actress

Nataša Tapušković (née Šolak; Serbian Cyrillic: Наташа Тапушковић; born 27 August 1975) is a Serbian actress. She is famous for her role as Danica Janković in Barking at the Stars (1998) and for her role as Bosnian hostage Sabaha in Emir Kusturica's Life Is a Miracle (2004).

== Filmography ==
Year	Title	Format	Role	Notes
1997	Pokondirena tikva	TV movie	Evica	
1998	Barking at the Stars	Film	Danica Janković	
1999	Proleće u Limasolu	Film	Vanja Teodorović	
2004	Život je čudo	Film	Sabaha	
2004	Život je čudo	TV mini-series	Sabaha	
2007	Pozorište u kući	TV series	Olga Petrović	
2008	Šišanje	Film	Inspector Lidija	
2009	Poslednja audijencija	TV series	Queen Natalija	
2012	Folk	TV series	Teacher Slađa	
2012	Balkan Is Not Dead	Film	Eleni	
2013	Spomenik	Film		
2015	Monument to Michael Jackson	Film	Ljubinka	
