= Milan Gutović =

Serbian actor (1946–2021)

- Милан Гутовић
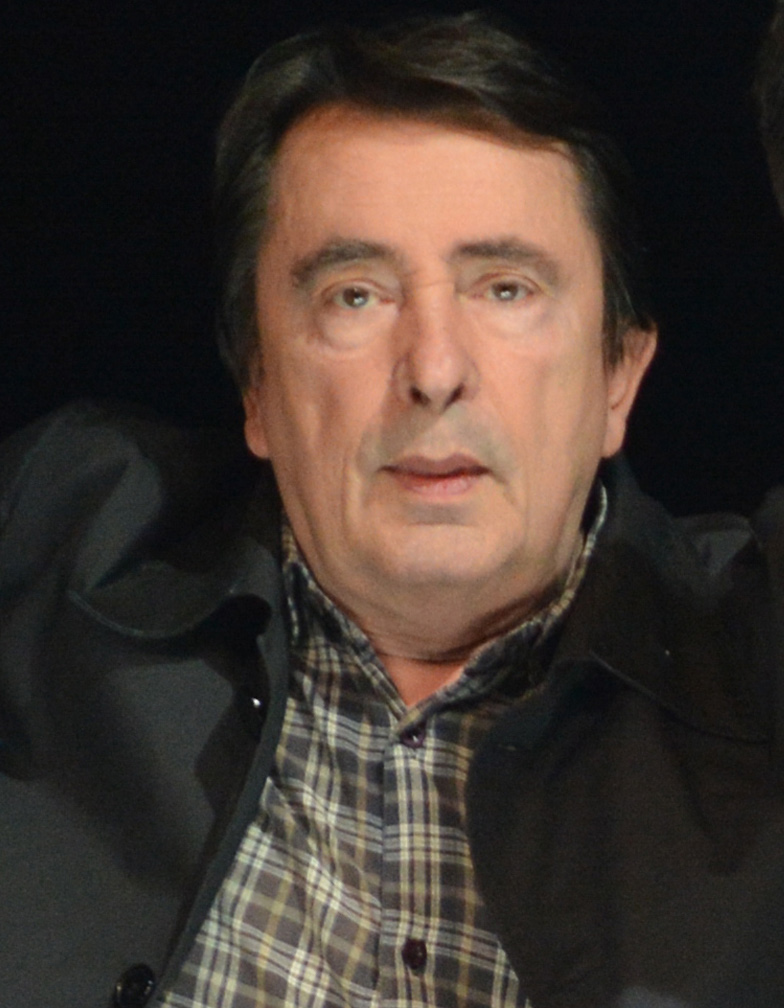
- Gutović in 2015
- Born: 11 August 1946; Umka, PR Serbia, FPR Yugoslavia
- Died: 25 August 2021 (aged 75); Belgrade, Serbia
- Education: Faculty of Dramatic Arts, University of Arts in Belgrade
- Occupations: Actor; cabaret performer; television personality
- Years active: 1967–2021
- Known for: Portrayal of Srećko Šojić
- Spouse: Biljana Knežević (m. 2001–2011)

Milan "Lane" Gutović (Serbian Cyrillic: Милан "Лане" Гутовић; 11 August 1946 – 25 August 2021) was a Serbian and Yugoslav actor, cabaret performer and television personality.

He is best known for his portrayal of Srećko Šojić in Tesna koža and Bela lađa.

== Early life and education ==
Gutović was born on 11 August 1946, in a Belgrade suburban neighborhood of Umka. He graduated from the High School of Electrical Engineering "Nikola Tesla" in Belgrade, where he earned the nickname "Lane". Initially, Gutović wanted to study at the Faculty of Mathematics, although he later enrolled in the Belgrade Academy for theater, cinema, radio and television, from which he graduated in 1967. Later that year, he became a member of the Yugoslav Drama Theatre.

== Career ==
=== Film and television career ===
After becoming a member in the Yugoslav Drama Theatre in 1967, he and other now-prominent actors, became members of the so-called "Bojan's babies" club which included actors that were part of a permanent engagement in the Yugoslav Drama Theatre. Gutović's film career began in 1968, in the movie Bekstva. His first main role in a movie was in Mića Milošević's movie Drugarčine, which was recorded in 1979. Two years later, Gutović was contacted by Milošević to act in Laf u srcu where he played Srećko Šojić. Gutović continued his role as Srećko Šojić in Tesna koža ("Tight Skin"), which was recorded in 1982. His first major role on television was in the comedy series Diplomci, although, he earned more popularity in Bolji Život and Otvorena vrata.

Between 2006 and 2011, he again portrayed Srećko Šojić in Bela lađa ("A White Boat"), which was a loose continuation of Tesna koža. After leaving Bela lađa, he retired.

=== Cabaret career ===
Gutović is also widely known around the world for his A usual evening cabaret, which he performed from the 1990s until his death. His cabaret was the first show played in Serbian in the Broadway theatre.

Besides performing in the National Theatre in Belgrade, he also performed in the Montenegrin National Theatre, Zvezdara Theatre, Slavija Theatre, BITEF and many theatres. Between 2020 and June 2021, he performed in the "Putujuće pozorište Šopalović" show, in the Yugoslav Drama Theatre.

== Personal life ==
Gutović was married twice, although no information is known about his first wife, with whom he had two sons, Jakov and Spasoje. He was later married to Biljana Knežević between 2001 and 2011. Gutović also had a daughter Milica, an actress and ballerina from his first marriage. Gutović had an older sister called Bojana. Later in his life, he moved to Kumodraž, and in his last years he was often seen camping and fishing.

In 2006, he became a member of the National Theatre in Belgrade, and between 2006 and 2008 he served as the president of the Association of Drama Artists of Serbia.

Gutović was awarded multiple awards, such as "Staueta Ćuran" and "Sterija award" in 1978, "Zoran Radmilović award" in 1988, "Golden Arena award" in 1989, "Nušić award" in 2005, "Car Konstantin award" in 2006, "Raša Plaović award" in 2007 and "Zlatni Ćuran award" in 2020.

He was also an outspoken critic of Serbian president Aleksandar Vučić and his regime.

=== Death ===
In June 2021, Gutović contracted COVID-19 during the COVID-19 pandemic in Serbia and had to cancel all of his shows.

On 19 August 2021, Gutović's health suddenly deteriorated and he was transported to the Military Medical Academy for treatment. He died on 25 August 2021, 14 days after his 75th birthday. According to Irfan Mensur, Gutović attended chemotherapy sessions and never gave up fighting.

== Filmography ==
=== Film ===
Year	Title	Role	Ref.
1965	Provereno, nema mina	A young man on the street	
1967	Oh, divljino		
1968	Neverovatni cilinder Nj. V. kralja Kristijana		
1968	Bekstva	Skojevac	
1969	Veličanstveni rogonja	Estrigo	
1969	Put gospodina Perisona		
1969	Hajde da se igramo		
1969	Preko mrtvih	Dragoslav Stojanović	
1969	Leći na rudu		
1969	Plava Jevrejka	Himself	
1969	Kod zelenog papagaja		
1970	Izgubljeni sin		
1970	Omer i Merima		
1970	Krunisanje		
1970	Naši maniri		
1970	Protekcija	Svetislav	
1970	Francuski bez muke		
1970	Lepa parada	Stevan	
1971	Suđenje Floberu		
1971	Diplomci	Dragutin Guta Pavlović	
1972	Amfitrion 38		
1972	Smeh sa scene: Jugoslovensko dramsko pozorište		
1972	Poraz		
1972	Proždrljivost		
1972	Musa iz cirkusa		
1972	Buba u uhu	Kamij Sandebiz	
1972	Devojka sa Kosmaja		
1972	Čučuk Stana	Hajduk Veljko Petrović	
1972	Tragovi crne devojke		
1973	Dubravka		
1973	Brauningova verzija		
1973	Bela košulja	Jug	
1973	Sutjeska		
1974	Meri Rouz		
1974	SB zatvara krug	Boban	
1974	Bataljon je odlučio		
1975	Sinovi	Princ	
1975	Tena		
1975	Nagrada godine		
1976	Povratak otpisanih	Kapetan Todorović	
1976	Beogradska deca		
1976	Prvi garnizon		
1977	Mikelanđelo Buonaroti		
1977	Jedan dan		
1977	Pod istragom		
1978	Maska	Čezare	
1978	Pučina	Vladimir Nedeljković	
1978	Gospođa ministarka	Čeda Urošević	
1979	Srećna porodica	Tennis instructor	
1979	Drugarčine	Poručnik Ilić	
1979	Ivan Goran Kovačić		
1981	Kir Janja	Notaroš Mišić	
1981	Berlin kaput		
1981	Gazija	Morić	
1981	Laf u srcu	Srećko Šojić	
1981	500 kada	Cojko	
1981	Erogena zona	Momčilo Stojisavljević	
1982	Tesna koža	Srećko Šojić	
1982	Stenica	Prišipkin	
1982	Krojači džinsa	Pakito	
1982	Četvrtak umesto petka	Lane	
1983	Sumrak		
1983	Razvojni put Bore Šnajdera	Vitomir Kambasković	
1983	Još ovaj put	Vasa	
1984	Celovečernji the Kid	Don Francisko	
1985	Indijsko ogledalo	Judge	
1985	Debeli i mršavi	Bogoljub Jakšić	
1986	Putujuće pozorište Šopalović	Filip Trnavac	
1986	Crna Marija	Kodža	
1986	Majstor i Šampita	Laslo Marcipan Fogel	
1986	Rodoljupci	Smrdić	
1986	Šmeker	Neša	
1987	Dogodilo se na današnji dan		
1987	Tesna koža 2	Srećko Šojić	
1988	Špijun na štiklama	Narcis Zec	
1988	Ortaci	Sima	
1988	Tesna koža 3	Srećko Šojić	
1989	Poltron		
1989	Boj na Kosovu	Ivan Kosančić	
1990	Pokojnik	Mladen Đaković	
1990	Kolubarska bitka		
1990	Sumnjivo lice	Aleksa Žunić	
1990	Valjevska bolnica	Gavrilo Stanković	
1991	Holivud ili propast		
1991	Tesna koža 4	Srećko Šojić	
2002	Zajedničko putovanje	Joakim Vujić	
2003	Mali svet	Priest	
2004	Te quiero, Radiša	Radiša Radišić	
2005	Imam nešto važno da vam kažem	Director	
2006	Uslovna sloboda	Ozren Ćuk	
2006	Sedam i po	Director	
2010	Zlatno tele		
2011	Mali ljubavni bog	Milan	
2017	Vrati se Zone	Jordan	

=== Television ===
Year	Title	Role	Ref.
1967	Visoška hronika	Marks	
1968	Maksim našeg doba		
1969	Mladići i devojke 2		
1972	Selo bez seljaka		
1973	Od danas do sutra		
1973	Pozorište u kući	Housekeeper	
1975	Lepeza		
1975	Život je lep	Dovniković	
1976	Morava 76		
1976	Čast mi je pozvati vas	Lane	
1977	Profesionalci		
1977	Usijane glave	Bumbaširević	
1978	Povratak otpisanih	Kapetan Todorović	
1979	Srećna porodica	Tennis instructor	
1980	Bilo, pa prošlo		
1981	Svetozar Marković	Sava Grujić	
1981	Sedam sekretara SKOJ-a	Mijo Oreški	
1984	Ne tako davno		
1984	Ulični pevači		
1984	Uvek sa vama		
1984	Formula 1		
1985	Daj mi krila jedan krug	Biljan	
1986	Frka		
1987	Bolji život	Đan Karlo Maroti	
1988	Vuk Karadžić	Stevan Perkov	
1989	Specijalna redakcija		
1989	Metla bez drške	Ognjen	
1990	Metla bez drške 2	Ognjen	
1991	Metla bez drške 3	Ognjen	
1994	Otvorena vrata	Dragoslav Jakovljević	
1996	Dobro veče, deco	Pustolov	
1998	Kanal mimo	Jelenko	
1998	Kod lude ptice		
2002	Vršačka pozorišna jesen		
2006	Bela lađa	Srećko Šojić	
2007	Ono naše što nekad bejaše	Ćir Manta	
2008	Neki čudni ljudi	Lazar Gašić	
2010	Šesto čulo		
2013	Otvorena vrata 2	Dragoslav Jakovljević	
2014	Mala istorija Srbije	Lane	
2017	Državni posao	Atanasije hadži Tonić	

Awards
New title	Serbian Oscar Of Popularity; The Male Actor of the Year; 2009	Succeeded by Nebojša Glogovac
