= Radmila Živković =

Serbian actress (1953–2024)

- Радмила Живковић
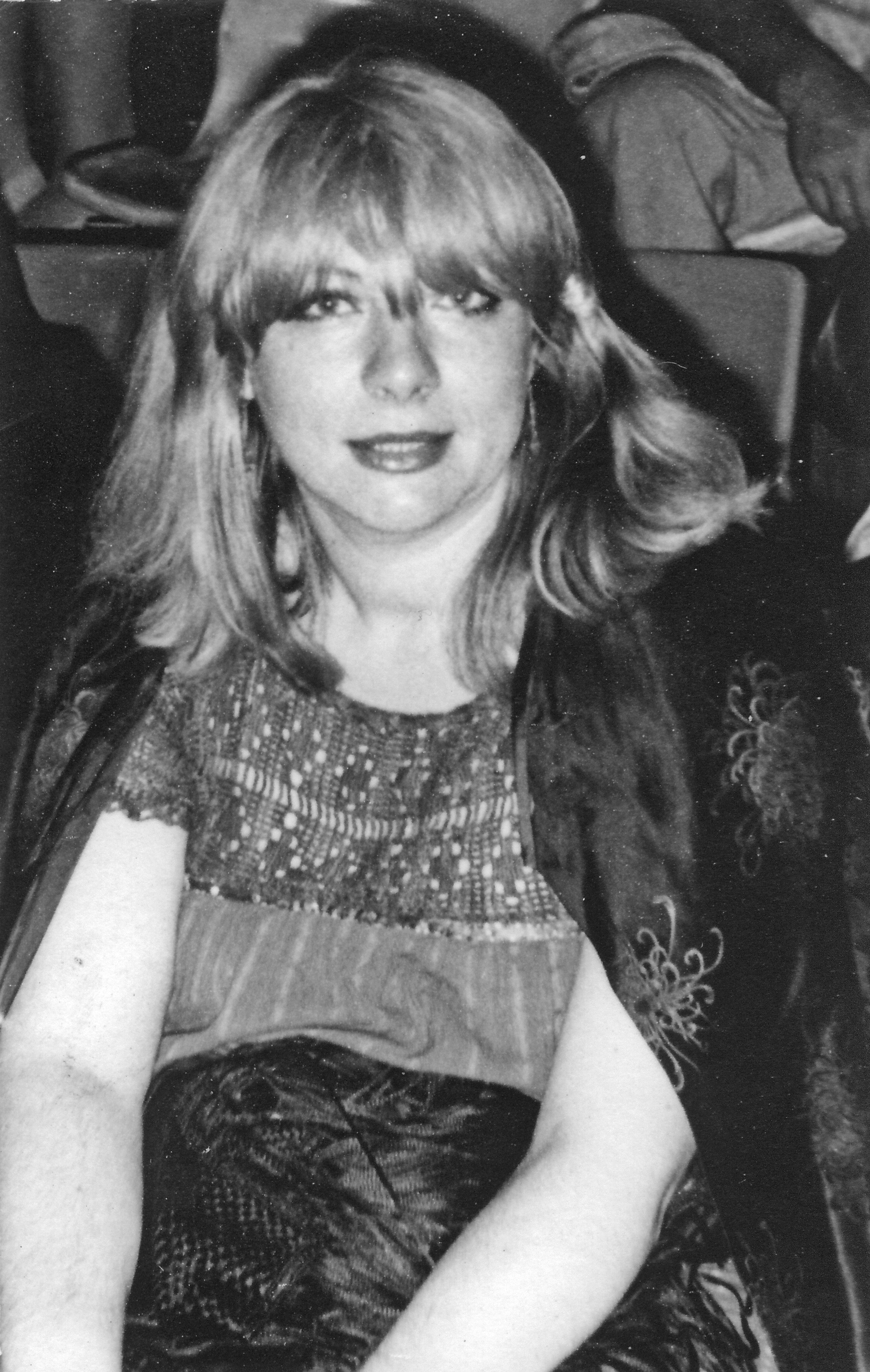
- Živković in 1984
- Born: 14 January 1953; Kruševac, PR Serbia, FPR Yugoslavia
- Died: 20 September 2024 (aged 71); Belgrade, Serbia
- Education: Faculty of Dramatic Arts
- Alma mater: University of Arts in Belgrade
- Occupation: Actress
- Years active: 1969–2024
- Children: 1

Radmila Živković (Serbian Cyrillic: Радмила Живковић; 14 January 1953 – 20 September 2024) was a Serbian film, theatre, and television actress. She appeared in more than seventy films from 1969. Živković died in Belgrade on 20 September 2024, at the age of 71.

== Selected filmography ==
Year	Title	Role
2002	Zona Zamfirova	Doka
2000	Shadows of Memories	Emma's mother
1989	Kuduz	Anđa
1989	The Meeting Point	Lepa
1982	Variola Vera	Nurse Zaga
1980	Special Treatment	Mila
