= Zoran Petrović =

Zoran Petrović may refer to:

- Zoran Petrović (referee) (1952–2024), Serbian football referee
- Zoran Petrović (writer) (1954–2018), Serbian poet, novelist, and screenwriter
- Zoran Petrović (water polo) (born 1960), Serbian Olympic water polo player
- Zoran Petrović (footballer) (born 1997), Montenegrin footballer
