= Milovan Vitezović =

Serbian writer (1944–2022)

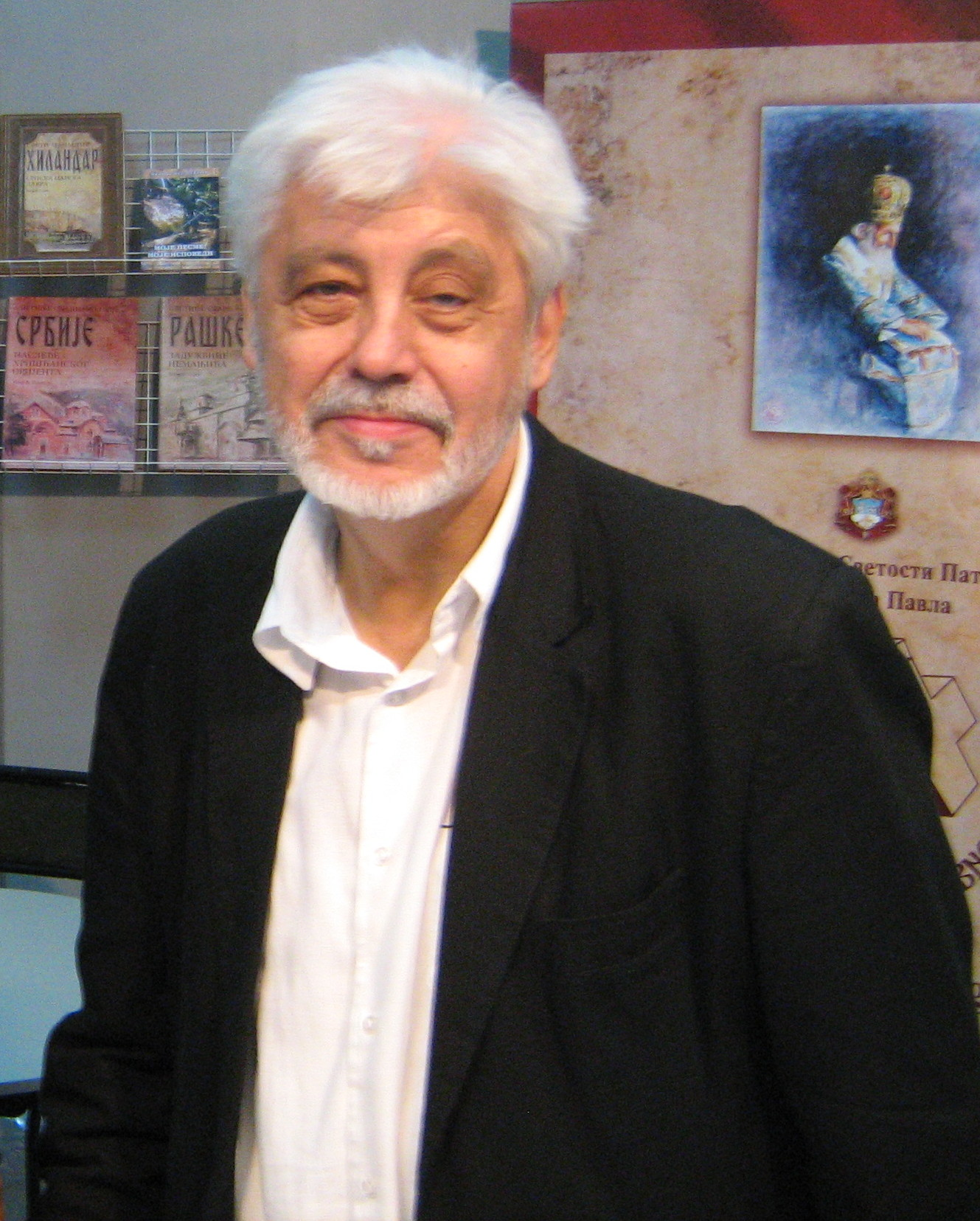
- Vitezović at the 2013 Belgrade Book Fair
- Born: 11 September 1944; Kosjerić, German-occupied Serbia
- Died: 22 March 2022 (aged 77); Belgrade, Serbia
- Education: University of Belgrade Faculty of Philology
- Occupations: Writer, professor and screenwriter

Signature
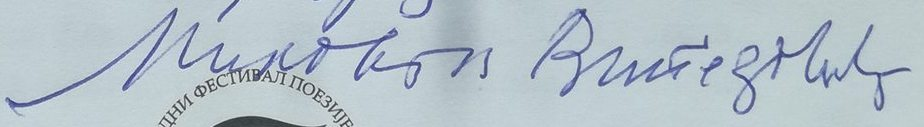

Milovan Vitezović (Serbian Cyrillic: Милован Витезовић; 11 September 1944 – 22 March 2022) was a Serbian writer, professor and screenwriter.

He wrote poems, novels, essays, prose literature for children, reviews, aphorisms, movies and TV scripts. He published more than forty books and was represented in over fifty various anthologies.

His aphorisms were published in a series of European newspapers, such as the Hamburg Stern and Moscow's Sunday Times, and translated into Greek, Romanian, Hebrew, Swedish and Italian. Vitezović was one of the few Serbian and Yugoslav contemporary writers, whose books were banned and even burned in its first edition – the collection of aphorisms Srce me je otkucalo. His satirical texts were often published in the Serbian magazine Jež (Hedgehog).

He is the author of numerous television dramas and series, texts for theatrical performances and film scripts.

Vitezović died in March 2022 from COVID-19, during the COVID-19 pandemic in Serbia.

== Biography ==
Vitezović was born in Vitezovići at Kosjerić on 11 September 1944. He was educated in Tubić, Kosjerić, Užice and Belgrade, where he graduated from the University of Belgrade Faculty of Philology, department of general literature, and Faculty of Dramatic Arts, department of movies and TV scripts.

He was editor of operating in Književne novine (Literary Newspaper). In the youth magazine Susret omladine (Youth Meeting), he worked as an editor for literature until 1969, and since then as the editor of the journal Čivija (Pins). He was the editor of a feature series on RTS from 1977 to 1991, when he became the editor-in-chief of the RTS Arts and Entertainment Program. He was a member of the Association of Writers of Serbia (and its president from 2018) and the Serbian PEN Center and he also spoke and wrote for Nacionalna revija (National Review), a magazine on the national heritage of Serbia. In 2001, he became an associate professor at the Academy of Arts, Belgrade.

== Literary work ==
His narrative style is characterised by a natural flow of events, spontaneity, and humour. His works cover a wide range of subjects, including historical figures and events, fictional characters, and youth literature depicting contemporary life. In addition to portraying individuals and their worlds, his writing presents broader depictions of society, offering insight into the atmosphere and context of different times and places.

His works can be found in school curricula along with German high school textbooks. As guest editor of the Department of Textbooks and Teaching Aids, capital items in the edition edited by the selected pieces of Bogdan Popović, Jovan Skerlić, Milan Kašanin and Stojan Novaković.

=== Selected novels ===
- Professor Kosta Vujić's Hat
- Barking at the Stars
- Milena from Knez Mihailova
- Sveta ljubav
- Hajduk Veljko Petrović
- The European Prince Miloš
- The Socks of King Peter

=== Aphorisms ===
- Man, get angry,
- The heart beat me

=== TV dramas and series ===
- Where The Yellow Lemon Blooms
- Kingdom of Serbia
- The Principality of Serbia
- Dimitrije Tucović
- Vuk Karadžić
- Then Lola invents slogans
- Student Age
- Snohvatice I-II

=== Film scripts ===
- Extramarital Planner
- Branislav Nušić
- Lotus, life, death, Filip Filipovic
- Barking at the Stars
- King Peter of Serbia, co-writer

== Awards ==
He received numerous awards of which the most important: Zmaj Children Games (1978) Great Charter Bazjaške in Bucharest in 2005, Kočića Award (2005) - Republika Srpska, Golden Gašino pen (2006), Public Voice Award Meša Selimović the second place (2000).

He was a candidate for the Anthology of the world's best satirist, which was published in the United States 2007.

The Novi Sad June 2007, went to his honor to receive Zmajev poetic rod and open Zmaj Children Games, the largest festival of children's creativity in Europe.

Adaptation of his novel Barking at the Stars won the prestigious award domestic Golden Arena Novi Sad and the award in Herceg Novi.

He was awarded the Sretenje Order by the Republic of Serbia.
