= Katarina Radivojević =

Serbian actress (born 1979)

- Катарина Радивојевић
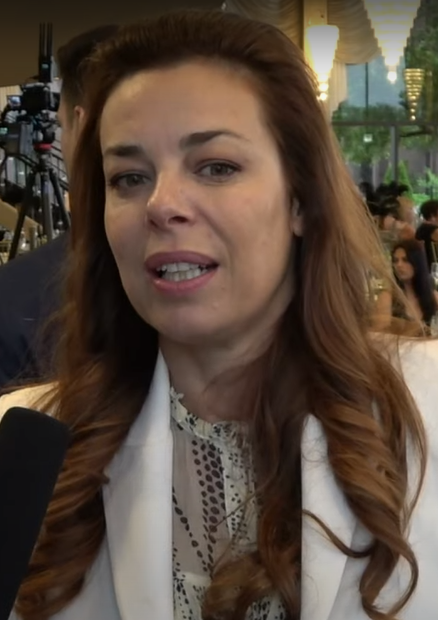
- Radivojević in 2022
- Born: Katarina Radivojević; 29 March 1979 (age 47); Belgrade, SR Serbia, SFR Yugoslavia
- Occupation: Actress
- Years active: 1992–present

Katarina Radivojević (Serbian Cyrillic: Катарина Радивојевић; born 29 March 1979) is a Serbian actress. She is known for her roles in films such as Zona Zamfirova and Tears for Sale.

== Personal life ==
Radivojević was born in Belgrade. She is good friends with actress Marija Vicković and singer Ana Stanić.

== Filmography ==
=== Film ===
Year	Title	Role	Notes
1992	Полицајац са Петловог брда	Sonja	
2002	Lola	Lola	Television Film
2002	Klasa 2002	Girl	Television Film
2002	Зона Замфирова	Zona Zamfirova	
2002	Лавиринт	Tamara Lojtes	
2004	The Robbery of the Third Reich	Ana Muci	
2004	The Little Fox	Dunja	voice role
2005	Libero	Peggy	
2005	Potera za Sreć(k)om	Cica	
2007	S.O.S. – Spasite naše duše	Danka	
2008	Tears for Sale	Little Goddess	
2008	Morphine	Ekaterina Karlovna	

=== Television ===
Year	Title	Role	Notes
1993	Policajac sa Petlovog brda	Sonja	
1994	Policajac sa Petlovog brda 2	Sonja	
2003	Laku noć, deco	Girl	
2004	Dangube!	Kaća	
2007–2008	Ljubav i mržnja	Ivana	
2009–2010	Najbolje godine	Lorena Levaj	
2010	Sva ta ravnica	Helena Hercegi	series regular

=== Theater ===
In 2009 Katarina Radivojevic had her New York City debut. She was the lead in Off Broadway show Painkillers, directed by Serbian-American director Sanja Beštić in Theatre Row in Times Square.
