= Zanka (Tanzanian ward) =

Administrative ward in Tanzania

Coordinates: 5°50′S 35°46′E

Zanka is an administrative ward in the Bahi District of the Dodoma Region of Tanzania. According to 2016 population estimates, the ward has a total population of 10,744.
