= Žanka Stokić =

Serbian actress

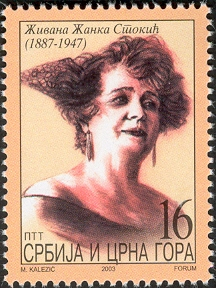
- Stokić on a 2003 issue Serbian postage stamp
- Born: Živana Stokić; 24 January 1887; Veliko Gradište, Kingdom of Serbia
- Died: 21 July 1947 (aged 60); Belgrade, PR Serbia, FPR Yugoslavia
- Occupation: Actress
- Years active: 1902–1944

Živana "Žanka" Stokić (Serbian Cyrillic: Живана Жанка Стокић; 24 January 1887 – 21 July 1947) was a Serbian actress.

Though most popular for her work in comedy, she also excelled in dramatic roles. Often referred to as the "Serbian Sarah Bernhardt" and "Great Žanka", she is considered by critics and many of her peers as the greatest Serbian actress of all time.

== Early life ==
Born Živana Stokić in Veliko Gradište in eastern Serbia on 24 January 1887, her baker-turned-police-clerk father Bogosav died when Živana was still an infant. Her mother Julka then remarried—to a widower priest Aleksandar "Sanda" Nikolajević—and moved to the village of Rabrovo (modern day municipality of Kučevo). As a result, Rabrovo had been reported as Žanka Stokić's birthplace for decades in the latter part of the 20th century until data discovered during the 1990s showed otherwise. The youngster didn’t get along with her stepfather, deciding at age 14 to run away from home to Zaječar where she married a local tailor. The marital union was not a happy one, and within a year, in 1902, teenage Žanka ran away from her husband, too—this time by joining a travelling acting troupe.

== Career ==
=== Early works ===
Stokić's first acting mentor was Ljubomir "Čvrga" Rajičić, head of the company of travelling actors she ran away from her husband with. Originally, she did errands as a washerwoman for the troupe. In her first role, Tereza in Bračne noći in 1902, she became a local sensation. Čvrga's troupe soon split, and Žanka joined several former colleagues on a tour of Vojvodina, Bosnia, and Croatia — border areas of the neighbouring Austria-Hungary where Serbian is spoken.

She then acted in the companies of Mika Bakić, Dimitrije Nešić, and Mihailo "Era" Ratković. In 1907 in Varaždin she got her first dramatic role, a widow in Nada. That same year she became a member of the Osijek Theatre where she was noticed by the theatrologist Branko Gavella. On a guest tour to Belgrade in 1911, twenty-three-year-old Stokić left an impression on Milan Grol, literary critic and chief of the National Theatre in Belgrade, who offered her a job.

=== National Theatre ===
Originally a temp, she soon became a full member of the company, appearing in over 100 starring and supporting roles during her career. Gavella personally directed her in Beaumarchais's The Marriage of Figaro (as Suzanne), Edmond Rostand's Cyrano de Bergerac and Jovan Sterija Popović's Rodoljupci. Other roles include: Dorine (Tartuffe by Molière), Madame Sans-Gêne (by Victorien Sardou), Katyusha (Resurrection by Leo Tolstoy), Mrs. Warren (Mrs. Warren's Profession by George Bernard Shaw) and was especially successful as Toinette in Molière's The Imaginary Invalid. In national repertoire she distinguished herself in the roles of Fema (Pokondirena tikva, by Jovan Sterija Popović), Sultanija/Pela (Zla žena, also by Sterija), Nera (The Hoax, by Milovan Glišić), Emina (Zulumćar, by Svetozar Ćorović), Ruška (by Petar Petrović Pecija) and Jela (U zatišju, by Uroš S. Dojčinović).

Žanka's broadest popularity, however, rested on her roles in the works of one of the greatest Serbian playwrights, Branislav Nušić. They include Innkeeper Janja (in Foundling), Sarka (Bereaved Family), Mrs. Spasić (SYEW – Society of Yugoslav Emancipated Women), Juliška (Travel Around the World), Mica (Authority), but above everything, Živka in The Cabinet Minister's Wife. Written by Nušić specifically for her, and premiering on May 25, 1929, under the direction of Vitomir Bogić, it was a pinnacle of her career which acquired her the nicknames of Great Žanka and the greatest Serbian actress. Until 1941, the play had over 200 performances, with guest performances in theatres in Vienna, Prague, Sofia, Warsaw, Kraków and Vilnius.

She made one motion picture, Grešnica bez greha (Sinner without a sin), in 1927, directed by Kosta Novaković and co-starring Viktor Starčić.

== Personal life ==
After running away from her first husband in 1902, he found her, and with beatings and physical force, took her back to his home. She ran away again. This time members of the troop stood in her defense, and she remained in the company. Well known actor Aleksandar Aca Gavrilović was especially protective of her and soon became her great love Their romance later ended when Gavrilović left her for an actress Mica Hrvojić. She married a second time in 1908, but the marriage was also short ending on a painful note.

In 1939, she began a relationship with a clerk, Moris Pijade, some 20 years her younger. However, after German occupation of Serbia in 1941, as a Jew, Pijade was deported, apparently to the concentration camps of Sajmište and Dachau, and perished, despite her urging to Božidar Bećarević, one of the heads of the Belgrade police, to spare him.

Ultimately unhappy in her private life, she reclused to her house in Belgrade's neighborhood of Topčidersko Brdo, as a severe diabetic, living with her pets and a longtime maid and confidant, Magda.

=== Personality and public image ===
Though successful in dramatic roles, as well as in foreign stage productions where Stokić specifically excelled in soubrette roles, her highest artistic achievement occurred in character comedy with her irresistibly suggestive acting that included spontaneity, freshness of expression, vivid imagination, exuberant temperament, and dynamic spirit.

She was equally jovial in her private life and could be seen out and about living a bohemian life in Belgrade's kafanas, fraternizing with her, equally bohemian, male peers like Čiča Ilija Stanojević and Milan Gavrilović. When she organized a celebration of her 25 years of acting in Belgrade's bohemian quarter Skadarlija, fans from far and wide showed up, giving her presents that included cash, sacks full of coins, puppies in flower baskets, and war bonds. It is known that, even though she would not get a new role for over a year, she never complained. Publicity stunts include Žanka being a godmother to bear cubs at Belgrade Zoo.

== World War II ==
Stokić spent the war years depressed by illness and difficulty of acquiring insulin. She continued to act, appearing in comedy theatres Veseljaci and Centrala za humor, often playing a caricatured Pela the Washerwoman, a simple-hearted, blabby everyday woman. She was also active on Radio Belgrade in shows Veselo srpsko popodne and Šareno popodne, which were aired after the news and public announcements of the German city commandant. All those shows were, more-or-less, sponsored by Germans, to keep an appearance of normal life in occupied Belgrade.

== 1945 trial ==
After Germans were expelled and Belgrade was liberated by the Yugoslav Partisans and Red Army on October 20, 1944, new Communist authorities immediately started organizing trials for collaborators and Žanka got arrested. On February 3, 1945, in a humiliating revolutionary trial with a group of prostitutes, and being denied a lawyer, even a public defender, the Court for the crimes and violations against the national honor found her guilty for collaborationism with the occupational forces. Her punishment included 8 years of loss of national honor and community service, specifically, street sweeping. It is believed that due to the intervention of Mitra Mitrović, at the time wife of Milovan Đilas and a severe diabetic seizure during the trial, she escaped a worse fate as, according to the official statistics, 77 of her colleague actors were shot by the new government, including popular actors like Aleksandar Cvetković and Jovan Tanović.

In 1947 Žanka appealed the ruling admitting that she performed in theatre on her own free will because she needed money for the insulin, but that she was forced to appear on the radio by the Germans. She offered witnesses and testimonies that, during the war, she sheltered Koča Popović, a high ranking Communist operative, future foreign minister and Josip Broz Tito's deputy, but also Jews Samuil Pijade and the Flore family. She pleaded that the state allow her to perform again so that she wouldn't have to live on charity. Serbian justice minister Dušan Bratić suggested reducing her penalty saying, 'the defendant has been harmless to society for years’.

== Death ==
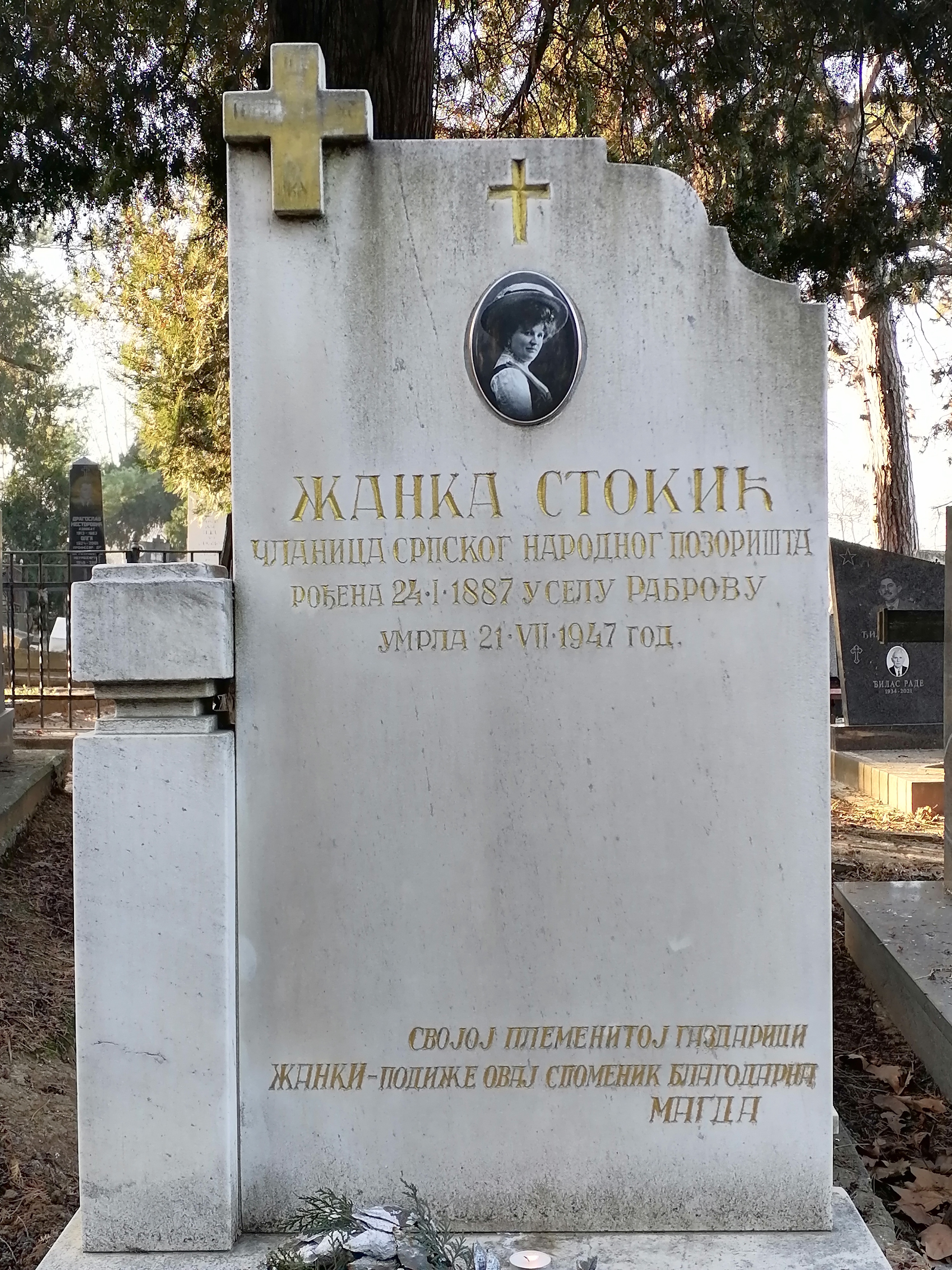

In the summer of 1947, before any official decision on her sentence, she was visited by Milivoje Živanović, one of the greatest Serbian actors, who told her that 'everything is forgiven'. Director Bojan Stupica, who was in charge of creating the Yugoslav drama theatre and making it the forerunner of modern theatre in Yugoslavia, was adamant to get Žanka for his company. After acquiring a permissions from the Agitprop of the Central Committee and from Radovan Zogović, chief propagandist of the Communist Party, Stupica personally visited her to tell her that she can start acting again. Tragically, three days after his visit and one night before Žanka was to appear on her first rehearsal, she died.

On the day when she was to be interred at the Topčider, thousands of people escorted her coffin, kneeling along the road where a bullock cart, with her casket on, passed to the cemetery. Her funeral turned into the silent protest against the newly established Communist government, so as some of the later funerals of the pre-war public personalities who fell out of favor during Communism, like politicians Vlada Ilić in 1952, or Lazar Marković in 1957. She asked for two songs to be sung at her funeral, Oj, Srbijo ("O, Serbia") and Oj, Moravo ("O, Morava"). Authorities allowed only the latter.

== Rehabilitation ==
NGO League for the protection of private property and human rights began process of rehabilitation in October 2006, soon joined in the effort by the National Theatre in Belgrade. On March 3, 2009, Belgrade's District Court officially rehabilitated her. In its ruling, the court determined that she was not politically active during the war and that her conviction was based on political and ideological reasons and not on the judicial ones. The court also established that, during the trial, she was deprived of some basic rights, like a lawyer or a defender.

== Žanka Stokić award ==
In 2001, on the celebration of her 60-years of acting, Mira Stupica, widow of Bojan Stupica and herself one of the greatest Serbian actresses, on stage publicly called for establishing the Velika Žanka award (Great Žanka), in honor of Žanka Stokić, pointing out that there are no appropriate awards for actresses in their prime, when they are too old for the debutant awards and still too young for the life-time awards. In 2002 it was announced that the new award will be established next year, under the name of Žanka Stokić award. The prize has been awarded yearly ever since, and Mira Stupica was the president for life of the jury (she died in 2016).

== In popular culture ==
In 1991 Radio Television Belgrade made a TV movie Smrt gospođe ministarke (Death of the cabinet minister’s wife). Directed by Sava Mrmak and written by Dušan Savković, it follows Žanka's life from the trial until her death. Fueled by the stellar performance of Svetlana Bojković as Žanka, drama gained a broad popularity, and was voted the best TV drama in the poll conducted on television's 50th anniversary.

She also was an inspiration for a biography "Žanka Stokić" by Petar Volk (1986) and for drama "Žanka" by Miodrag Ilić (2006)

In Rabrovo, which is, as historian Simo C. Ćirković noted, incorrectly regarded as her birthplace but nevertheless remains integral part of her biography, an annual theatrical festival Žanki u čast (In ‘Žanka's honor) is held, and on the 50th anniversary of her death, a monument to her was erected in the village.

In the early 1990s, a street in Belgrade's neighborhood of Senjak was named after her.
