= Katarina Žutić =

Serbian actress (born 1972)

- Born: 24 October 1972 (age 54); Belgrade, Serbia
- Occupations: Actress, musician
- Instrument: Bass guitar

Katarina Žutić (Serbian Cyrillic: Катарина Жутић; born 24 October 1972) is a Serbian actress.

== Biography ==
Žutić was born 24 October 1972, in Belgrade, Serbia. She graduated from the Faculty of Dramatic Arts, University of Arts in Belgrade, studying under professor Predrag Bajčetić. Her parents, Svetlana Bojković and Miloš Žutić, are also actors.

== Awards ==
- Award for best female role in Nevaljala Princeza, at the Children's Festival in Kotor, Montenegro.
- Carica Teodora award, for best female role in the movie Vizantijski Plavo, at a Film Festival in Niš.
- Award for best walk-on in the movie Sky Hook at a Film Festival in Niš.
- Vecernje Novosti award for best young actress at the 2005 Days of ComedyFestival, Jagodina.
- Award at the 2007 International Festival of the Theater For Kids, Banja Luka.
- Ćuran Award for her role in Krcmarica Mirandolina, at the 2007 Days of Comedy Festival, Jagodina.
- Award for best walk-on in Kazimir i Karolina, at the International Short Film Festival, Rijeka.
