= Milenko Zablaćanski =

Serbian actor, director, and screenwriter (1955-2008)

- Born: December 8, 1955; Bogatić, Serbia (Yugoslavia)
- Died: January 22, 2008 (aged 52); Belgrade, Serbia
- Burial place: Belgrade New Cemetery
- Occupations: Actor, director, and playwright
- Years active: 1980–2008
- Spouse: Snežana Vesković

Milenko Zablaćanski, (Serbian Cyrillic: Миленко Заблаћански), (8 December 1955 — 22 January 2008), was a Serbian actor, director, and screenwriter.

== Career ==
Zablaćanski graduated from the Faculty of Dramatic Arts (FDU) in Belgrade, studying under Ognjenka Milićević. He began his career in the Boško Buha Theatre and in 1985 he moved to the Terazije Theatre, where he played the lead role in many productions.

== Filmography ==
Year	Title	Role
1981	Ерогена зона	Моцин друг из војске
1981	Светозар Марковић	
1981	Седам секретара СКОЈ-а	
1982	Далеко небо	
1983	Переат	
1984	Игра о памћењу и умирању	
1984	Андрић и Гоја	
1985	Томбола	
1985	Црвена барака	
1987	The Misfit Brigade	херој из Бектовке
1988	Мала Нада	Миленце
1988	Нека чудна земља	гитариста
1988	Вук Караџић	Лазар Арсенијевић
1990	Народни посланик	адвокат Ивковић
1993–1994	Срећни људи	Ђорђе Ђорђевић Ђорђино
1994	Вуковар, једна прича	војник
1995–1996	Срећни људи 2	Ђорђе Ђорђевић Ђорђино
1996	Горе доле	
1997	Грозница суботње вечери	
1998–2001	Породично благо	Добривоје Кашиковић Миксер
2000	Добро вече, децо	
2000	А сад адио	Добривоје Кашиковић Миксер
2000	Зека, Црвенкапа и Лотар Матеус	директор ТВ станице
2001	Лола	Бане Глумац
2002	Класа 2002	обезбеђење
2002	Породично благо 2	Добривоје Кашиковић Миксер
2002	Ко чека дочека	
2003	Сироти мали хрчки 2010	Други тип из протокола
2004	Стижу долари	Ненад Неша Љутић
2005	Дангубе!	
2005–2006	Стижу долари 2	Ненад Неша Љутић
2006–2007	Бела лађа	Маринко Пантић
2007	Оно наше што некад бејаше	поручник Марјан
2008	Краљевина Србија	песник
2008	Бела лађа 2	Маринко Пантић

== Death ==
On 5 January 2008, Zablaćanski's vehicle was involved in a head-on collision. Zablaćanski received massive head injuries and was carried away unconscious to the Užice hospital. When his condition did not improve and he did not wake from a coma, he was transferred to the Military Medical Academy in Belgrade where he died on 22 January. He was buried on 25 January 2008 in the Alley of Distinguished Citizens in the New Cemetery, Belgrade.
