= Zoran Janković =

Zoran Janković may refer to:

- Zoran Janković (politician) (born 1953), Slovenian businessman and politician
- Zoran Janković (footballer) (born 1974), Serbian-born Bulgarian football manager and former player
- Zoran Janković (water polo) (1940–2002), Yugoslavian water polo player
- Zoran "Bajo" Janković, Macedonian musician best known as the bassist for Aleksandar Makedonski
