= Barking at the Stars =

- Directed by: Zdravko Šotra
- Screenplay by: Zdravko Šotra; Milovan Vitezović
- Based on: Lajanje na zvezde by Milovan Vitezović
- Produced by: Maksa Ćatović
- Starring: Dragan Mićanović; Nataša Tapušković; Nikola Simić
- Music by: Vojkan Borisavljević
- Release date: 1 June 1998
- Running time: 95 minutes
- Country: FR Yugoslavia
- Language: Serbian

Barking at the Stars (Serbian: Лајање на звезде, Lajanje na zvezde) is a 1998 Yugoslav film directed by Zdravko Šotra.

Although it was filmed during a decade of war and hardship in the former Yugoslavia, the film was overall praised for its wholesomeness, as it does not contain any swearing, nudity, or talk of politics.

== Plot ==
The story is told as a flashback. It was the year 1963 in the small fictional town of Moravski Karlovci. The action centres around the students in IV-2, the graduating class of the local high school. A boy whose nickname is Philosopher is developing feelings for his classmate, Danica. He's a lot smarter than other students, sometimes even smarter than his professors. There's also his best friend, who is trying to practice boxing for his big match in the capital, passionately trained by the P.E. teacher. In this story, everyone finds his/her soulmate, even the professors. Philosopher wants to win over Danica's heart, but he has a rival—his own older brother who appears to be cooler because he has a motorbike and earns money on his own. Danica tries hard to resist all the flirting and everything Philosopher says to her in an attempt to win her heart, but eventually, she can't fight back anymore. The class goes on an excursion to Montenegro with their homeroom teacher and along the way, Philosopher and Danica share their first kiss. Fast forward to the present, they're now married and have a son who is going to his prom, using his dad's old pick up lines to win a girl over. The movie ends with the legendary quote from Philosopher when he first confessed his feelings to Danica ("Kako Tanjug javlja, ja te volim"), and with Philosopher and Danica going out on their balcony and barking at the stars.

== Cast ==
- Dragan Mićanović - Mihajlo Knežević - Filozof
- Nataša Tapušković - Danica Janković
- Nikola Simić - Direktor
- Bata Živojinović - Božović
- Dragan Jovanović - Gradimir Stević
- Vesna Trivalić - Dana Jelinic
- Bogdan Diklić - Đuro Dragićević
- Aleksandar Berček - Slobodan Lazarević
- Nikola Đuričko - Milić Gavranić - Tupa
- Isidora Minić - Milena Koheza
- Nebojša Ilić - Bogoljub Maric
- Branimir Brstina - Nenad Lazicic / Nesa Kutuzov

== Production ==
The film was shot in Sremski Karlovci, with notable scenes featuring the Karlovci Gymnasium and "Four Lions" fountain, as well as in Belgrade and Montenegro.

Actor Nikola Đuričko nearly died during one filming of a scene where his character Milić Gavranić-Tupa is racing against the train. Wanting to make his racing scene as believable as possible, he ignored the crew's signal to get off the train tracks, and allowed the train to get closer to him before starting to run. He subsequently tripped and fell on the tracks, but was helped up by a nearby crew member, thereby avoiding serious injury or death.

== Film fan incident ==
In 2015, a 22-year-old man tried to recreate a scene from his favorite movie Barking at the Stars by running in front of a train, beating it and being hailed a hero. As he ran in front of the train, he tried to take a selfie to document the scene. He was killed instantly when the express train hit him at full speed in the village of Laćarak near the town of Sremska Mitrovica.
