= Stižu dolari =

Serbian television series

- Genre: Comedy
- Created by: Siniša Pavić
- Starring: Milenko Zablaćanski; Nela Mihailović; Aleksandar Berček; Dragan Jovanovic; Branka Pujić
- Countries of origin: Serbia and Montenegro
- Original language: Serbian
- No. of seasons: 2
- No. of episodes: 50

Production
- Executive producer: Mihailo Vukobratović
- Producer: Zoran Janković
- Cinematography: Ivan Kostić
- Editor: Lana Vukobratović
- Running time: 45 minutes
- Production company: Komuna Belgrade

Original release
- Network: Radio Television of Serbia
- Release: January 18, 2004 – June 18, 2006

Stižu dolari (Serbian: Стижу долари, lit. 'Dollars are Coming') is a Serbian comedy television series produced by Komuna Belgrade. It aired on Radio Television of Serbia from 2004 to 2006.

The series was directed by Mihailo Vukobratovic, with the script being written by Siniša Pavić and Ljiljana Pavić. It starred Predrag Smiljković, Milenko Zablaćanski, Nela Mihailović, Aleksandar Berček, Mirjana Karanović, Danilo Lazović, Branko Cvejić, Miloš Biković, and Dragan Jovanovic as main roles.

== Plot ==
The whole town is looking forward to the return of the American mafia, but they do not know that their hopes are in vain.

== Awards ==
The award for the best acting couple of the year, chosen by the readers of TV Novosti, was given to Nela Mihailović for the role of Živana Ljutić and Milenko Zablacanski for the role of Nenad Ljutić at the Niš Film Festival in 2006.
