= Bata Paskaljević =

Serbian actor

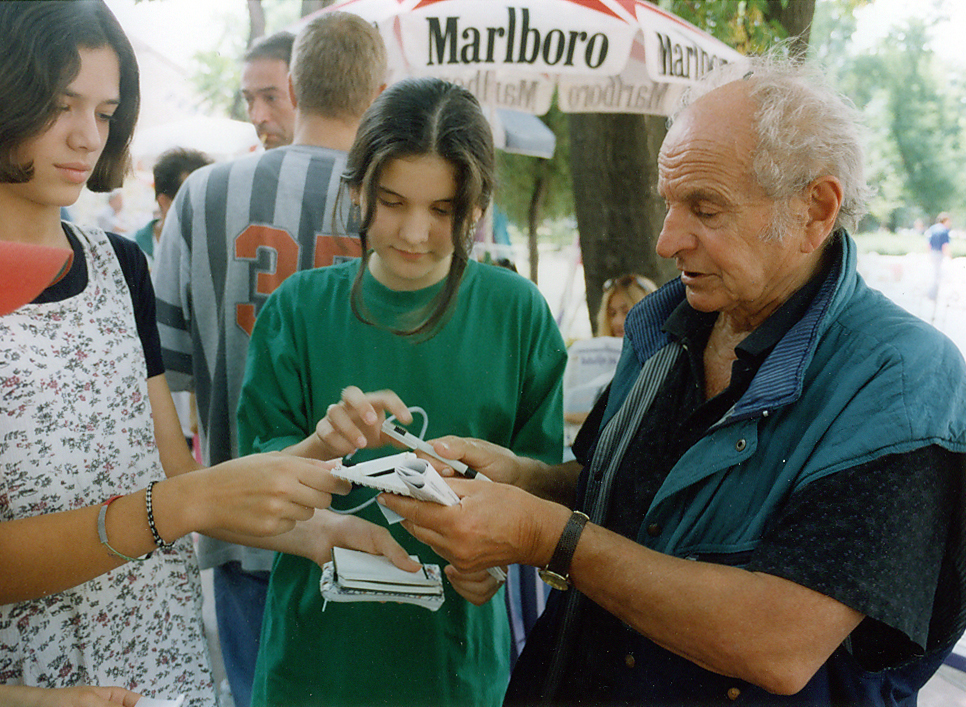
Paskaljević signing autographs in 1997 at the Filmski susreti festival in Niš.

Mihajlo "Bata" Paskaljević (Serbian Cyrillic: Михајло "Бата" Паскаљевић; 14 January 1923 – 26 January 2004) was a Serbian stage, film, and television actor, permanent member of the Belgrade Drama Theatre since 1950.

Born in Požarevac (at the time Kingdom of Yugoslavia), he spent his childhood and youth years in Kruševac.

Most of his stage and film career were comic roles. His first dramatic role was that of the father of a protagonist Olgica in the 1987 film Reflections by Goran Marković, for which he received the award for the best male supporting role at Niš Film Festival.

He died in Belgrade, Serbia and Montenegro.
