= Nikola Đuričko =

Serbian actor (born 1974)

- Никола Ђуричко
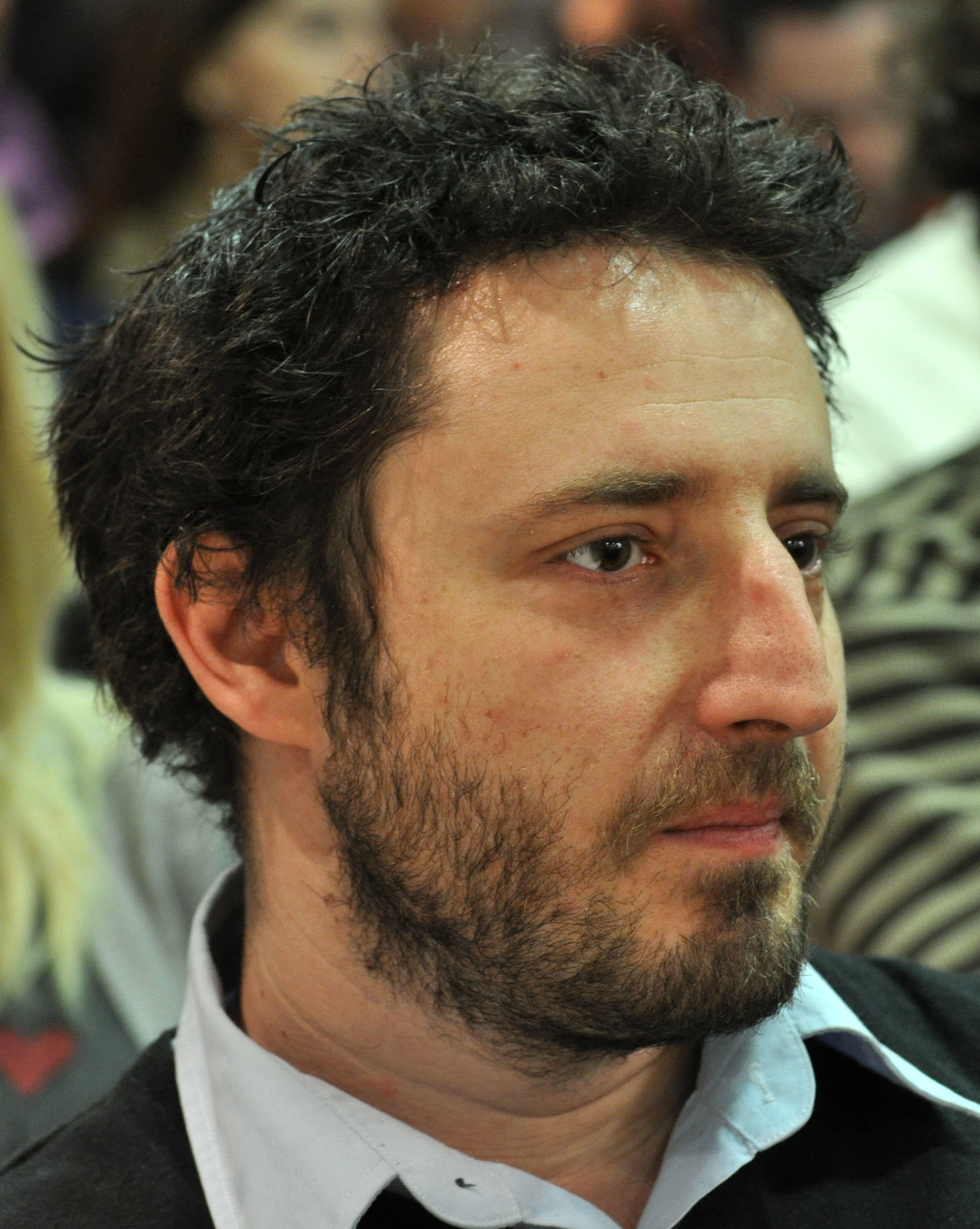
- Đuričko in 2011
- Born: 9 July 1974 (age 52); Belgrade, SR Serbia, SFR Yugoslavia
- Citizenship: Serbian
- Education: Faculty of Dramatic Arts, University of Arts in Belgrade
- Occupation: Actor
- Years active: 1980–present
- Known for: Yuri Ismaylov (Stranger Things) Darko (In the Land of Blood and Honey)
- Spouse: Ljiljana Nešić (m. 2002)
- Children: 2
- Relatives: Tomanija Đuričko (grandmother)

Nikola Ðuričko (Serbian Cyrillic: Никола Ђуричко; born 9 July 1974) is a Serbian actor active in film, television, and in theater.

== Biography ==
Ðuričko was born in Belgrade, SR Serbia, SFR Yugoslavia and graduated from the Belgrade University of Arts School of Dramatic Arts. His first notable role was in 1989, in the film Poslednji krug u Monci.

In 1991, he played Djura in the play Dawn in East by Gordan Mihić.

On 7 June 2004 Ðuričko married a woman he had met earlier that year on the set of The Cordon, where she worked as a production assistant and he had a leading role. Together they have a daughter and a son.

He has received the Zoran Radmilović Award (2011), Miloš Žutić Award (2015), and the award for Best Actor at the FEST International Film Festival (2021).

In late 2019, he moved from Serbia to Los Angeles with his family. As of 2022, he remained based in Los Angeles.

== Selected filmography ==
=== Film ===
Year	English title	Native title	Role	Language	Notes
1998	Barking at the Stars	Лајање на звезде Lajanje na zvezde	Milić Gavranić - Tupa	Serbian	
2001	Thunderbirds	Муње; Munje!	Gojko Sisa	Serbian	Also released internationally as Dudes
2001	Boomerang	Бумеранг; Bumerang	Stampedo	Serbian	
2001	Natasha	Наташа; Nataša	Marko	Serbian	
2002	T.T. Syndrome	Т.Т. Синдром; T.T. Sindrom	Sale	Serbian	
2002	Frozen Stiff	Мртав 'ладан Mrtav 'ladan	Limeni	Serbian	
2003	Yu			Serbian	
2004	Mirage	Илузија (Iluzija)	Paris	Macedonian	
2004	Take a Deep Breath	Диши дубоко Diši duboko	Bojan	Serbian	
2004	When I Grow Up, I'll Be a Kangaroo	Кад порастем бићу Кенгур; Kad porastem biću Kengur	Kengur	Serbian	
2004	The Robbery of the Third Reich	Пљачка Трећег рајха Pljačka Trećeg rajha	Kalauz	Serbian	
2006	Seven and a Half	Седам и по Sedam i po	Simke	Serbian	
2009	Technotise: Edit & I	Технотајз: Едит и ја Technotis: Edit i Ja	Bojan	Serbian	
2010	Montevideo, God Bless You!	Монтевидео, Бог те видео! Montevideo, Bog te video!	Živković	Serbian	Also released internationally as Montevideo, Taste of a Dream
2011	In the Land of Blood and Honey	U zemlji krvi i meda	Darko	Bosnian	
2012	Death of a Man in the Balkans	Смрт човека на Балкану; Smrt čoveka na Balkanu	Real-estate broker	Serbian	
2012	Children of Sarajevo	Djeca	Tarik	Bosnian	
2013	World War Z		Captain of "Belarus Airlines"	English	
2023	The Machine		Igor	English	

=== Television ===
Year	Title	Role	Language	Notes
1994–1995; 2013–2014	Otvorena vrata	Vojislav Jakovljević "Vojkan"	Serbian	60 episodes
2007–2008	Vratiće se rode	Predrag Švabić "Švaba"	Serbian	25 episodes
2014–2020	Hollands Hoop	Sasha Milos (Sasha's father)	Dutch	19 episodes
2015	Legends	Tamir Zakayev	English	9 episodes
2018	Informer	Lorik Gramos	English	4 episodes
2021	For All Mankind	Stepan Petrovich Alexseev	English	2 episodes
2022	Stranger Things	Yuri Ismaylov	English	6 episodes
