= List of Serbian submissions for the Academy Award for Best International Feature Film =

Best International Feature Film submissions from Serbia
- Formerly called: FR Yugoslavia (1994–2003); Serbia and Montenegro (2003–2006)

Highlights
- Debut: 1994
- Submissions: 33
- Nominations: none
- Oscar winners: none

Serbia (Note: From 1992 to 2006, Serbia and Montenegro were united into a single state, known from 1992 to 2003 as the Federal Republic of Yugoslavia and from 2003 to 2006 as the State Union of Serbia and Montenegro. This article also includes submissions made during those years by "FR Yugoslavia" and "Serbia and Montenegro.") has submitted films for the Academy Award for Best International Feature Film (Note: The category was previously named the Academy Award for Best Foreign Language Film, but this was changed to the Academy Award for Best International Feature Film in April 2019, after the Academy deemed the word "Foreign" to be outdated.) since 1991. The award is handed out annually by the United States Academy of Motion Picture Arts and Sciences to a feature-length motion picture produced outside the United States that contains primarily non-English dialogue.

As of 2026, Serbia has submitted thirty-two films, but none of them were nominated.

== Submissions ==
The Academy of Motion Picture Arts and Sciences has invited the film industries of various countries to submit their best film for the Academy Award for Best International Feature Film since 1956. The International Feature Film Committee oversees the process and reviews all the submitted films. Following this, they vote via secret ballot to determine the five nominees for the award.

Serbia is formerly a part of Yugoslavia, which was nominated in the category six times between 1959 and 1992, three of these films were directed by Serbian filmmakers. Between 1994 and 2003, the country was officially named FR Yugoslavia. While, between 2003 and 2006, the country was officially named Serbia and Montenegro. Since 2007, the country is officially named Serbia.

The Trap (2007) advanced to the December shortlist, but it was not nominated.

Below is a list of the films that have been submitted by Serbia and its predecessor states for review by the Academy for the award by year and the respective Academy Awards ceremony.

Year (Ceremony)	Film title used in nomination	Original title	Director(s)	Result
As FR Yugoslavia (until 2003)
1994 (67th)	Vukovar Poste Restante	Вуковар, једна прича	Boro Drašković	Not nominated
1995 (68th)	Underground	Подземље	Emir Kusturica	Not nominated
1996 (69th)	Pretty Village, Pretty Flame	Лепа села лепо горе	Srđan Dragojević	Not nominated
1997 (70th)	Three Summer Days	Три летња дана	Mirjana Vukomanović	Not nominated
1998 (71st)	Powder Keg	Буре барута	Goran Paskaljević	Not nominated
1999 (72nd)	The White Suit	Бело одело	Lazar Ristovski	Not nominated
2000 (73rd)	Sky Hook	Небеска удица	Ljubiša Samardžić	Not nominated
2001 (74th)	War Live	Рат уживо	Darko Bajić	Not nominated
2002 (75th)	Labyrinth	Лавиринт	Miroslav Lekić	Not nominated
As Serbia and Montenegro (2003–2006)
2003 (76th)	The Professional	Професионалац	Dušan Kovačević	Not nominated
2004 (77th)	Goose Feather	Јесен стиже, дуњо моја	Ljubiša Samardžić	Not nominated
2005 (78th)	Midwinter Night's Dream	Сан зимске ноћи	Goran Paskaljević	Not nominated
As Serbia (since 2006)
2006 (79th)	Tomorrow Morning	Сутра ујутро	Oleg Novković	Not nominated
2007 (80th)	The Trap	Клопка	Srdan Golubović	Made shortlist
2008 (81st)	The Tour	Турнеја	Goran Marković	Not nominated
2009 (82nd)	St. George Shoots the Dragon	Свети Георгије убива аждаху	Srđan Dragojević	Not nominated
2010 (83rd)	Solemn Promise	Беса	Srđan Karanović	Not nominated
2011 (84th)	Montevideo, God Bless You!	Монтевидео, Бог те видео	Dragan Bjelogrlić	Not nominated
2012 (85th)	When Day Breaks	Кад сване дан	Goran Paskaljević	Not nominated
2013 (86th)	Circles	Кругови	Srdan Golubović	Not nominated
2014 (87th)	See You in Montevideo	Монтевидео, видимо се!	Dragan Bjelogrlić	Not nominated
2015 (88th)	Enclave	Енклава	Goran Radovanović	Not nominated
2016 (89th)	Train Driver's Diary	Дневник машиновође	Miloš Radović	Not nominated
2017 (90th)	Requiem for Mrs. J.	Реквијем за госпођу Ј.	Bojan Vuletić	Not nominated
2018 (91st)	Offenders	Изгредници	Dejan Zečević	Not nominated
2019 (92nd)	King Petar of Serbia	Краљ Петар Први	Petar Ristovski	Not nominated
2020 (93rd)	Dara of Jasenovac	Дара из Јасеновца	Predrag Antonijević	Not nominated
2021 (94th)	Oasis	Оаза	Ivan Ikić	Not nominated
2022 (95th)	Darkling	Mrak	Dušan Milić	Not nominated
2023 (96th)	The Duke and the Poet	Што се боре мисли моје	Milorad Milinković	Not nominated
2024 (97th)	Russian Consul	Ruski konzul	Miroslav Lekić	Not nominated
2025 (98th)	Sun Never Again	Sunce nikad više	David Jakovljević	Not nominated
2026 (99th)	Wanderlust	Izlet	Nenad Pavlović	Pending

== See also ==
- List of Kosovan submissions for the Academy Award for Best International Feature Film
- List of Montenegrin submissions for the Academy Award for Best International Feature Film
- List of Yugoslav submissions for the Academy Award for Best International Feature Film
- List of Academy Award winners and nominees for Best International Feature Film
- List of Academy Award-winning foreign language films
- Cinema of Serbia
