= St. George Shoots the Dragon =

2009 Serbian film

Saint George Slays the Dragon
- Directed by: Srđan Dragojević
- Written by: Dušan Kovačević
- Produced by: Dušan Kovačević; Lazar Ristovski; Srđan Dragojević; Milko Josifov; Biljana Prvanović
- Starring: Lazar Ristovski; Milutin Milošević; Nataša Janjić; Bora Todorović; Dragan Nikolić; Milena Dravić; Zoran Cvijanović; Branislav Lečić
- Cinematography: Dušan Joksimović
- Music by: Aleksandar Ranđelović
- Distributed by: Sinears (Serbia); Wild Bunch (globally)
- Release date: March 11, 2009 (Serbia)
- Running time: 150 min.
- Language: Serbian
- Budget: €5 million (estimated)
- Box office: $325,265 (Serbia)

St. George Slays the Dragon (Serbian: Свети Георгије убива аждаху / Sveti Georgije ubiva aždahu) is a Serbian war drama film directed by Srđan Dragojević and written by Dušan Kovačević. It was premiered on March 11, 2009.

With a budget of around €5 million, it was one of the most expensive Serbian film productions to date. Some of the funds have been donated by the governments of Serbia (€1.55 million) and Republika Srpska (€750,000) who deemed the movie to be of national importance.

Kovačević's script is based on his 1984 theater play that was staged to great success in Belgrade's Atelje 212 and Novi Sad's Serbian National Theatre.

== Plot ==
The film starts with the Kingdom of Serbia, part of the Balkan League, battling the remaining Ottoman forces during the First Balkan War in 1912 when a Serbian force with soldiers Gavrilo and Đorđe in command is ambushed. Gavrilo is severely wounded and loses an arm in the attack but Đorđe saves him. The story then moves 2 years forward with the outbreak of World War I in 1914; namely, the crucial Battle of Cer, first allied victory in World War I. It is largely set in and around a small village by the Sava river near Serbia's border with Austria-Hungary.

The village is deeply divided between able-bodied men that are potential army recruits and the many disabled veterans from the previous Balkan Wars; there is bitter animosity between the two groups, who do not intermingle much with each other even though they live in the same village.

The movie's central theme is a love triangle between the village gendarme Đorđe, his wife Katarina and the young disabled war veteran Gavrilo who was previously engaged to Katarina before he went to war and lost his arm in battle, and with the arm partly also his lust for life. Even though Katarina married Đorđe in the meantime, she still has affection for Gavrilo, which is a source of friction between the two.

At the onset of World War I, all able-bodied men in the village are recruited for combat. Left in the village are only women, children and disabled veterans from previous Balkan wars. Rumours start circulating that the invalids in the village are trying to take advantage of the situation by making their moves on the women in the village – the wives and sisters of the recruited men. These rumours reach the villagers at the frontlines, and in order to prevent mutiny the army staff decides to recruit the invalids as well and send them to the front line. Meanwhile, the Serbian army suffers heavy losses at cer and is desperate for reinforcements. Along with the invalids, they launch a suicide assault on the Austro Hungarian lines which claims the lives of all the invalids except Gavrilo. They eventually break through the austro Hungarian lines but both Gavrilo and Dorde are killed while attempting a last stand. The film ends with some villagers inspecting the dead Serbian and Austro Hungarian soldiers and find Gavrilo and Dorde lying dead next to each other, symbolising that they had finally forgiven each other.

== Cast ==
- Lazar Ristovski – Đorđe Žandar
- Milutin Milošević – Gavrilo Vuković
- Radoslav Milošević – Gavrilo Vuković (before losing his left arm)
- Nataša Janjić – Katarina
- Bora Todorović – Aleksa Vuković
- Zoran Cvijanović – Mile Vuković
- Dragan Nikolić – Priest
- Boris Milivojević – Rajko Pevac
- Branislav Lečić – Captain Tasić
- Mladen Andrejević – Teacher Mićun
- Srđan Timarov – Mikan
- Predrag Vasić – Vane the orphan
- Bojan Žirović – Žoja
- Milica Ostojić – First sister
- Milena Dravić – Aunt
- Milena Predić – Jelena
- Slobodan Ninković – Ninko Belotić
- Stefan Danailov – Minta Ciganin
- Duško Mazalica – Gavrilo Princip
- Dejan Zorić – Dojko Žandar
- – Ferdinand of Austria
- – Duchess Sophie

== Production ==
Producers sought funding twice, in 1998 and in 2001, until majority state funding was secured in 2007.

The movie's production company was an ad hoc legal entity called "Sveti Georgije ubiva aždahu" – a one-off company registered and established for the purposes of making this film. Listed as its founders and owners were the following businesses: Zillion Film (production company owned by Lazar Ristovski), Yodi Movie Craftsman (owned by Zoran Cvijanović and Milko Josifov), Delirium Film (owned by Srđan Dragojević), and Maslačak Film (owned by Biljana Prvanović). Additional production entities involved were Oskar Film from Banja Luka and Camera from Bulgaria.

Besides the governments of Serbia (under prime minister Koštunica and cultural minister Dragan Kojadinović) and Republika Srpska (under prime minister Milorad Dodik) that donated a total of €2.25 million, the movie's additional funding came from Eurimages fund that contributed €400,000, Serbian Ministry of Culture, and the Executive Council of the Autonomous Province of Vojvodina.

The movie had 92 shooting days (50 of them night shoots) throughout the summer and fall of 2007 on locations in Serbia, Republika Srpska (Bosnia and Herzegovina), and Bulgaria. The shooting began on 18 July 2007 and wrapped on 5 December 2007. For the shooting in Serbia, an entire village was built in early 20th century style in South Banat District near Deliblatska Peščara with full and detailed interiors created by cinematographer Miljen "Kreka" Kljaković. In Republika Srpska, the shooting took place in Omarska near Prijedor where the Battle of Cer was recreated.

=== Controversy ===
Originally cast for the role of young war cripple Gavrilo was Sergej Trifunović. However, as the film was about to go into production, a row over creative issues erupted between him and Lazar Ristovski, one of the film's producers who also plays the role of Đorđe the gendarme. This resulted in Trifunović effectively being fired from the movie and young Milutin Milošević cast instead for the role of Gavrilo.

Towards the end of shooting, the movie's cinematographer Miljen "Kreka" Kljaković walked off the set, reportedly over not being paid in full the agreed upon amount in his contract.

== Reaction ==
The movie provoked a reaction from the opposition Serbian Progressive Party (SNS) that accused it of "falsifying facts". Dramaturgist Radoslav Pavlović, an SNS member, complained about the historical liberties taken by the film's creators, namely the depiction of the crippled veterans being recruited for battle - an event of which there's no historical proof.

Historian Predrag J. Marković listed the film as an example of "auto-chauvinism", a term he described as "the hatred of one's own people". Marković added: "Terrible damage has been inflicted with this project, which ate up enormous resources of both Serbia and Republika Srpska in order to portray Serbian soldiers as freakish monsters and Serb people as immoral scum. This may be legitimate under the licence of artistic freedom, but it's unfathomable that the state would financially support a film like that. It's another example that when it comes to us (the Serbs), the only lasting ideologies are stupidity and negligence".

== Critical reception ==
=== Serbia ===
Released in mid March 2009 in Serbia and Republika Srpska (March 11 in Belgrade, March 12 in Banja Luka, and March 13 in Niš) to much media coverage, the movie received mostly lukewarm reviews. Many of the reviewers underscored the opinion that the finished product failed to live up to the hype that surrounded it.

After two weeks of theatrical release, the film sold 67,032 admission tickets in Serbia. By the end of its theatrical run in Serbia, the film sold 125,000 admission tickets, grossing $325,265 in the country, all of which was far less than expected.

=== Other ===
Subsequent Western critical reviews have been a bit more positive.

After seeing it at the 2009 Montreal World Film Festival, Variety's Dennis Harvey penned a lukewarm review, somewhat praising Dragojević for "directing the noisy, sprawling tale in colorful, confident fashion, at times recalling the rambunctious grotesquerie of Emir Kusturica's Underground (a more successful Kovačević adaptation, also starring Ristovski)" while pointing out that the whole thing still "seems schematic rather than felt" and identifying the movie's biggest problem to be its central romance, which is "neither convincing nor appealing".

Stephen Farber writing for Reuters, says, "As the film morphs into a penetrating anti-war drama, it becomes considerably more potent. Director Srđan Dragojevic, who made Pretty Village, Pretty Flame in 1996, demonstrates undeniable talent. The battle scenes capture the chaos and brutality of trench warfare, and the finale builds a mournful power. Cinematography is rich, and the score adds to the movie's impact. Although it's easy to grow impatient during St. George's early scenes, the haunting conclusion stays with you."

The film was selected as the Serbian entry for the Best Foreign Language Film at the 82nd Academy Awards, but it did not make the final shortlist.

== Notes ==
- The movie St. George Shoots the Dragon is based on a highly acclaimed theatre play of the same name written in 1984 by Dušan Kovačević, who also wrote the movie's screenplay.
- Dušan Kovačević claims that the movie is based on a true story, allegedly told to him by his grandfather Cvetko Kovačević who, as a young boy at the onset of World War I, purportedly transported wounded and killed soldiers with an oxcart to a field hospital set up near the city of Šabac during the Battle of Cer. However, there is no historical proof for Kovačević's claims that disabled people had been recruited and sent to the frontlines in Serbia during the First World War.
- The working English title of the movie was a literal translation of the Serbian title; St. George Slays the Dragon. It was subsequently altered to reflect a scene where one character calls for Saint George to shoot at and sink an Austrian patrol boat on the Sava river.
- Zoran Tucić, storyboard artist of the film, is the notable Serbian and Yugoslav graphic novel author, architect and illustrator.

== TV miniseries ==
Radio Television of Serbia will broadcast a six-part TV miniseries based on the movie after the movie premiere, as part of marking the 90th anniversary of the end of World War I.

== See also ==
- List of most expensive Serbian films
- List of submissions to the 82nd Academy Awards for Best Foreign Language Film
- List of Serbian submissions for the Academy Award for Best Foreign Language Film
