= Vratiće se rode =

- Series logo
- Created by: Dragan Bjelogrlić; Goran Bjelogrlić; Branimir Brstina
- Starring: Dragan Bjelogrlić; Nikola Đuričko; Srđan Todorović; Mira Banjac
- Country of origin: Serbia
- No. of episodes: 25

Production
- Executive producers: Dragan Bjelogrlić; Goran Bjelogrlić; Aneta Ivanović; Svetlana Drinjaković
- Running time: 45 minutes

Original release
- Network: B92
- Release: November 9, 2007 – June 6, 2008

Vratiće se rode (Serbian Cyrillic: Вратиће се роде, lit. 'The Storks Will Return') is a Serbian television series. Broadcast on B92 television in Serbia, it premiered on November 9, 2007. The series is directed by Goran Gajić and written by Nikola Pejaković (12 episodes) along with Ranko Božić (9 episodes) while 4 episodes were co-written between the two of them. It is produced by Cobra Films (a production company owned by the Bjelogrlić brothers) and the Adrenalin production house.

It consists of 25 episodes, each lasting 45 minutes with the exception of the introductory and the last episodes, which lasted 90 minutes. Placed in a primetime 9:00 pm slot on Fridays, the series quickly achieved high viewership; its premiere was watched by 2.6 million viewers in Serbia.

In addition to Serbia, in early 2008 Vratiće se rode was also shown on two stations in Bosnia and Herzegovina—Federalna televizija (Fridays at 8:00 pm from January 18, 2008) and RTRS (Saturdays at 8:00 pm from January 19, 2008)—as well as in Macedonia on A1 Television. Since February 4, 2008, it has also been shown in Montenegro on TV IN, which placed it in an 8.00 pm time slot on Mondays. On March 5, 2008, it premiered in Croatia on Nova TV, which originally placed it in a 9:40 pm timeslot on Wednesdays, however its time slot and day of airing was changed around frequently.

After the first season, the series had a two-part New Year's special aired on January 1 and 2, 2009, called Rode u magli (Storks in the Mist), followed by a possible second season. The two-episode special was written by Miloš Radović.

The series follows the exploits of a couple of Belgrade petty criminals nicknamed Ekser and Švaba. Each with his own set of emotional and financial issues, they look to rectify their latest problems when Švaba unexpectedly inherits a house from a deceased relative in the Banat village of Baranda.

== Cast ==
- Nikola Đuričko as Predrag Švabić a.k.a. Švaba
- Dragan Bjelogrlić as Aleksandar Vrancov a.k.a. Ekser
- Srđan Todorović as Duško Krtola a.k.a. Dule Pacov
- Mirjana Karanović as Radmila Švabić
- Boris Komnenić as Rodoljub Švabić
- Mira Banjac as Ružica Sinđelić (Baka Ruža)
- Branimir Brstina as Milenko Miletin
- Goran Radaković as Krunoslav Mišić a.k.a. Krlja
- Ljubomir Bandović as Zaviša Antić a.k.a. Ajnštajn or Aki
- Bojan Dimitrijević as Ivan Pančić a.k.a. Pikac
- Nada Šargin as Marina Jović
- Nikola Kojo as Batrić
- Vanja Milačić as Milanka, Batrić's secretary
- Miodrag Radovanović as Deša Inhof
- Radoslav Milenković as Ratko
- Vesna Trivalić as Dušanka
- Aleksandra Janković as Jadranka
- Dragan Petrović as Rev. Milorad Karaklajić
- Velimir Životić as Trifun Anastasijević, attorney-at-law
- Vojin Ćetković as Vražalić, real-estate developer
- Darko Tomović as Stolović, the deputy cabinet minister
- Branislav Lečić as Pera Vulin
- Novak Bilbija as Bora Vulin
- Gordana Đurđević as Angelina Vulin, Bora's wife
- Sanja Radišić as Nadica Vulin
- Marina Vodeničar as Slavica Vulin
- Miodrag Krivokapić as Sima
- Sonja Savić as Darinka, Sima's wife
- Saša Petrović as Bosanac
- Radmila Smiljanić as Vidosava
- Ljubčo Lazareski as Miki Nosonja
- Mirjana Joković as Sanja Gajić, Ekser's ex
- Aleksandar Srećković as Babun
- Mira Furlan as Jagoda Miletin
- Dragan Nikolić as Mutavi
- Nebojša Glogovac as Pera's and Bora's father
- Đorđe Đuričko as Svetozar "Toza" Stefanović
- Vladica Milosavljević as Branka
- Milan Marić as Dule's gangster
