= Boris Milivojević =

Serbian actor

- Борис Миливојевић
- Born: 26 November 1971 (age 54); Belgrade, SFR Yugoslavia
- Education: Faculty of Dramatic Arts
- Alma mater: University of Arts in Belgrade
- Occupation: Actor
- Years active: 1983–present

Boris Milivojević (Serbian Cyrillic: Борис Миливојевић; born 26 November 1971) is a Serbian actor. Since his debut in 1983, Milivojević has garnered critical and commercial success for his roles in theatre and film. He has had lead roles in high-profile Serbian films, including Munje! (2001), When I Grow Up, I'll Be a Kangaroo (2004), The Red Colored Grey Truck (2005), We Are Not Angels 3: Rock & Roll Strike Back (2006), The Fourth Man (2007), St. George Shoots the Dragon (2009) and Monument to Michael Jackson (2014), and has composed a wide palette of critically acclaimed theatre roles in Hamlet, Timon of Athens, King Lear, Macbeth, Antigone and Noises Off! in theatres in Eastern Europe.

He is a recipient of numerous accolades for his activity in Serbian film, theatre and television, including a Zoran Radmilović Award, two Ardalion Awards, three Serbian Oscars of Popularity, and a Golden Arena for Best Actor nomination.

== Biography ==
Milivojević was born in Belgrade to Serbian parents Radiša and Bojana Milivojević. He began his career in 1983 with supporting roles in Mahovina na asfaltu and Idi mi, dođi mi. His first critically defined role was as protagonist Tungi in Zaboravljeni.

During the nineties, he was notable for memorable supporting characters in films including The Black Bomber (1992), Pretty Village, Pretty Flame (1996) and The Dagger (1999). In 2016, he performed in HNK Zagreb as Guildenstern in Hamlet.

He received a Miloš Žutić Award nomination for his Shakespearean interpretation of Edgar in the Branislav Zeremski-directed version of King Lear in 2014, and a Zoran Radmilović Award for his role as Macbeth in Macbeth in 2017. For his portrayal of and Mare in Munje! (2001), he received a Golden Arena for Best Actor nomination.

Milivojević is active within reality television, appearing in the first season of the Serbian version of Your Face Sounds Familiar, where he qualified for the finals and reached 4th place out of 10; and hosting the quiz show Zlatni krug from 2015 to 2018.

He is also prominent within voice work in Serbian movie dubs. He voiced protagonist Jovan Vu in the 2009 Serbian-based animated film Technotise: Edit & I, and has voiced Puss in Boots in the Serbian dub of the Shrek franchise, Mike Wazowski in the Serbian Monsters Inc. films, King Julien in the Serbian Madagascar films, Grand Master Oogway in the Serbian Kung Fu Panda film series and Ed the hyena in the Serbian The Lion King, among other roles. He did not reprise his role as Puss in Boots in the dub of the 2011 Academy Award-nominated spinoff, with the character being voiced by colleague and friend Marko Živić in the sequel feature.

== Filmography ==
=== Film roles ===
Year	Title	Role	Notes
1983	Mahovina na asfaltu	Ljuba	Minor role
1983	Idi mi, dođi mi	Miša	Supporting role
1986	Razgovori stari	Borko	Lead role
1987	Waitapu	Zoran More	Lead role
1988	Zaboravljeni	Tungi	Lead role
1992	The Black Bomber	Prki	Supporting role
1996	Pretty Village, Pretty Flame	Ali the Muslim	Supporting role
1999	The Dagger	Adil Osmanović	Supporting role
1999	Nož	Adis	Lead role
1999	Ljubav, ženidba i udadba	Boris	Lead role
2000	Sky Hook	Bolid	Supporting role
2000	The Land of Love, Truth and Freedom	Boris	Supporting role
2001	Munje!	Mare	Lead role
2001	Natasha	Jezdi	Supporting role
2002	Rođen je Nebojša	Don	Cameo
2002	Lisice Film	Andrej	Lead role
2003	Svi kamioni crvene boje	Mladen	Lead role
2003	Black Gruya	Bole	Lead role
2004	Goose Feather	Enzo the Gipsy	Supporting role
2004	When I Grow Up, I'll Be a Kangaroo	Somi	Lead role
2005	The Balkan Roulette	Sami	Lead role
2005	The Red Colored Grey Truck	Ratko	Lead role
2006	We Are Not Angels 3: Rock & Roll Strike Back	Vlaho	Lead role
2007	The Fourth Man	Mafijas	Lead role
2007	Black Gruya and the Stone of Wisdom	Bole	Lead role
2007	Agi i Ema	Dragan	Minor role
2008	Bledi mesec	Norm	Cameo
2008	Citalja za Eskobara	Pavle	Supporting role
2009	Technotise: Edit & I	Jovan Vu	Voice role; lead role
2009	St. George Shoots the Dragon	Rajko Pevac	Lead role
2010	Vladan	Branislav	Cameo
2011	The Parade	Borna	Supporting role
2012	Žena	Ukino	Minor role
2013	Spidi Gonsales	Spidi	Cameo
2014	Monument to Michael Jackson	Marko	Lead role
2014	Jednaki	Vojislav	Lead role
2015	Alaska	Chapi	Lead role
2016	Helena	Boris	Lead role
2017	Psi laju, vetar nosi	Razvigor	Lead role
2018	Walker	Jovica	Cameo
2019	Four Roses	Beli	Lead role
2019	Taxi Blues	Astronaut	Lead role
2021	Vikend s caletom	Bambus	Post-production

=== Television roles ===
Year	Title	Role	Notes
1986-1987	Smešne i druge priče	Branko	Supporting role; 6 episodes
1986-1989	16 puta Bojan	Bojan	Lead role; 20 episodes
1987	Soba 405	Boca	Supporting role; 3 episodes
1988	Vuk Karadžić	Sava Karadžić	Supporting role, 15 episodes
2002-2005	Lisice	Andrej	Lead role
2009-2011	The Myth of Sisyphus	Hades	Lead role; 17 episodes
2009-2013	Žene sa Dedinja	Bogi	Supporting role; 10 episodes
2010-2017	Veče sa Ivanom Ivanovićem	Himself	Guest; 6 episodes
2013	Tvoje lice zvuči poznato	Himself; Magnifico; Đorđe Balašević; Tina Turner; Elvis Presley; Ivica Dačić; Momčilo Bajagić; Tony Cetinski; Ana Kokić; MC Hammer; Željko Joksimović; Seka Aleksić; Miodrag Kostić; Paul McCartney	Contestant
2014-2019	Zlatni Krug	Himself	Host
2017-2019	Psi laju, vetar nosi	Razvigor	Lead role, 24 episodes
2018–present	Šifra: Despot	Cifra	20 episodes
2018-2019	Besa	Miša	15 episodes
2019	Ujak: Novi Horizont	Stole	3 episodes
2019–present	Žigosani u reketu	Tesa	13 episodes
2020	Močvara	Goran the Bartender	3 episodes

=== Serbian movie voice dubs ===
Year	Title	Role
2002	The Lion King	Ed
2003	Finding Nemo	Gill
2003	Monsters, Inc.	Mike Wazowski
2004	Shrek 2	Puss in Boots
2004	The Incredibles	Edna Mode
2005	Chicken Little	Mayor Turkey Lurkey
2005	Madagascar	King Julien
2005	The Jungle Book	Bagheera
2005	Home on the Range	Lucky Jack
2006	Cars	Mater
2006	The Wild	Kazar
2007	Shrek the Third	Puss in Boots
2007	Bee Movie	Mooseblood
2007	The Simpsons Movie	Principal Skinner; Chief Wiggum; Moe Szyslak; Professor Frink
2008	Horton Hears a Who!	Horton the Elephant
2008	Kung Fu Panda	Grand Master Oogway
2008	Madagascar: Escape 2 Africa	King Julien
2009	The Princess and the Frog	Ray
2010	Shrek Forever After	Puss in Boots
2010	Beauty and the Beast	Le Fou
2011	Cars 2	Mater
2011	Rango	Ambrose
2011	Kung Fu Panda 2	Grand Master Oogway
2012	Madagascar 3: Europe's Most Wanted	King Julien
2013	Monsters University	Mike Wazowski
2014	The Nut Job 2	Surly
2016	Kung Fu Panda 3	Grand Master Oogway
2016	Zootopia	Mr. Big
2016	Finding Dory	Gill
2016	The Angry Birds Movie	Chuck
2017	Cars 3	Mater
2017	The Nut Job 2	Surly
2018	Incredibles 2	Edna Mode
2019	The Angry Birds Movie 2	Chuck
2019	How to Train Your Dragon: The Hidden World	Ivar the Whitless
