= Guardians of the Formula =

- Directed by: Dragan Bjelogrlić
- Written by: Vuk Ršumović; Dragan Bjelogrlić; Ognjen Sviličić
- Based on: The Case of Vinča by Goran Milašinović
- Produced by: Miroslav Mogorović; Goran Bjelogrlić; Nataša Višić; Dragan Bjelogrlić; Dragan Šolak
- Starring: Radivoje Bukvić; Alexis Manenti; Ognjen Mićović; Jovan Jovanović; Alisa Radaković
- Cinematography: Ivan Kostić
- Edited by: Milena Predić
- Music by: Aleksandar Ranđelović
- Production companies: Kobra film Ton film Srbija; Skoplje film studio Severna Makedonija; Perfo Slovenija; Bitter frames production Crna Gora
- Distributed by: Art Vista
- Release date: 4 August 2023
- Running time: 140 min
- Countries: Serbia; Slovenia; North Macedonia; Montenegro
- Languages: Serbian; French

Guardians of the Formula (Serbian: Чувари формуле / Čuvari formule) is a 2023 drama film directed by Dragan Bjelogrlić and written by Vuk Ršumović. It is based on the novel The Case of Vinča by Goran Milašinović, who was also a collaborator on the screenplay.

A co-production of Serbia, Slovenia, North Macedonia and Montenegro, the film follows the aftermath of the 1958 reactor incident at Vinča Nuclear Institute and the subsequent treatment of irradiated Yugoslav physicists at the Curie Institute in Paris, which involved the first bone marrow grafts between unrelated donors and hosts ever made in the world.

== Plot ==
In the midst of the Cold War crisis in October 1958, a group of scientists at the Vinča Nuclear Institute implemented a secret project led by professor Dragoslav Popović. Due to unforeseen circumstances, they are exposed to a lethal dose of radiation and are taken by the Yugoslav secret police to the Curie clinic in Paris for treatment.

The French medical team led by professor Georges Mathé concludes that their condition is critical and that their days are numbered. Although Mathé has dedicated his whole life to fighting against the possession of nuclear weapons and deeply despises the project which the Yugoslav scientists worked on, he proposes to carry out, for the first time in history, the delicate and uncertain intervention of replacing the bone marrow of irradiated patients.

== Cast ==
- Radivoje Bukvić as Dragoslav Popović
- Alexis Manenti as Georges Mathé
- Ognjen Mićović as Života Vranić
- Jovan Jovanović as Radojko Maksić
- Alisa Radaković as Rosanda "Rosa" Dangubić
- Lionel Abelanski as Henri Jammet
- Jérémie Laheurte as Léon Schwartzenberg
- Olivier Barthélémy as Derval
- Miki Manojlović as Pavle Savić
- Dragan Bjelogrlić as Aleksandar "Leka" Ranković
- Anne Serra as Odette Draghi
- Jean-Louis Coulloc'h as Raymond Castanier
- Cédric Appietto as Marcel Pabion
- Maja Čampar as Vera
- Jurij Drevešenk as Aleš Babnik
- Arnaud Humbert as Doctor 2
- Ana Blagojević as Mrs. Mathé
- Pierre-François Garde as Donor 1
- Stanislava Jeftić as Sister Tijamet
- Jérôme-Henri Cailleux as Donor 2
- Jean-Baptist Demarigny as Doctor 1
- Nikola Kmirnac as Paskal
- Loren Rui as Gardener
- Jovana Knežević as Sister Emili
- Sara Novak as Doctor Simone
- Nebojša Rako as Odette's husband
- Laurent Rouy as Gardener
- Predrag Lukić

== Production ==
Filming lasted for about a year at authentic locations in Serbia, Slovenia and France in the period between 2022 and 2023. The scenes depicting nuclear experiments were shot in the TRIGA experimental reactor operated by the Jožef Stefan Institute in Brinje near Ljubljana, Slovenia.

== Release ==
The world premiere of the film was held on August 4, 2023 at the Locarno Film Festival in Switzerland as part of the prestigious Piazza Grande program, where it won two awards: the Variety Award for best film in the selection Piazza Grande and the Green Leopard Award given to films with the most compelling message. On August 15, 2023, the film was screened out of competition as part of the main program of the 29th Sarajevo Film Festival, while the premiere in Serbia was held on October 24, 2023.

The film has been seen by 100,000 viewers in Serbian cinemas as of November 9, 2023.

== Critical reception ==
The film was met with positive reviews, who mostly praised Bukvić's and Manenti's performances and positively compared the film to Christopher Nolan's Oppenheimer (2023).

Stevica Rajčetić of Blic wrote that "this is a fictionalized truth created based on Goran Milašinović's novel The Case of Vinča, in which Milašinović brought the notorious accident closer to total thrilling mysticism situated behind the Iron Curtain, which was only shyly opening itself to the West. Bjelogrlić only upgraded that and created a masterpiece." Rajčetić praised the performances of Bukvić, Mićović, Jovanović and Radaković, and called Manenti's performance "masterful", while comparing the film to Oppenheimer and Chernobyl (2019). Milena Zajović of Večernji list wrote that, "if Vinča was the Serbian Chernobyl, then Guardians of the Formula is the Serbian Oppenheimer." She pointed out that the film's commercial appeal "is a powerful proof of the strength of the more recent Serbian production, whose films more often than the Croatian ones communicate with wider regional audiences, and in case of Guardians of the Formula, they simultaneously retain artistic and wider societal value." Branislav Predojević of Glas Srpske characterized Guardians as "definitely the best film in Bjelogrlić's directorial opus." Rating the film 5 out of 5, Predojević wrote that, "aware that he can't make a sumptuous spectacle about an atomic bomb, in order to compete with far more expensive western productions, [Bjelogrlić] made a tense, interesting and emotional drama about people who paid a heavy price with their health and lives due to atomic arms race during the Cold War. Put more simply, instead of a chain one, we got an emotional reaction understandable to every man, from Harrisburg and Chernobyl to Hiroshima and Nagasaki."

Marko Stojiljković of Pobjeda was less impressed. Comparing Guardians to Bjelogrlić's previous works Montevideo, God Bless You! (2010), Balkan Shadows (2017–present) and Toma (2021), he wrote that we could have expected "a little bit of political thriller atmosphere tied to a little bit of additional intelligence and 'sensational' revelation of the past. [...] We could have also expected that his expression will be more on the trail of (period) drama than going in some genre or a more demanding sociological or philosophical direction. We could have also expected that the film would look harmonious and professional, but not in any way stylishly imposing and innovative, and that Bjelogrlić's direction wiould be more or less textbook and 'invisible'." In his Danas review, Pavle Simjanović focused on the differences between real-life events and the plot, noting that he had read a segment of Slobodan Bubnjević's book Alchemy of a Bomb in preparation for the film analysis. He briefly concluded that Guardians "is intended for the unpretentious viewer who goes to the cinema a couple of times a year and who we hope will save this society in the upcoming elections."

Writing for Variety, Jessica Kiang drew comparisons between Guardians and Oppenheimer, but pointed out that "it differs in its careful inclusion of the heroism of ordinary people, and in showing how, while genius is valuable, it's only prolonged exposure to more everyday human decency that can irradiate the more bull-headed scientific ego with the compassion needed for actual wisdom." In her positive review, Kiang concluded that "Mathé and Popović changed history for sure. But a mechanic and a housewife changed them, ensuring for them a more benign legacy that finally gets due recognition here, in a film that proves, in elegant defiance of Chekov's Gun, that sometimes the most dramatic story is of the bomb that doesn't go off." She also praised Bukvić's and Manenti's performances. Screen International's Neil Young agreed with Kiang in his praise of Manenti and Bukvić, calling the film "conventional but mostly engaging". Young compared Guardians and Oppenheimer as well, but pointed out that the film about Mathé's accomplishment was "long overdue" and dubbed it "fundamentally a tribute to maverick Gallic genius".
