= Georges Mathé =

French oncologist and immunologist (1922–2010)

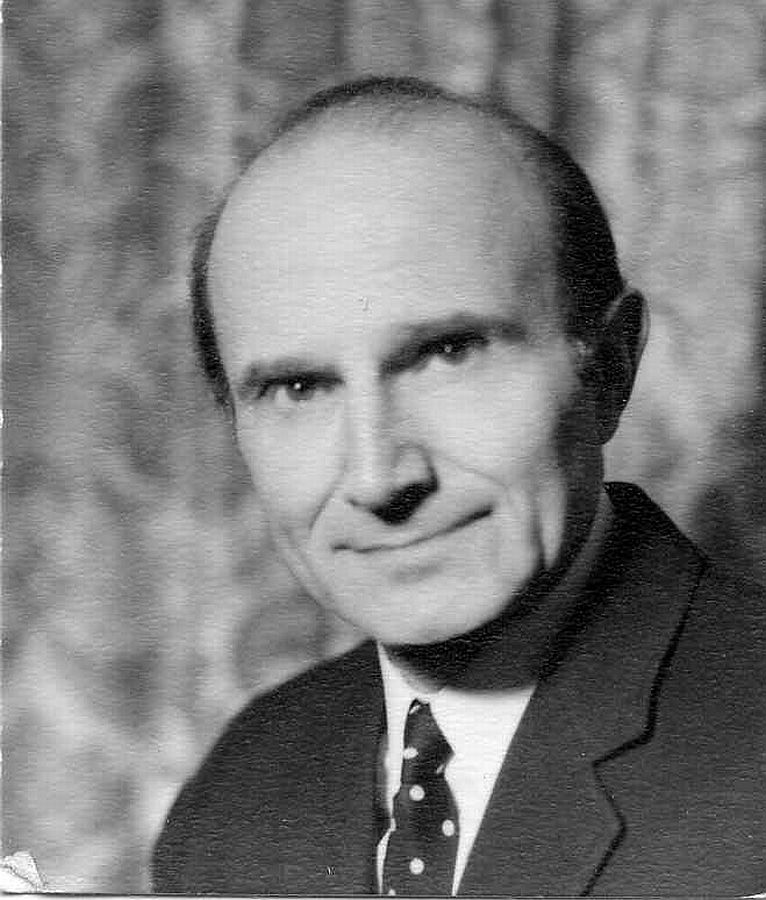
- Born: 9 July 1922
- Died: 15 October 2010 (aged 88)
- Known for: Oncology
- Awards: Cameron Prize for Therapeutics of the University of Edinburgh (1970)

Georges Mathé (9 July 1922 – 15 October 2010) was a French oncologist and immunologist. In November 1958, he performed the first successful allogeneic bone marrow transplant ever performed on unrelated human beings.

== Biography ==
Georges Mathé was born in 1922 in the village of Sermages, France, from a rural family. Selected by his village school master, he was sent to study in a boarding school in Moulins, Allier.

=== Education and early career ===
During World War II, he participated in the French Resistance, and studied to become a medical doctor in Paris. He graduated in 1950–51 with honors.

=== Oncology and bone marrow transplants ===
He engaged in medical research in the early fifties, and took an internship in immunology and oncology in the Memorial Sloan–Kettering Cancer Center, New York.

He specialised in hematology when working with Pr. Paul Chevallier and Pr. Jean Bernard, and devoting himself to child leukemia.

In November 1958, Mathé performed the first bone marrow graft between unrelated donors and hosts ever made in the world, in order to save four Yugoslav nuclear researchers who had been accidentally irradiated. That event made him aware of the possibility and necessity of developing active and adoptive immunotherapy and applying it to the treatment of cancers.

He also participated with René Kuss and Marcel Legrain in 1960 and 61 to the first successful kidney grafts between non related donors and hosts.

By 1963 he "shook the medical world" when he announced he had cured a patient of leukemia by means of a bone marrow transplant. He later showed that stem cells could not only heal radiation damage, but also fight cancer. He also demonstrated the positive role of BCG combined with irradiated tumoral cells.

Georges Mathé took over the Hematology Department of the Institut Gustave Roussy in Villejuif in 1961 and created the Institut de Cancérologie et d’Immuno-génétique in 1964 where he created the first sterile hospital rooms. He also taught experimental oncology at the University of Paris (1966 to 1990), created and managed (from 1980 to 1988) the Service des Maladies Sanguines et Tumorales in the Hôpital Paul-Brousse where he blended research and therapy with groundbreaking methods and results in chemotherapy and immunotherapy to develop polytherapies adapted to individual cases. .

He played a crucial role in the development of several important molecules such as acriflavine, bestatine, ellipticine, oxaliplatine, triptoreline and vinorelbine and actively participated in the development of polychemotherapy and chrono-chemotherapy.

Georges Mathé was one of the cofounders of the "Groupe Européen de Chimiothérapie Anticancéreuse" (G.E.C.A.) which was formally and legally established in 1962 by a group of European visionaries including Henri Tagnon, Silvio Garattini, Dirk van Bekkum, among others. Pr. Georges Mathé was the first President of GECA, from its creation in 1962 until 1965 and GECA became EORTC in 1968. In 1970, he was awarded the Cameron Prize for Therapeutics of the University of Edinburgh.

He also played a crucial role in the creation of the ARC in 1962, the INSERM in 1964, the CIRC in 1965, and the SMIC in 1975 which became the European Society for Medical Oncology (ESMO) in 1980.

=== Later career ===
In 1981, Mathé became a founding member of the World Cultural Council.

From 1990 to 2008, Mathé worked as a consultant at the Paris Swiss Hospital, at the Rome European Hospital, at the Sofia Oncological Hospital, at the Belgrade Civil Hospital and at the Hôpital Paul-Brousse.

In the early 1990s, conscious of the immunological nature of HIV/AIDS, Mathé applied immunotherapy to a dozen patients. He also successfully treated them with a cocktail of 5 alternating molecules, at a time when HIV/AIDS was considered ineluctably lethal and before the introduction of tritherapy.

All his life, he cooperated with researchers all around the world, particularly the US, Japan and, shortly before his death, China. He also chaired l’Entraide Médicale Internationale, which is devoted to improving African medicine.

He published more than a thousand articles and books, and received many international awards (Cameron Price, Gold Medal of the Ciba Foundation, Johan-Georg-Zimmermann Award, Health Memorial awards, Prix Bred du Cancer, International Award of chemotherapy, Gotlieb Memorial Award, Prix Leopold Griffuel du Cancer, Prix Medawar and Grande Médaille of the French Académie Nationale de Médecine).

Dr. Brian Bolwell, chief of hematology at the Cleveland Clinic noted that Dr. Mathé had proved an important principle: "You can cure an incurable leukemia patient.", and had developed both a technique and an important term, "adoptive immunotherapy," to describe how a person's own immune system can be used to combat cancer and other diseases.

Dr. Joseph H. Antin, chief of stem cell transplantation at the Dana–Farber Cancer Institute in Boston, summed up Mathé's work: "It was quite a leap of scientific genius. He’s one of the original innovators. Much of what we have accomplished can be linked back in a fairly direct way to the work that he did in the 1950s and ’60s."

== Death ==
Mathé died on October 15, 2010, at the Villejuif Hôpital Paul-Brousse, in France.

== The Georges Mathé Award ==
The Georges Mathé Award was launched in March 2010 by the Institut du Cancer et d'Immunogénétique (ICIG), to promote the therapeutic innovations and translational research initiated by Professor Georges Mathé. This annual distinction rewards a young researcher who has demonstrated audacity and originality in his / her work on the development of experimental and therapeutic research in the fields of cancer and immunology.

== In popular culture ==
Bone marrow grafts performed on irradiated Yugoslav researchers by Mathé's team in 1958 are depicted in the 2023 Serbian film Guardians of the Formula, where Mathé is portrayed by Alexis Manenti.

== Sources ==
- EBMT News, Nov 2010, A tribute to the late Georges Mathé by Norbert Gorin
- Mathé, Therapeutic strategy in acute leukemias, 1969, Queen Ann Press
- Mathé, Amiel and Schwarzenberg, Bone marrow transplantation and leucocyte transfusion, Springfield, 1971, Thomas
- Mathé, Larysse and Kenis, Cancer chemotherapy, Springer Verlag, Heidelberg, 1976
- Mathé, Lymphocytes, Macrophages and Cancers, Springer Verlag Heidelberg, 1976
- Mathé and Rappaport, Neoplastic diseases of hematopoietic and lymphoid tissues, Geneva, 1976, WHO
- Mathé, Cancer Immunotherapy, New York, 1976, Springer
- Mathé Cancer chemo-and immuno pharmacology, Springer Verlag, Heidelberg 1980
