= Goran Bjelogrlić =

Serbian film producer

- Горан Бјелогрлић
- Born: Baranda, SR Serbia, SFR Yugoslavia
- Occupation: Film producer

Goran Bjelogrlić (Serbian Cyrillic: Горан Бјелогрлић) is a Serbian film producer.

Goran is the older brother of Serbian movie star Dragan Bjelogrlić. Together they own and operate a production house Cobra Films. The latest project with his production was Shadows over Balkan.

== Filmography ==
- Shadows over Balkan (2017–2019) (producer)
- See You in Montevideo (2014) (producer)
- Montevideo, God Bless You! (2010) (producer)
- Vratice se rode (2007–2008) (producer)
- Ivkova slava (2005) (producer)
- Mali svet (2003) (producer)
- Skoro sasvim obicna prica (2003) (executive producer)
- Rat uzivo (2000) (executive producer)
- Rane (1998)
- Lepa sela lepo gore (1996) (executive producer) (producer)
