= Munje! =

2001 film by Рadivoje Andrić

- Theatrical release poster
- Directed by: Radivoje Andrić
- Written by: Srđa Anđelić
- Produced by: Zoran Cvijanović
- Starring: Boris Milivojević; Sergej Trifunović; Nikola Đuričko; Maja Mandžuka; Milica Vujović; Zoran Cvijanović; Nebojša Glogovac
- Cinematography: Dušan Joksimović
- Edited by: Marko Glušac
- Music by: Eyesburn
- Distributed by: Pro Vision
- Release dates: March 21, 2001 (FR Yugoslavia); October 3, 2001 (Poland)
- Running time: 90 minutes
- Country: FR Yugoslavia
- Language: Serbian

Munje! (Serbian Cyrillic: Муње!; English: Dudes or Thunderbirds) is a 2001 film directed by Radivoje Andrić. The main cast include Boris Milivojević, Sergej Trifunović, Nikola Đuričko, Maja Mandžuka, Milica Vujović, Zoran Cvijanović and Nebojša Glogovac. Famous football player of Belgrade's Crvena Zvezda Dušan Savić also appears as a special guest, portraying himself.

A sequel, Munje Opet!, was released in 2023.

== Plot ==
The plot of this urban comedy takes place in the 1990s, during a single evening in Belgrade. Mare, Pop and Gojko are three friends who grew up together. Mare and Pop have always wanted to be musicians, while Gojko, whom the two bullied and gave the nickname "Sisa" (meaning "boob"), became a businessman, the owner of a club and a recording studio.

Pop and Mare ask Gojko to help them release their drum and bass album, but Gojko hasn't forgotten the teasing he endured during his childhood and intends to take his revenge on them. It's a long night in Belgrade, and along the way Pop and Mare become interested in a girl named Kata, who happens to be Gojko's girlfriend. They also encounter Kata's friend, Lola, who is an aspiring singer, but lacks a backing band and seeks help from Gojko. While driving to a party Pop, Mare and Kata spot a burglar dressed as Santa Claus robbing a pharmacy for prescription drugs and let him ride with them after being nearly spotted by the police. Meanwhile, Gojko reveals to Lola that he intends to take the money given to him by Pop and Mare to produce their demo tape and use it to finance Lola's career. She immediately calls Mare and tells him about Gojko's plan, and he, Pop and Kata try to come up with a way to get their tape and money back. Before Kata confronts Gojko at his club, he breaks up with her, causing her to storm out. Left without a plan, they keep driving around aimlessly until they're pulled over by a policeman, who threatens arrest over drug possession, but subsequently reveals that he is a sympathizer of the opposition and doesn't care much for his job, thus deciding to accompany them out of boredom. While sitting outside, they meet football player Dušan Savić, who motivates them to take a stand. With the cop's help, Mare and Kata enter Gojko's club and begin their showdown. At the same time, Lola and her makeshift band begin a concert at the same club. Mare and Kata escape with the tape and money and confess their love to each other, while Pop gets together with Lola. After they spend the rest of the night in the car, Kata and Lola leave early in the morning. Marko and Pop also leave and "Santa Claus" and the cop take their car.

== Cast ==
- Boris Milivojević as Mare
- Sergej Trifunović as Pop
- Nikola Đuričko as Gojko
- Maja Mandžuka as Kata
- Milica Vujović as Lola
- Zoran Cvijanović as "Santa Claus"
- Nebojša Glogovac as cop
- Dušan Milašinović as Milanče
- Dušan Savić as himself
- Danijela Vranješ as neighbour/ violinist
- Nada Anđelić as Mare's mother
- Vesna Trivalić as Pop's mother (voice)/ cop's mother (voice)
- Lee Davis as American agent

== Soundtrack ==
The soundtrack include the songs composed for the movie, but also the songs of the other authors.

1. "Munje!" by Mao
2. "Rizlu imas licnu kartu nemas" by Meso
3. "Fool Control" by Eyesburn
4. "Superstar" by Darko Džambasov & Frtalj bukvara
5. "Beg sa žura" by Darko Obradović and Branislav Kovačević
6. "Gojko je moj dečko" by Darko Obradović and Branislav Kovačević
7. "Congrats" by Dominator
8. "Muzika za ljubljenje" by Darko Obradović and Branislav Kovačević
9. "Izlazim" by Kanda, Kodža i Nebojša
10. "Nigde" by Urgh!
11. "Hoću da džonjam" by Kolibriks
12. "A ko matori" by Sova
13. "Devojka iz drugog sveta" by Neočekivana Sila Koja Se Iznenada Pojavljuje i Rešava Stvar
14. "Noon Chaka Superfly" by Noon Chaka Superfly
15. "Piano Roll" by Noon Chaka Superfly
16. "Zapremina tela" by Darkwood Dub
17. "Novo svetsko čudo" by MC Flex (song of Beogradski sindikat)
18. "Right Direction" by Kanda, Kodža i Nebojša
19. "4 Hero Live in Belgrade" by 4 Hero
20. "Prvi pogled tvoj" by E-Play
21. "Manitua mi II" by Kanda, Kodža i Nebojša
22. "Apokalipso" by Darko Rundek
23. "Chica" by Sport i Reinkarnacija
24. "Disaster" by Neočekivana Sila Koja Se Iznenada Pojavljuje i Rešava Stvar
25. "Zašto ja" by Dr Iggy
26. "Battle Hymn of the Republic" by Fife & Drum Band
27. "Druga" by E-Play
28. "Crossover" by 4 Tune

== Release and reception ==
Munje! achieved great success in Serbia, where it was seen by more than 500,000 people, as well as in other former Yugoslav republics.
