= Requiem for Mrs. J. =

2017 film

- Film poster
- Directed by: Bojan Vuletić
- Written by: Bojan Vuletić
- Produced by: Alexander Rodnyansky
- Starring: Mirjana Karanović
- Release dates: 11 February 2017 (Berlin); 16 March 2017 (Serbia)
- Running time: 93 minutes
- Country: Serbia
- Language: Serbian

Requiem for Mrs. J. (Serbian: Реквијем за госпођу Ј.) is a 2017 Serbian drama and comedy film directed by Bojan Vuletić. It was screened in the Panorama section at the 67th Berlin International Film Festival. It was selected as the Serbian entry for the Best Foreign Language Film at the 90th Academy Awards, but it was not nominated.

== Plot ==
A widow plans to kill herself on the anniversary of her husband's death, but first seeks to tie up some absurd loose ends.

== Cast ==
- Mirjana Karanović as Gospodja J
- Jovana Gavrilović as Ana
- Danica Nedeljković as Koviljka
- Vučić Perović as Milance
- Mira Banjac as Desanka

== See also ==
- List of submissions to the 90th Academy Awards for Best Foreign Language Film
- List of Serbian submissions for the Academy Award for Best Foreign Language Film
