= Nikola Pejaković =

Bosnian actor and musician (born 1966)

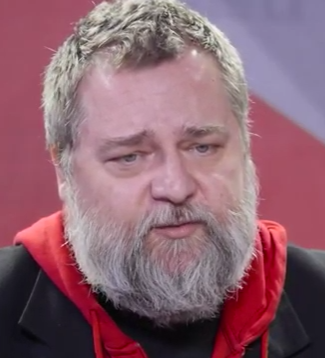
- Pejaković in 2019
- Born: 16 September 1966 (age 59); Banja Luka, SR Bosnia and Herzegovina, SFR Yugoslavia
- Education: University of Arts in Belgrade
- Occupations: Actor, television director, screenwriter, musician, singer, songwriter
- Musical career
- Also known as: Kolja
- Origin: Belgrade, Serbia
- Genres: Blues rock, acoustic rock, folk rock, funk, soul, comedy rock, rock
- Instruments: vocals, guitar, piano, harmonica
- Years active: since the mid-1980s
- Label: System Records

Nikola Pejaković (Serbian Cyrillic: Никола Пејаковић; born 16 September 1966) is a Serbian actor, screenwriter and musician. Beside his acting career, Pejaković is also a musician, playing the guitar, piano and harmonica. Since he was born without a little finger on his right hand, he is a four fingered guitarist, registered at the American Coalition for Disabled Musicians. He composed the ultimate kafana hit "Haljinica boje lila" ("Lilac-colored dress").

Pejaković wrote scenarios and appeared as actor in the movies Lepa sela lepo gore (Pretty village, pretty flame) and Rat uživo (War live). He directed the Složna braća television series and acted in the movies Mi nismo anđeli (We are not angels), directed by Srđan Dragojević, and Rock and roll uzvraća udarac (We Are Not Angels 3: Rock and roll strikes back), directed by Petar Pašić. He is a theatre director and his plays usually feature the mise-en-scene, costumes and soundtrack entirely created by him.

== Education ==
After finishing Secondary Art School, he entered the Art Faculty of Dramatic Arts in Belgrade, where he received a diploma in theater directing.

== Career as musician ==
=== Kolja i Smak Bijelog Dugmeta ===
The songs Pejaković had composed during the mid-1980s were released on his debut album Mama, nemoj plakati (Mum, do not cry), released by System Records in 2001. Influenced by diverse range genres and crossing them with witty and a bit vulgar lyrics, Pejaković described his musical style as "porn soul". The songs were recorded with a studio backing band, which he named Smak Bijelog Dugmeta (a witty remark on the two popular 1970s Yugoslav bands, Smak and Bijelo Dugme), composed of Saša Lokner (keyboards), Vojislav Aralica (album producer, guitar, bass, keyboards) and Dejan Momčilović (drums). For the album cover, Pejaković chose Dragan Papić's work called "Žalim slučaj" ("So sorry"). The album was recorded between 25 October 1998 and 13 January 1999 at the Goran Kostić Go-Go studio in Belgrade. He composed Oleg Novković's Normalni ljudi (Normal people) movie soundtrack in 2001, and in 2005 he wrote the Wedding short movie soundtrack, both of which never officially released on a soundtrack album.

From December 2004 until August of the following year, Pejaković once again entered the Go-Go studio in order to record the material for his second solo album, but it was not until 2009 that the album Kolja was released, once again through System Records. Pejaković recorded the album with the backing vocalists Jasmina Nunić Pera and Tamara Aralica, producer Vojislav Aralica who recorded keyboards, slide, acoustic, electric and bass guitar, Ivan Aleksijević on organ and keyboards, Neša Petrović on alt saxophone and Dejan Sparavalo on violin. In order to promote the album release, Pejaković also recorded a cover version of the Šarlo Akrobata song "Samo ponekad" ("Just occasionally"), released for free digital download at the System Records official site.

=== "Haljinica boje lila" ===
Pejaković wrote the folk music hit "Haljinica boje lila" ("A lily colored dress"), with his, at the time, girlfriend and turbo folk singer Lola, with whom he recorded the song. The song was recorded with at the time anonymous producer Željko Joksimović, being eventually released on Lola's album Crne oči (Dark eyes) in 2001. A live version of the song was released on the second studio album, Kolja, released in 2009.

The Croatian pop singer Severina recorded a cover version of the song in 2008 on her album Zdravo Marijo (Hail Mary), featuring the arrangements made by Goran Bregović.

== Personal life ==
Pejaković is an active supporter of Aleksandar Vučić and his Serbian Progressive Party.

== Discography ==
=== Studio albums ===
- Mama, nemoj plakati (2001)
- Kolja (2009)
- Grobovlasnici (2013)
- 4 Prsta (2018)

=== Singles ===
- "Samo ponekad" (2009)
- "Svaku noć je isti mrak" (2018)

== Sources ==
- EX YU ROCK enciklopedija 1960–2006, Janjatović Petar; ISBN 978-86-905317-1-4
