= The Black Bomber =

Црни бомбардер Crni bombarder The Black Bomber
- Directed by: Darko Bajić
- Written by: Darko Bajić; Aleksandar Barišić
- Starring: Dragan Bjelogrlić; Anica Dobra; Srđan Todorović
- Release date: 15 June 1992 (Yugoslavia)
- Running time: 116 min
- Country: Yugoslavia
- Language: Serbian

The Black Bomber (Serbian: Црни бомбардер, romanized: Crni Bombarder) is a 1992 Yugoslavian drama film by Serbian director Darko Bajić. It takes place in Belgrade in a fictional authoritarian near-future (1999), modeled closely on the conditions in Serbia at the beginning of the Yugoslav Wars. The film follows an anti-establishment radio host, Crni (Dragan Bjelogrlić) and the rock singer Luna (Anica Dobra), his friend and lover. The radio station Crni works for, Boom 92 (modeled after B92) is shut down as subversive, after which he sets up his own roving broadcast studio in a pickup truck, called "Crni bombarder" (The Black Bomber).

Srđan Gile Gojković from Električni Orgazam produced the soundtrack featuring other members of the band, as well as Anica Dobra on vocals and Vlada Divljan from Idoli.

== Cast ==
- Dragan Bjelogrlić - Crni
- Anica Dobra - Luna
- Srđan Todorović - Fleka
- Petar Božović - Bešević
- Dragan Maksimović - Psiho
- Boris Milivojević - Prki
- Žarko Laušević - Šmajser
- Bogdan Diklić - Glavonja
- Danilo Stojković - President Bogdan Marković
- Bogdan Tirnanić - Opozicija
- Katarina Žutić - DDT
- Željko Mitrović - Marsovac
- Predrag Laković - Gazda
- Goran Radaković - Vaske
