= War Live (film) =

2000 Yugoslavian film

- Serbian: Рат уживо
- Directed by: Darko Bajić
- Screenplay by: Nikola Pejaković; Dragan Bjelogrlić
- Produced by: Goran Bjelogrlić
- Starring: Gordan Kičić; Srđan Todorović; Aleksandar Berček; Bata Živojinović; Vesna Trivalić
- Music by: Toma Babovic
- Release date: 2000
- Running time: 1h 41m
- Country: Yugoslavia
- Language: Serbian

War Live (Serbian: Рат уживо, translit. Rat uživo) is a 2000 Yugoslavian film directed by Darko Bajić. It was Yugoslavia's submission to the 74th Academy Awards for the Academy Award for Best Foreign Language Film, but was not accepted as a nominee.

== See also ==
- Cinema of Yugoslavia
- List of submissions to the 74th Academy Awards for Best Foreign Language Film
- List of Serbian submissions for the Academy Award for Best Foreign Language Film
