= Vanja Bulić =

Serbian journalist and author

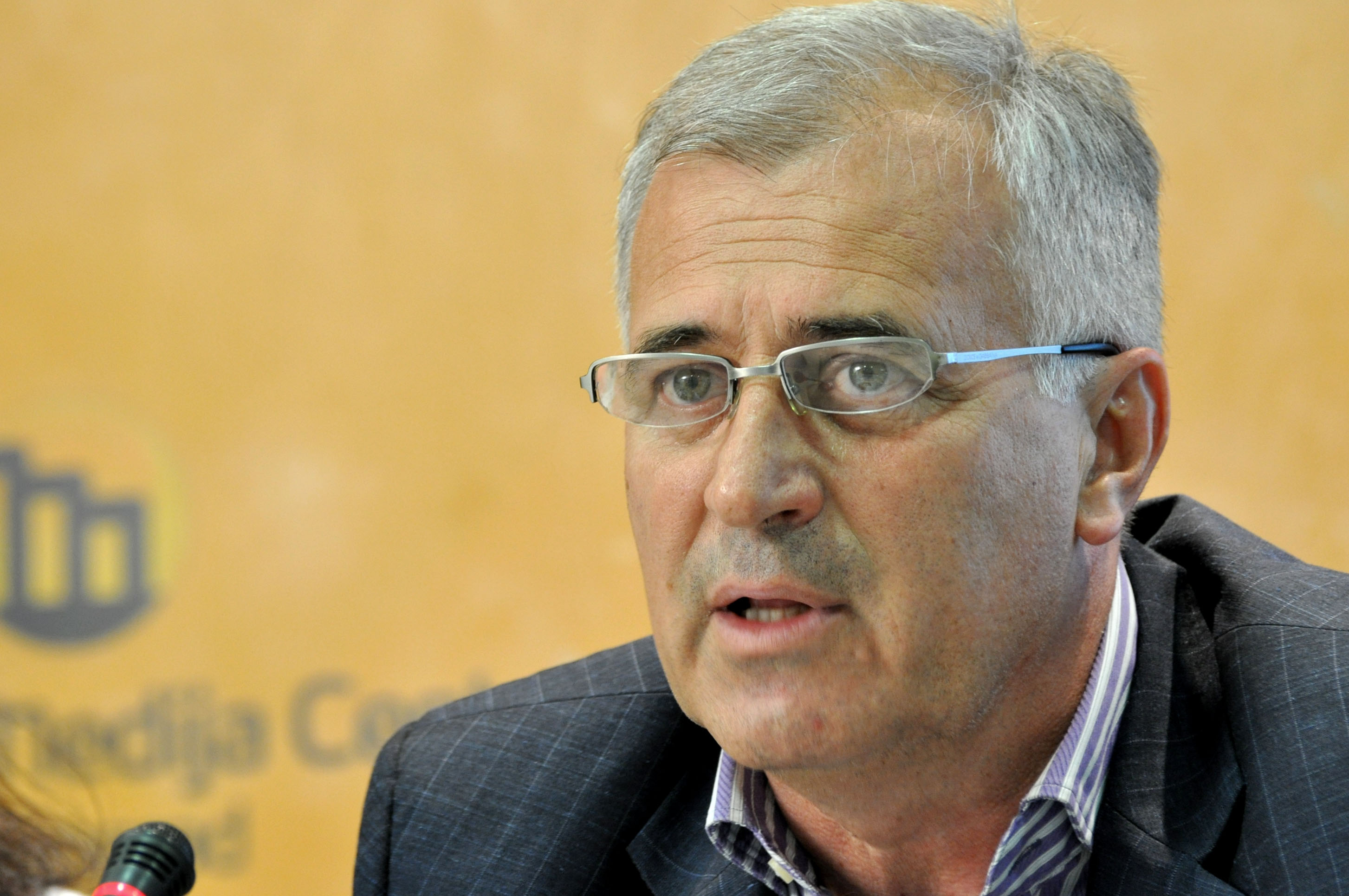
- Bulić in 2008
- Born: 17 July 1947 (age 78); Kumanovo, PR Macedonia, FPR Yugoslavia
- Occupations: Journalist, television presenter
- Known for: Crni biseri

Vanja Bulić (Serbian Cyrillic: Вања Булић; born 17 July 1947) is a Serbian journalist and author.

He has lived in Belgrade since 1952. He was the screenwriter of the acclaimed movie Pretty Village Pretty Flame. He rose to fame with his TV show, Crni biseri, in the 90s, in which he interviewed people from all walks of life. He was editor-in-chief of the Duga magazine, that played an important role in 90s Serbia. He wrote in almost every high-profile Serbian journal, had shot over 2000 TV shows and wrote several bestselling books and movie scenarios.

== Books ==
- Kako sam gajio blizance (1995)
- Tunel - lepa sela lepo gore (1996)
- Ratna sreća (1999)
- Vrele usne (2001)
- Parada strasti (2003)
- Drugo stanje (2006)
- Sto bisera (2009)
- Oko otoka (2009)
- Šole (2010)
- Zadah belog (2010)
- Simeonov pečat (2012)
- Jovanovo zaveštanje (2013)
- Dosije Bogorodica (2014)
- Muškarac u izvesnim godinama (2014)
- Teslina pošiljka (2015)
- Viza za nebo (2016)
- Zašto Bog nema auto (2016)
- Dušanova kletva (2018)
- Teodorin prsten (2019)
- Savin osvetnik (2020)
