= Srđan Dragojević =

Serbian film director and screenwriter (born 1963)

- Срђан Драгојевић
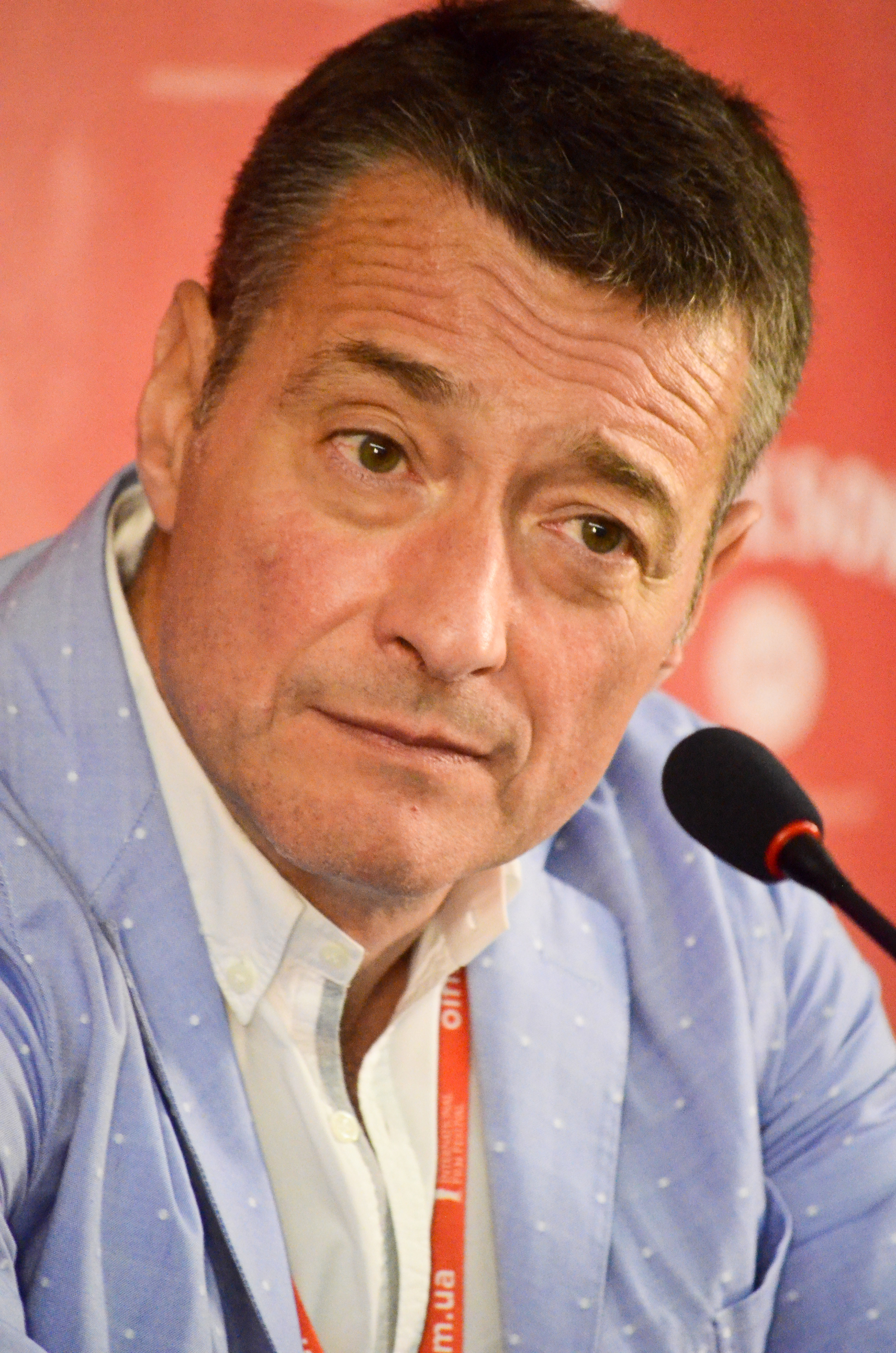
- Dragojević in 2015

Member of the National Assembly of Serbia
- In office August 2013 – May 2016

Personal details
- Born: 1 January 1963 (age 63) Belgrade, PR Serbia, FPR Yugoslavia
- Party: Socialist Party of Serbia (SPS) (2010–2017)
- Education: University of Belgrade (BA); University of Arts in Belgrade (BA)
- Profession: Clinical psychologist; film and television director
- Occupations: Film director; screenwriter; politician; legislator; poet; journalist; bassist
- Years active: 1986–present
- Notable work: Mi nismo anđeli, Lepa sela lepo gore, Rane, Parada
- Spouse: Tatjana Strugar (m. 1988; div. 2005)
- Children: 5

Srđan Dragojević (Serbian Cyrillic: Срђан Драгојевић, pronounced [sř̩d͡ʑan drâɡojeʋitɕ], born 1 January 1963) is a Serbian film director and screenwriter, who emerged in the 1990s as a significant figure in Serbian cinema.

From 2010 until 2017, he was affiliated with the Socialist Party of Serbia (SPS). In late August 2013 he became an SPS MP in the Serbian National Assembly.

== Early life and career ==
Born to a journalist father Anđelko Dragojević (1934-2017) hailing from Srbica and a French translator mother Ljiljana, Dragojević once described himself as a "child of middle-level communist nomenklatura in Serbia". His father worked as a staff writer at Belgrade-based daily newspapers Borba and Večernje novosti, including a managerial stint at OOUR Novosti media company. In his early youth, Dragojević played bass guitar in the punk/new wave band TV Moroni. He also dabbled in journalism, writing for Polet newspaper and Start magazine.

He obtained a degree in clinical psychology from the University of Belgrade's Faculty of Philosophy.

In parallel, Dragojević was active in poetry, publishing a book of poems called Knjiga akcione poezije (The Book of Action Poetry) in 1986 and winning the prestigious Branko's Award for it. By his own admission, much of his poetry was inspired by the 1920s Soviet art and poets like Vladimir Mayakovsky:

For me, Soviet art is the artistic pinnacle of the 20th century. The stories about thousands of people listening to poetry live both fascinated and inspired me. And it wasn't just any poetry, it was the most refined art, yet it managed to find its way to the ordinary populace - workers and peasants. And to communicate important ideas. And to speak to people that prior to that never had any experience with poetry. You know, after the success of my [Knjiga akcione poezije] book, the Serbian Writers' Association sent me out to different poetry readings in various Cultural Centers. But, all you'd see there were twenty grandmas who probably came inside just to warm up a bit. No young person in sight, completely depressing! I knew I had to change my medium, right then and there.

In 1987, Dragojević passed the entrance exam for the film and TV direction program at the University of Arts' Faculty of Dramatic Arts (FDU) where he studied under the tutelage of Bajo Šaranović. He subsequently published one more book of poetry, Čika kovač potkiva bebu, in 1988 before devoting fully to film. He briefly came back to poetry in 1995 as an already established film director to release Katkad valja pročitati poneku knjigu da ne ispadnete glupi u društvu.

== Cinematic career ==
=== Debut and early period ===
Dragojević made his directorial debut at the age of twenty-nine with 1992's Mi nismo anđeli whose screenplay he had previously written as well. What was essentially his FDU graduate thesis project, an irreverent youth comedy set in Belgrade about a geeky teenage girl who gets impregnated by a local lothario, turned out to be a huge cinema box-office hit in FR Yugoslavia and eventually in the rest of the former Yugoslav countries. During the film's promotional cycle in 1992 in FR Yugoslavia, young and telegenic Dragojević talked about not approaching Mi nismo anđeli artistically, i.e., consciously attempting to make a commercial movie via gambling on the teen comedy sub-genre that had no prior root in Yugoslavia. The upstart director further described his general approach to filmmaking as "trying to deliver professional cinematic offerings that resemble those from the West". Revealing a future career goal of continuing to direct but also to branch out into film production, he proudly stated his opposition to the "hideous" European auteur cinema while talking of his openness to commodification of film by wanting to work as a producer that oversees all aspects of a film in production, including hiring of a director as a contractor—a practice usually looked down upon in Europe. In his numerous media appearances, Dragojević talked up his movie by expressing a personal opinion that with Mi nismo anđeli he "delivered a solid product that could hardly have been better than it is considering the circumstances it was made in". In order to market the movie easier and more effectively in Yugoslavia, Dragojević even came up with a term "[Yugoslav] pink wave" as an anti-reference to the critically acclaimed and film-festival-celebrated social problem films of the Yugoslav Black Wave movement.

With his cinematic profile raised, in 1993, Dragojević was set to begin shooting a campy Almodóvaresque project tentatively titled Devedesete (The Nineties) about loyalty, jealousy, infidelity, and intimacy, with the original plan to shoot three separate endings and distribute three versions of the film. However, the financial implosion of the state-owned production studio Avala Film amid galloping inflation in FR Yugoslavia put an end to that project.

He was next hired along with Aleksandar Barišić to co-write a star vehicle for turbo-folk star Dragana Mirković that eventually became 1994's widely panned, romantic musical comedy Slatko od snova.

The year 1994 also saw Dragojević write and direct a made-for-TV musical comedy Dva sata kvalitetnog TV programa ("Two Hours of Quality TV Programming") that aired on RTS television's third channel (3K) as part of their New Year's Eve 1995 programming. During next year, 1995, he directed a couple of episodes of the RTS series Otvorena vrata ("Open Doors").

=== Critical acclaim ===
Four years after his debut, Dragojević finally returned to directing feature films - this time completely breaking out of the youth genre to tackle the gruesome issues related to the ongoing Yugoslav Wars with a controversial drama containing elements of dark comedy, Lepa sela lepo gore, set in war-torn Bosnia. In addition to critical praise, the movie made a measurable commercial impact with more than 700,000 tickets sold domestically during its theatrical run. It also raised plenty of controversy across Europe over its ideological aspects: while many saw it as a powerful denouncement of war, others viewed it as "fascist cinema". The movie was even refused entry at the 1996 Venice Film Festival in addition to splitting the jury at the 1996 Thessaloniki International Film Festival that ultimately denied it the main prize despite being an overwhelming hit with the festival's audience. In North America, the film received more or less universal critical praise as Dragojević started getting courted by Hollywood almost immediately following the film's notable run on the festival circuit across the continent. He signed with William Morris Agency in late summer 1996 and got flown to Los Angeles where he had meetings with different studio heads. However, deeply dissatisfied with the scripts he was being offered, the director decided to come back home and do another film in Serbia. Therefore, the only tangible result of his brief flirtation with Hollywood on this occasion was the deal with Fox Lorber for the North American limited theatrical and home video distribution of Lepa sela lepo gore.

Back home on the political front, Dragojević supported the 1996-97 anti-government demonstrations by speaking at rallies and taking part in protest walks.

In 1998 Dragojević gave a bleak and critical portrayal of life in Slobodan Milošević's Serbia in Rane, which was another critical success for the young director. Loosely based on a true story, its plot follows the descent of two Belgrade youngsters from youthful exuberance into juvenile delinquency and hard criminality amid economic sanctions in FR Yugoslavia as their personal relationship transforms from close friendship to impulsively vicious rivalry. Released in May 1998 and, like most local productions, funded in large part by state institutions such as the state-run broadcaster RTS, the film elicited a stern response from the government elements that did not appreciate the director's brutal portrayal of Milošević's Serbia. Though they didn't ban the movie outright, they severely impacted its promotional cycle by refusing to run the film's ads in the state-run print and electronic media outlets. During the film's promotion on the festival circuit in North America, Dragojević expressed concern that he wouldn't be allowed to continue making films in Serbia under Milošević.

Those fears didn't turn out to be unfounded as his attempts to raise funds for the film adaptation of Dušan Kovačević's 1984 theater play St. George Slays the Dragon quickly got shot down.

=== Hollywood years ===
By 1999 Dragojević had enough of Serbia as the realization set in that he wouldn't be allowed to make films the way he wants to. He thus called on his Hollywood connections in order to once again explore his options across the pond and soon opened negotiations with Miramax as he again started to get some interest from America including a January screening of Rane at the Sundance Film Festival.

In late March 1999, a week into NATO's bombing of Serbia, Dragojević boarded a bus to Budapest with his wife and their two kids and went to New York City where he had a scheduled screening of Rane organized by the Film Society of Lincoln Center at the Museum of Modern Art as part of its annual 28th New Director's/New Films series. The arrival to the country that's bombing his homeland put him in an odd and uncomfortable position and he acknowledged as much in interviews. He remained in the United States, travelling across the country with Rane that had several more festival screenings (including the San Francisco International Film Festival) while simultaneously negotiating terms with Miramax.

==== New York City ====
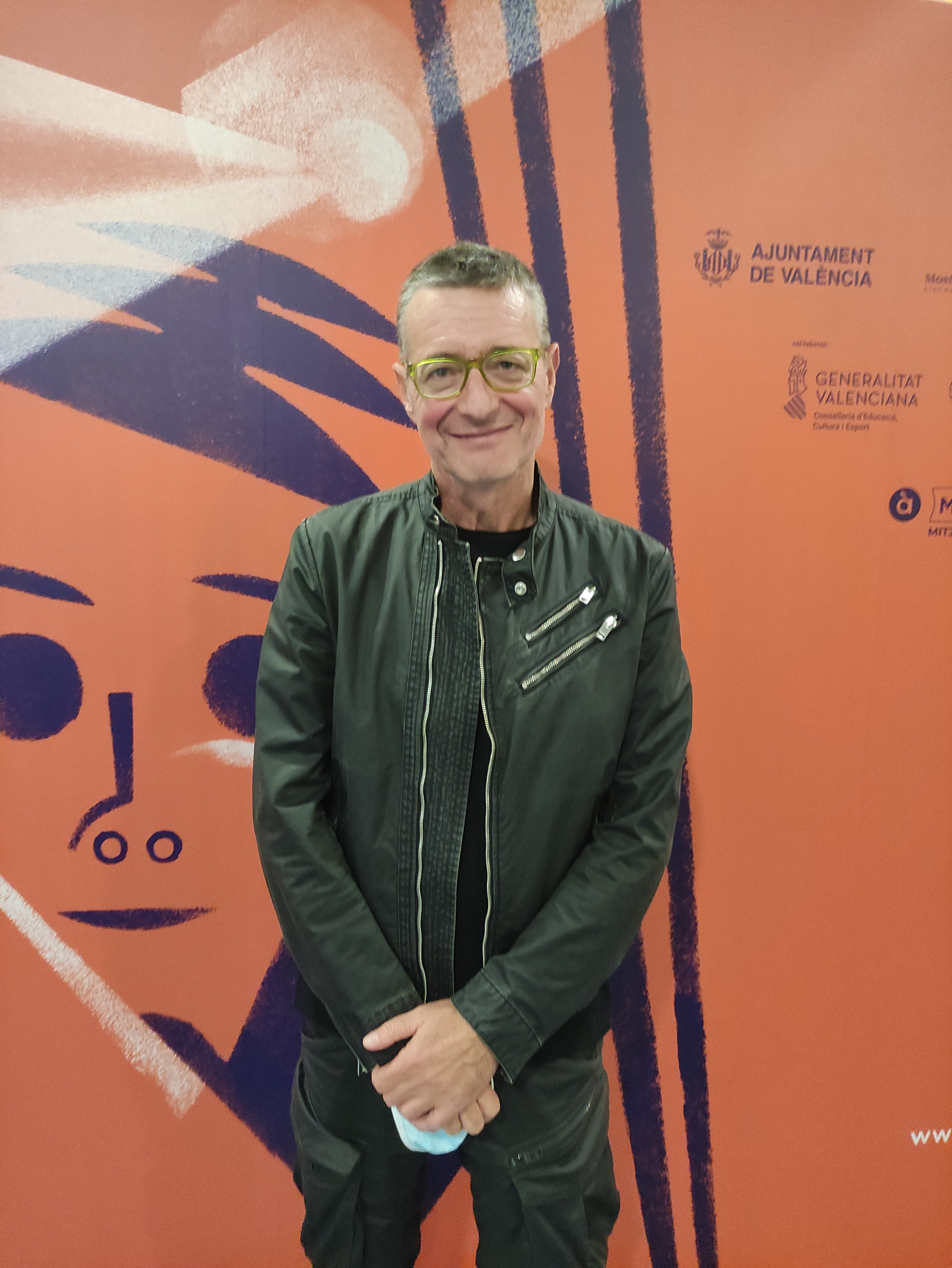
Dragojević, 2021, in the Mostra de València.

From July 1999, with his Miramax deal announced, Dragojević would end up spending the following two years living and working in the United States, initially in New York City. He was under the so-called first-look deal that obligated him to offer everything he's interested in developing (either his own work or someone else's work the rights for which could be bought) to Miramax first and then if Miramax refuses it, he was free to shop it around elsewhere. The deal also functioned in the other direction whereby Miramax would offer him scripts, books, stories or re-make ideas they thought fit his sensibility and he'd have the right of refusal.

However, Dragojević experienced major problems persuading the studios to sign-off on his suggestions, and did not like the ideas being offered to him.

Soon upon arriving, Dragojević met with Miramax boss Harvey Weinstein who offered him Milčo Mančevski's script Dust. Dragojević refused, however, reasoning that it's a very personal script that can more or less only be directed by Mančevski, and also due to discovering that, as he put it in a later interview, "offering me that script in the first place was the Weinstein brothers' little 'fuck you' to Mančevski whom they were on bad terms with at that moment". The studio then offered Dragojević the Heaven, Hell, Purgatory trilogy, while they particularly wanted him to direct Hell, however, he turned it down vehemently, labeling the script "the dumbest thing I've ever read" in another interview. The script would eventually be filmed by Danis Tanović. Dragojević, in turn, was interested in filming Patrick Marber's play Closer from the moment he first arrived in the United States, but the studio kept turning him down, eventually hiring veteran director Mike Nichols who got to make the film in 2004. The studio then offered Dragojević Reindeer Games, with Bob Weinstein reportedly presenting it as "the best script we've got", but the director didn't particularly like it and refused, figuring something better would come along. In later interviews, Dragojević expressed regret over not taking the offer to direct Reindeer Games due to "realizing two and half years later [after getting Miramax's other script offers] that it really was the best script they had".

==== Los Angeles ====
By spring 2000, Dragojević, along with his wife and kids, relocated to Los Angeles, settling in Laurel Canyon. He would continue going to pitch meetings for studio projects he was interested in, essentially director auditions for films that were in the development phase.

He was, by his own admission, particularly interested in directing either Frida or View from the Top, however, in the case of the former, the movie's producer and star Salma Hayek wanted a female director so the job went to Julie Taymor while in the case of the latter, the film's producers as well as its star Gwyneth Paltrow didn't like Dragojević's ironic take on the screenplay and Bruno Barreto got the job instead. He was also in the running for The Mexican, but the job went to Gore Verbinski.

The closest he got to making a Hollywood movie was the heist-comedy —The Payback All-Star Revue—that was agreed to be a co-production between Miramax and Mel Gibson's Icon Productions. The announcement was made in November 2000 with Dragojević upbeat about the project he envisioned as a "funny and commercial film containing a unique mix of genres, including Shakespearean subplots and unpredictable structures". The plot revolved around a band of lounge musicians playing in the Riviera casino in Las Vegas who decide to rob the place where they perform. Though they manage to pull off the heist successfully, they run into troubles during the getaway. Now trapped, they agree to give themselves up on the condition that they are granted an interview with a Rolling Stone reporter to tell their story. The planned plot featured a multitude of characters with many subplots. However, in the middle of pre-production the movie got canceled in 2001 due to an impending SAG strike threat and the Warner Bros.' announcement of putting Ocean's 11 remake with an all-star cast into pre-production, which Miramax thought would jeopardize Payback's box-office appeal. Over the following years, by now known for his frank and colourful interviews, Dragojević talked openly about the experience:

The whole thing is actually kind of hilarious. After turning down a bunch of scripts, and also having a lot of my own ideas turned down I really needed to clear my head. So I rented a car and spent the entire summer traveling all over the United States and Canada with my family. Before that, among the pile of scripts my agent had been sending me, I read this thing called The Payback All-Star Revue, and I told her that it isn't all that bad—mostly out of desire to not have her thinking I'm some sort of nutcase who rejects everything. After my return to LA a couple of months later, my agent set up a meeting at Icon without telling me specifically what it's about so I assumed it to be another general exchange of ideas. So, after half an hour of pleasantries, they bring up this Payback script and at that moment I didn't have the slightest clue what they're talking about. This is what a deep and lasting impression that script had left on me. So, attempting to save face, I start bullshitting them with the most general crap ever told about how the script is hip and how it has broad appeal yet it's also smart. I mean, utter meaningless nonsense. So now the meeting is over and I'm going home completely red-faced and embarrassed, but then my agent calls and tells me I got the job because the Icon people are ecstatic with my 'vision of the material'. So I quickly dug up that script just to read it over again and see what I've gotten myself into. I froze in horror. It was an absolute pile of shit. I then spent the following six months fighting tooth and nail to improve the script, which from the creative standpoint was like being a cook who's been handed a bowl of excrement and asked to make a half-decent meal out of it. And from the business end it was just as hard because I had six executives standing over my head, micromanaging everything. In total, I fought them for a year over the screenplay and casting because I simply couldn't take this notion that they've got the final say. We eventually reached what looked to be a compromise: they accepted my version of the script and I accepted their shitty casting choices such as Joshua Jackson for example. I figured I've directed first-time actors before, so I guess I should be able to work with their American imbeciles. I even flew in my director of photography Dušan Joksimović from Belgrade. However, during all this bickering, Ocean's Eleven was announced, which had a similar theme, and they suddenly canceled the [Payback All-Star Revue] project. Still, the movie we were about to make wouldn't have been shit. It wouldn't have been all that good either, but it definitely would have been better than Ocean's Eleven.

Summing up his Hollywood experience, Dragojević said:

People in Europe view Miramax as this artsy and independent studio where directors have all the artistic freedom they want, but that's most definitely not the case. You can only have that if you're already well-known or famous... or if you've got a big name star attached to your film who's got your back when you're dealing with the producers and the studio. When you're a young and unknown director from Europe, your degree of artistic autonomy is zero... I spent years fighting for certain projects I wanted to be part of, showing up to meetings all geeked up with ten pages of typed notes I prepared containing script improvements, visual notes, etc. while verbally offering them suggestions, solutions, criticism. And nothing, they always chose someone else. Until I finally had a moment of enlightenment and realization that all they really want from a director is enthusiasm. Not creativity, not knowledge, not intelligence, but only blind enthusiasm. They don't see the director as an author, not even as a craftsman—the craftspeople [to them] are those around [the director] like the assistant director or the DOP. A film director to them is a (sub)contractor who ensures the mood on the set is good. And that in a nutshell is why I eventually had enough and decided to leave.

=== Return to Serbia ===
By late 2001, Dragojević returned to his homeland without having made a film in America. With producer Biljana Prvanović, he founded a production company Delirium Films in 2002.

In early 2003 he was announced as having been hired to develop a script for and eventually direct Beautiful Game, film based on Andrew Lloyd Webber's musical that had already been staged in London's West End. Along with a young American writer, Dragojević came up with an adapted screenplay from Ben Elton's story set in West Belfast during the 1970s about a group of Protestants and Catholics playing on the same football team as sectarian tensions surround them. However, in the end nothing came of it and years later Dragojević revealed in an interview that a row erupted with producers over his desire to remove two of the songs.

Around the same time, he also tried to get several projects off the ground such as the post-Holocaust novel After by Melvin Jules Bukiet with producer friend Julia Rosenberg as well as a proposed film based on Julian Barnes' 1992 novel The Porcupine, but was unable to raise funds for either of them. He also had an idea for a film called 1999 Cum in the Rye that was conceptualized as the final installment of his 1990s trilogy, but it also couldn't raise enough funding.

Suddenly, in summer 2004, he decided to make Mi nismo anđeli 2, the sequel to his greatest commercial hit after reportedly writing the screenplay from scratch in only three weeks. Shot in co-production with Pink International Company and released in early 2005, Mi nismo anđeli 2 broke box office records in Serbia with 700,000 admission tickets sold despite receiving bad reviews and even accusations of plagiarizing Stan Dragoti's 1989 comedy She's Out of Control. Dragojević himself on occasion referred to the film as an "open dialogue with the 1980s American B-comedy genre". Still, some observers saw his involvement in the project as an attempt at delivering a quick commercial box-office hit that would financially enable the projects he was really interested in making. Dragojević initially shied away from putting it in those terms, but several years later admitted as much explicitly in some interviews.

Around the same time Dragojević wrote one of the script drafts for Uroš Stojanović's film Čarlston za Ognjenku that he wrote as a "screwball comedy or postmodern Frank Capra", however, Stojanović ultimately went into a different direction with the film.

Right afterward, Dragojević started working on the third installment of the Mi nismo anđeli franchise. This resulted in Mi nismo anđeli 3: Rokenrol uzvraća udarac that he co-wrote with Dimitrije Vojnov, but left directing duties to Petar Pašić. The approach taken was along the lines of Hollywood cinema - the script was offered to seven directors each of whom had to make a pitch with Pašić chosen in the end. Still, the reviews were even worse than for the previous sequel and the movie was a failure at the box office. Summing up the Mi nismo anđeli sequels several years later in 2009, Dragojević said:

You know, I fully understand and accept the animosity that both the industry people as well as the fans of the original feel towards the sequels. Anđeli 2 was made solely out of my desperate desire to raise funds for the project I had fought for over three years—the film adaption of Julian Barnes' The Porcupine, a dark political thriller about communism and transition into capitalism. Anđeli 2 started doing really well in the theaters in 2005, but a bootleg copy soon appeared and although the film still made a nice profit, we didn't quite manage to raise the projected amount that was to serve as the initial funds for The Porcupine. I should also mention the veto slapped by the Bosnian representative at a Eurimages session, which pretty much killed any chance of The Porcupine being made. Furthermore, Anđeli 3 was part of the same package deal with Pink International Company that also included the 1999 project. However, after the film was shot, Pink Television changed their mind so that, instead of being shown as a TV movie on Pink, Anđeli 3 went into theatrical release in 2006. Its failure at the box office, pretty much melted all the money Anđeli 2 made. Now, several years after the fact, I can say there's even some poetic justice in that: my motivation for making those two films wasn't just making money, but also enabling the creation of other serious movies. And since I ultimately failed to achieve that goal, any financial effect from Anđeli sequels is meaningless as far as I'm concerned. Those two films were my career detour that turned out to be a cul-de-sac. And I've only got myself to blame for that. Was I a fool? Definitely. But, at least I put up a fight. In Serbia, most filmmakers prefer to do nothing and live off yesterday's glory. I, for one, like making movies.

Dragojević was brought by John Cusack into the project titled Brand Hauser: Stuff Happens, which the Serb was slated to direct. However, the production company Nu Image led by Avi Lerner wanted the script re-written, a job that also went to Dragojević who in turn brought in Dimitrije Vojnov thus continuing their writing collaboration. The script that the duo came up with has been described by Dragojević as "a modern-day Dr. Strangelove". Dragojević then spent three months in Bulgaria doing preparation work with his set designer and director of photography, even flying out to locations in Morocco and Kazakhstan where parts of the movie were to be shot. Then weeks before the movie was scheduled to begin shooting, Cusack chimed in from London where he had been shooting 1408, voicing his displeasure with Dragojević's and Vojnov's version of the script and demanding a return to the original version co-written by Cusack himself. That spelled the end of Dragojević's involvement on the project as he decided to leave Bulgaria the next day. The movie ended up being shot with the original script and the new title War, Inc.. The only detail from Dragojević's script re-write that made it into the movie was the billboard for the fictional Democracy Light cigarette brand, which he previously used in his movie Rane.

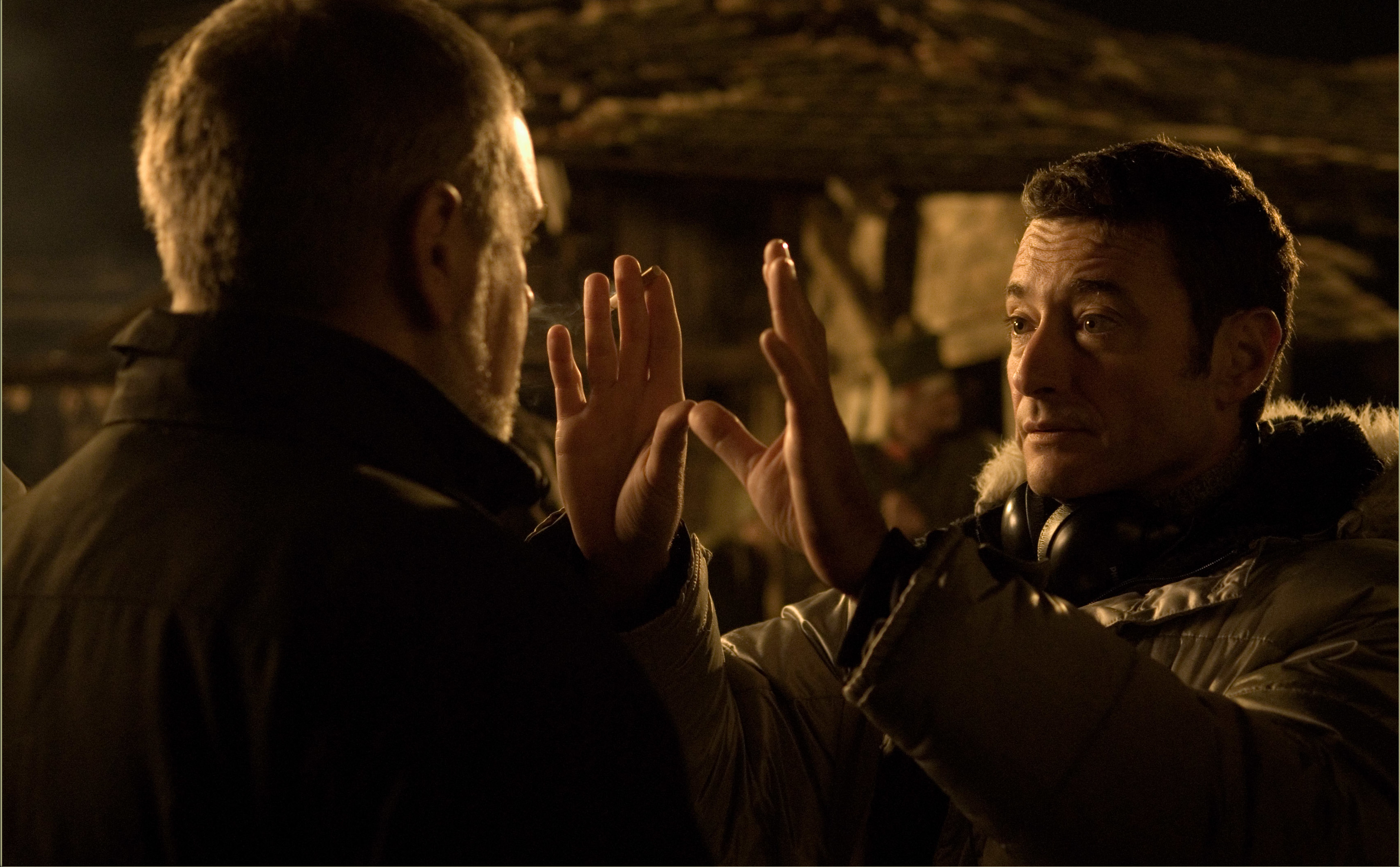
Dragojević on the set of St. George Shoots the Dragon in 2007

In summer 2007, Dragojević started shooting the historical melodrama St. George Shoots the Dragon, an ambitious and expensive movie based on Dušan Kovačević's script about a love triangle against the backdrop of Serbian war effort in World War I. Funded in significant part by the governments of Serbia and Republika Srpska, the movie raised a lot of media interest in Serbia. It was by far the biggest movie project Dragojević had ever been a part of. The making of the movie, however, wasn't smooth. From Sergej Trifunović being fired as the lead and replaced with Milutin Milošević to cinematographer Miljen "Kreka" Kljaković walking off the project, the Serbian press detailed many of the on-set problems. In the end, as the film was about to go into theater release in Serbia in mid-March 2009 even Dragojević himself admitted personal disappointment with some of the choices he made during the shooting of the film in a lengthy interview for Vreme magazine. Among other things he said: "I invested so much energy into this film that I started to believe it would become a masterpiece, but it hasn't."

In late 2010, Dragan Bjelogrlić's film Montevideo, Bog te video that Dragojević co-wrote with Ranko Božić came out to positive reviews and great commercial success. Simultaneously, Dragojević's political engagement in the Socialist Party of Serbia (SPS), a part of the ruling coalition in Serbia, was announced.

In late October 2011, Dragojević's latest film Parada premiered. Covering the politically sensitive topic of gay rights in Serbia, the film generated some controversy leading up to the premiere. For his part, Dragojević boldly announced it as "the best film of my career", and soon expanded on the statement: "Saying that was the result of my satisfaction with the fact I succeeded in controlling a very risky thing - to continuously balance between the concepts of 'high comedy' and 'high drama' and to purposely impact the viewer's limbic system, thus manipulating and drawing emotions I deem necessary for every segment of the movie all of which results in the emotional and cognitive reaction I planned".

== Filmography ==
Year	Film	Director	Writer	Producer	Awards / Notes
1992	We Are Not Angels	Yes	Yes	No	
1994	Slatko od snova	No	Yes	No	
1994	Dva sata kvalitetnog TV programa	Yes	No	Yes	TV movie
1995	Otvorena vrata	Yes	No	No	TV series, directed several episodes
1996	Pretty Village, Pretty Flame	Yes	Yes	No	International Jury Award at São Paulo International Film Festival
1998	The Wounds	Yes	Yes	No	Bronze Horse Award at Stockholm Film Festival
2005	Mi nismo anđeli 2	Yes	No	Yes	
2006	Mi nismo anđeli 3: Rock & roll uzvraća udarac	No	Yes	Yes	
2009	St. George Shoots the Dragon	Yes	No	Yes	Best Artistic Contribution Award at Montréal World Film Festival
2010	Montevideo, Bog te video	No	Yes	No	
2011	Parada	Yes	Yes	Yes	Three awards at Berlin International Film Festival
2014	Atomski zdesna	Yes	Yes	Yes	
2020	Zastoj	No	No	Yes	
2021	Nebesa	Yes	Yes	No	

== Political career ==
[Joining] the SPS is a logical choice, the only one for me. The fact that we used to be on the opposing sides is not something I see as a problem. On the contrary, it's proof that people can change—for the better. The fact that me and some of the people I supported back in the 1990s are now on the opposing sides [politically]—is what I see as a bigger problem. If we want to advance forward [as a society], and I don't think I'm alone in thinking this way, we have to leave behind both the 1990s as well as the decade that came after the 5th of October.

— Dragojević in December 2010 about his entry into Serbian politics via joining the Socialist Party of Serbia (SPS).

In December 2010, Dragojević's association with Ivica Dačić's Socialist Party of Serbia (SPS) was announced via the forty-seven-year-old film director's appointment to the party's main board. Other appointees to the party's main board on the same occasion were: table tennis player Aleksandar Karakašević, LGBT activist Boris Milićević, actor Bata Živojinović, retired long-distance runner and former Olympian Franjo Mihalić, and retired handballer Svetlana Kitić. When Dragojević joined, the SPS had already been a participant in the Democratic Party (DS)-dominated multiple-party ruling coalition, closely aligned with and controlled by the Serbian President and DS leader Boris Tadić. Considering the SPS was founded and formerly headed by Slobodan Milošević—whom Dragojević had been an outspoken critic of—many in the Serbian public found the established film director's decision to join the party surprising and peculiar. In his media appearances, Dragojević placed his motivation to become politically active in the context of improving Serbian cultural policies, bringing up the "sale of Beograd Film, sorry state of Avala Film, and closure of the National Museum since 2003" as examples of things he'll try to change. He further opined that the SPS had changed since the days when Milošević headed it before stating "revival of closed cultural centers in small towns across Serbia" as his main goal in joining it while adding that the SPS was "the only party interested in my plan".

In late March 2012, Dragojević's name was submitted in the 55th spot on the party's electoral 250-person list for the 2012 parliamentary elections. In addition to the SPS members, the list also included candidates from the Party of United Pensioners of Serbia (PUPS) and United Serbia (JS). Dragojević took an active part in the electoral campaign, making TV debate show and public rally appearances. The SPS-PUPS-JS list ended up winning 44 parliamentary seats, which meant Dragojević didn't get the deputy (MP) status in the Serbian parliament. Following the election, the coalition around the Serbian Progressive Party (SNS) together with the SPS list, formed a government with Dačić as Prime Minister and Aleksandar Vučić as the First Deputy Prime Minister.

However, year and a half later, Dragojević would get the MP status. Following the August 2013 cabinet reshuffle, two SPS MPs—Branko Ružić and Aleksandar Antić—resigned their parliamentary posts due to being appointed to ministerial positions in the prime minister Ivica Dačić's and deputy PM Aleksandar Vučić's reconstructed cabinet. Ružić's and Antić's vacated parliamentary positions were thus taken over by Milutin Mrkonjić and Srđan Dragojević. In January 2014, Dragojević was criticized by his cinematic collaborator Dragan Bjelogrlić over accepting the parliamentary job: "I wish he hadn't done it. That ambiance doesn't go with him at all. He's greater than all of them. The MP post is not a degrading one per se, but when I think back to Dragojević the punk rocker or back to the 1990s when he'd quite brusquely, and often brazenly, say things straight to people's faces, now he looks like a wild boar that's been tamed and placed in the parliamentary cage".

In March 2017, Dragojević got kicked out of the SPS after publicly voicing support for the opposition candidate Saša Janković at the 2017 Serbian presidential election.

In February 2022, Dragojević became the cultural advisor to the opposition candidate Zdravko Ponoš at the 2022 Serbian presidential election.

== Personal life ==
Dragojević was married to costume designer and visual artist Tatjana Strugar from 1988 to 2005. They have three children: daughters Irina and Eva, and son Matija.

He's married to architect Jelena Ignjatov. The couple have two children, daughter Vera and son Aleksa.
