= Maja Mandžuka =

Serbian actress

- Born: 27 February 1982 (age 44); Belgrade, SR Serbia, SFR Yugoslavia
- Citizenship: Serbian
- Occupation: Actress
- Years active: 2001–present
- Website: www.majamandzuka.com

Maja Mandžuka (Serbian Cyrillic: Маја Манџука, born 27 February 1982) is a popular Serbian movie actress. She is best known for her roles as Kata in the Serbian hit movie "Munje!" (Dudes or Thunderbolts) (2001), and Senka in Virtualna Stvarnost (Virtual Reality) (2001).

== Early life and education ==
Mandžuka was born in Belgrade, SFR Yugoslavia (now Serbia), to movie producer and professor of The Belgrade Academy of Dramatic Arts Danka Mandžuka, and lawyer, writer and painter Zlatko Mandžuka. She has an older sister, Mila. Mandžuka spent most of her childhood in Belgrade, but moved to Cyprus with her family at age 11 where she lived for three years and graduated from elementary school at the English Grammar School. It was during these years that she perfected her English. She later moved back to Belgrade where she went to the 14th Belgrade Gymnasium High School. It was during this period that she started acting in domestic movies. Having achieved success in Serbia, and wanting to continue her education. Mandžuka graduated at University of Art/TV and movie production in Belgrade, then in 2006 she moved to New York where she attended The Lee Strasberg Theatre and Film Institute. In 2012 she completed the Bernard Hiller Masterclass in Los Angeles, where she moved to in 2010 to pursue an international career.

== Career ==
Mandžuka 's first public appearance came at the age of 12, when she was selected as a model for a New Year's edition of Greek magazine "Selides". Her first stage performance came one year later in Cyprus, at age 13, in a theatrical production of Alice in Wonderland. Mandžuka got her first movie role at age 15 in a movie called "Virtualna stvarnost" (Virtual Reality) for which she was cast for the lead role of Senka taking the center stage in the movie alongside legendary Serbian actor Dragan Nikolic and actress Sonja Savic. She received numerous domestic nominations and awards for her performance as a drug addicted teenager in this movie which was sponsored by the Serbian Ministry of Culture as a campaign for the fight against drugs in the youth population. She capped of her award season with the newcoming actress of the year award.

Her most popular performance came in 2001 with the lead female role of Kata in the Serbian hit movie Munje! (Dudes or Thunderbolts). The movie broke all theater attendance records in Serbia and propelled Mandžuka to stardom at the age of 19. The movie was the first Serbian mega blockbuster of the new millennium and is considered a cult movie. During this time she was also playing in the popular TV show Treci Kanal od Sunca (Third Channel From the Sun).

Wanting to concentrate on completing her education before fully pursuing an international career, she made several minor appearances in independent international movies such as Empire (2003), Hell Ride (2007) and 2:22 (2008).

She was the Reebok brand Ambassador in Serbia.

== Personal life ==
Mandžuka has been involved in many humanitarian projects. The project closest to her heart, however, is a workshop for children with learning disabilities which she has been visiting regularly for many years. In 2012 she brought a news crew to do a report on the workshop and to raise the public awareness of this project and similar ones like it.

She has stated that, in the near future, she wishes to produce large Broadway theater productions in her hometown of Belgrade.

Known to be very protective and secretive about her private life. She has stated that she enjoys traveling, tennis, reading, wine tasting, spending time with friends and playing with her two nephews.
