= Baranda =

Baranda Баранда
- Village (Selo)
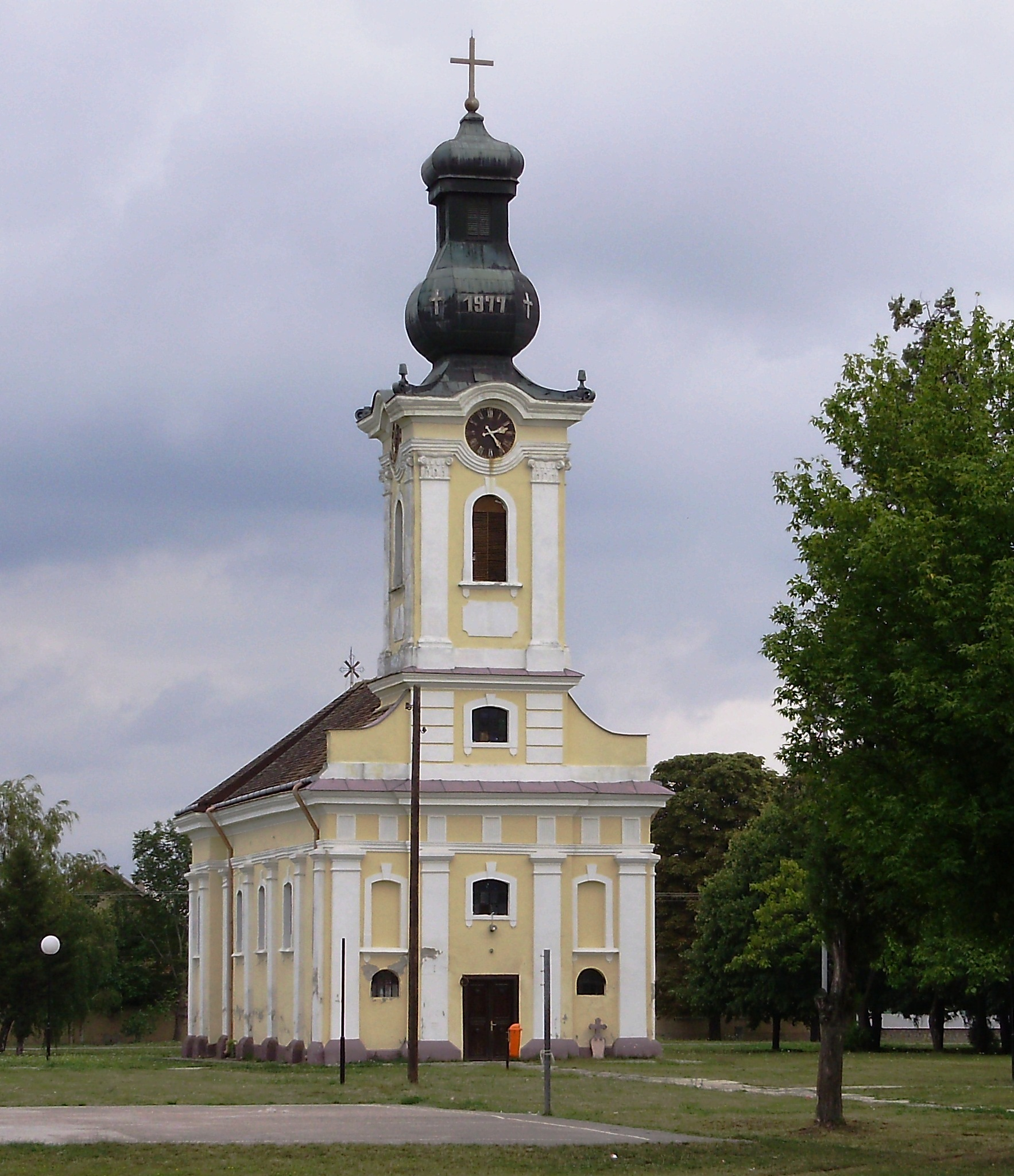
- The Orthodox Church

- Location of Baranda within Serbia Baranda (Serbia) Baranda (Europe)
- Coordinates: 45°05′04″N 20°26′22″E
- Country: Serbia
- Province: Vojvodina
- District: South Banat
- Municipality: Opovo
- Elevation: 78 m (256 ft)

Population (2011)
  - Baranda: 1,550
- Time zone: UTC+1 (CET)
  - Summer (DST): UTC+2 (CEST)
- Postal code: 26205
- Area code: +381(0)13
- Car plates: PA

Baranda (Serbian Cyrillic: Баранда) is a village in Serbia. It is situated in the Opovo municipality, South Banat District, Vojvodina province. The village has a Serb ethnic majority (93.56%) and its population numbering 1,550 people. The village was a center point of the popular television series "Vratiće se rode" (English: The Storks Will Return).

== Historical population ==
Baranda has been experiencing a steady but constant population decline over the decades.

- 1961: 1,841
- 1971: 1,671
- 1981: 1,656
- 1991: 1,690
- 2002: 1,688
- 2011: 1,550

== Notable people ==
- Dragan Veselinov, politician and former minister of agriculture

== See also ==
- List of places in Serbia
- List of cities, towns and villages in Vojvodina
