= Darko Bajić =

Serbian film director

- Born: 14 May 1955 (age 71); Belgrade, Serbia
- Occupation: Film director
- Years active: 1981–present

Darko Bajić (born on 14 May 1955) is a Serbian film director. He directed many movies and TV series popular within the Serbian audience such as War Live, The Black Bomber, Sivi dom and Zaboravljeni.

== Filmography ==
- Sivi dom (1985), TV series
- Zaboravljeni (1989), TV series
- The Black Bomber (1992), film
- Balkanska pravila (1997), politicki triler
- War Live (2000), film
