= Mrđenovac =

Mrđenovac Мрђеновац (Serbian)
- Village (Selo)
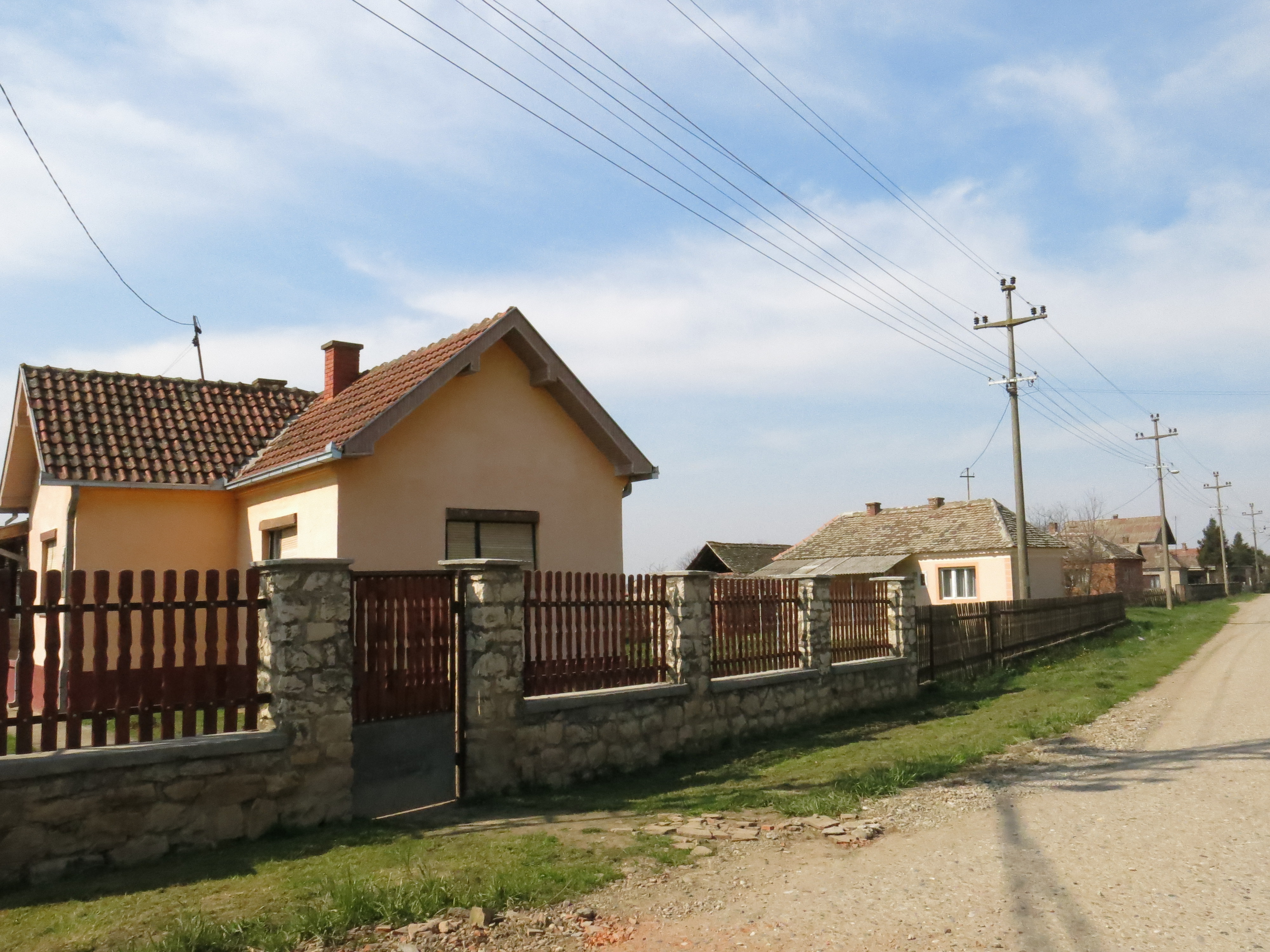

- Location within Serbia
- Coordinates: 44°44′N 19°48′E
- Country: Serbia
- Time zone: UTC+1 (CET)
  - Summer (DST): UTC+2 (CEST)

Mrđenovac (Serbian: Мрђеновац) is a village in Serbia. It is situated in the Šabac municipality, in the Mačva District. The village has a Serb ethnic majority and its population numbering 697 people (2002 census).

== See also ==
- List of places in Serbia
