= Dušan Kovačević =

Serbian playwright, scriptwriter, film director and academic (born 1948)

- Душан Ковачевић
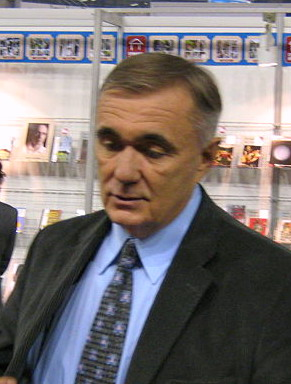
- Dušan Kovačević at the Belgrade Book Fair, 22 October 2007
- Born: 12 July 1948 (age 78); Mrđenovac, FPR Yugoslavia (now Serbia)
- Education: University of Belgrade
- Occupations: playwright and theatre director

Dušan Kovačević (Serbian Cyrillic: Душан Ковачевић, pronounced [dǔʃan koʋǎːtʃeʋitɕ]; born 12 July 1948) is a Serbian playwright, scriptwriter, film director and academic best known for his theatre plays and movie scripts. He also served as the ambassador of Serbia in Lisbon, Portugal.

== Biography ==
Kovačević was born in Mrđenovac near Šabac, PR Serbia, FPR Yugoslavia, graduated from Svetozar Marković Gymnasium in Novi Sad, and received a bachelor's degree in dramaturgy from the University of Belgrade in 1973. From 1973, he worked as a dramaturge at TV Beograd for five years. Since 1998, he has been the artistic director of Zvezdara teatar. In 2003 he directed his first movie, Profesionalac (The Professional).

Kovačević's work is known and popular in Serbia. His comedies have been translated into 20 languages, but his work didn't become available in English until the mid-1990s.

A declared royalist, Dušan Kovačević is a member of the Crown Council of Aleksandar Karađorđević. He is also a member of the Serbian Academy of Sciences and Arts. In 2020, he was awarded the Sretenje order of the Republic of Serbia.

His daughter Lena Kovačević is a jazz singer.

== Selected works ==
=== Plays ===
- Radovan Treći - Radovan III (1973)
- Maratonci trče počasni krug - The Marathon Runners Run a Victory Lap of Honor (1973)
- Proleće u januaru - The Spring in January (1977)
- Sabirni centar - The Gathering Place (1982)
- Balkanski špijun - Balkan Spy (1982)
- Sveti Georgije ubiva aždahu - St. George Shoots the Dragon (1984)
- Klaustofobična Komedija - Claustrophobic Comedy (1987)
- Profesionalac - The Professional (1990)
- Urnebesna Tragedija - Roaring Tragedy (also translated as Tragedy Burlesque; 1990)
- Lari Tompson, tragedija jedne mladosti - Larry Thompson, the Tragedy of a Youth (1996)
- Kontejner sa Pet Zvezdica - Five-Star Dumpster (1999)
- Doktor Šuster - Doctor Shoemaker (2001)
- Generalna proba samoubistva - Dress Rehearsal for a Suicide (2009)
- Život u tesnim cipelama - Life in tight shoes (2011)
- Kumovi - Godfathers (2013)
- Rođendan gospodina Nušića - The birthday of Mr Nušić (2014)
- Hipnoza jedne ljubavi - Hypnosis of one love (2016)

=== Screenplays ===
- Bestije,1977
- Poseban tretman, 1980 (Special Treatment)
- Ko to tamo peva, 1980 (Who's Singing Over There?)
- Maratonci trče počasni krug, 1982 (The Marathon Runners Run a Victory Lap of Honor)
- Balkanski špijun, 1984 (Balkan Spy)
- Sabirni Centar, 1989 (The Gathering Place)
- Pod zemlja, 1995 (Underground), directed by Emir Kusturica, won the Palme d'Or at Cannes Film Festival.

His adaptation of his play called Proleće u januaru (Spring in January).

- Profesionalac, 2003 (The Professional), also director.
- Sveti Georgije ubiva aždahu, 2003 (St. George Kills the Dragon)
- Nije loše biti čovek, 2021 Not Bad to be a Human, also director.

His adaptation of his play Kumovi.

=== Poetry ===
- Ja to tamo pevam (2020)

== See also ==
- List of Ambassadors from Serbia
