= Hôpital Paul-Brousse =

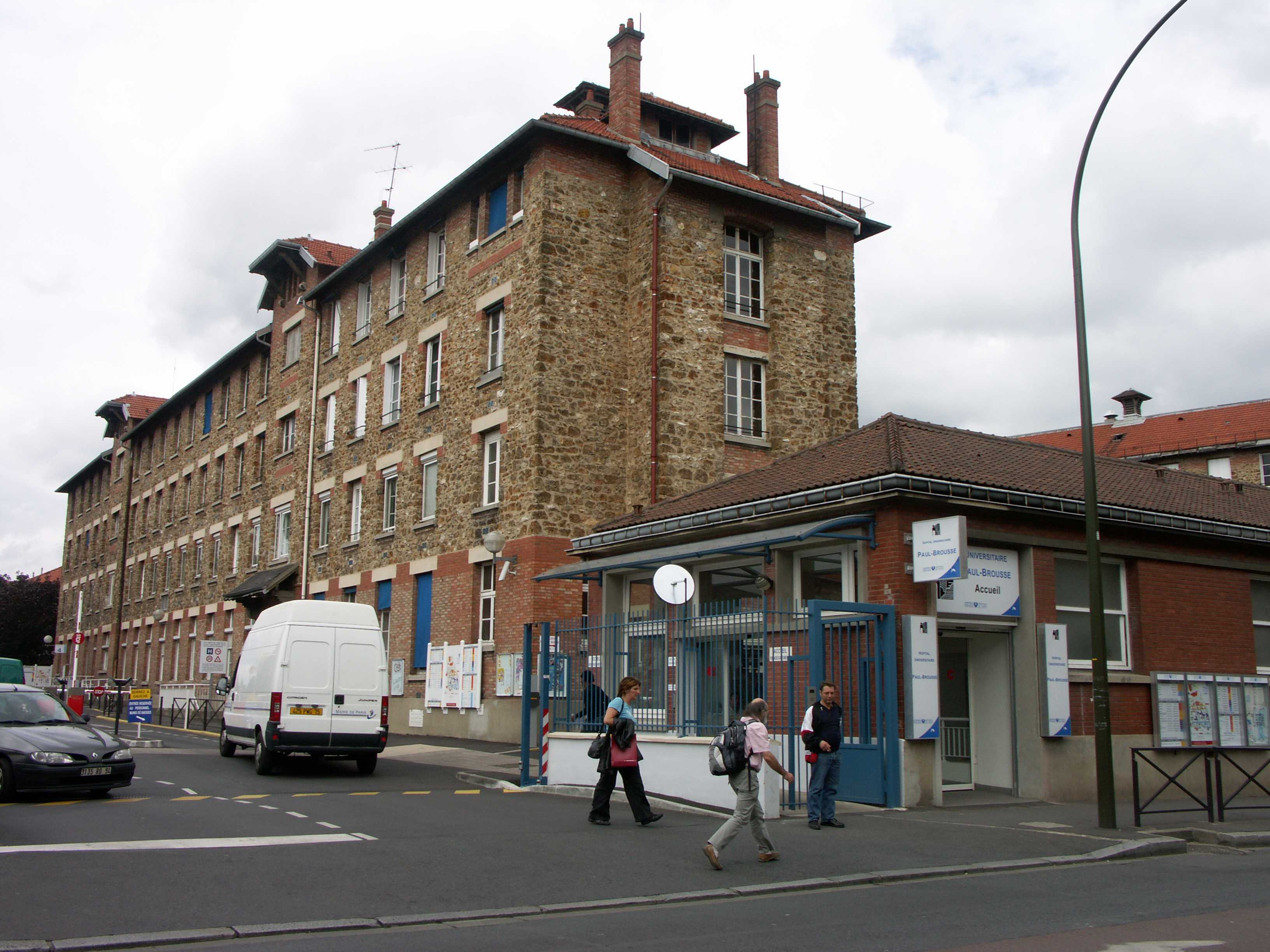
- Main entrance to the hospital

Geography
- Location: Villejuif, Val-de-Marne, France
- Coordinates: 48°47′45″N 2°21′42″E

Links
- Lists: Hospitals in France

Hôpital Paul-Brousse is a hospital in Villejuif, Val-de-Marne, France. It is named after Paul Brousse, a French socialist.

Marc Zelter MD and Daniel Vittecoq MD were professors in this hospital.

Camille Loiseau, the Doyenne de France from March 26, 2005 to August 12, 2006, died at the Hôpital Paul-Brousse.
