= Dragan Bjelogrlić =

Serbian actor and film director (born 1963)

- Драган Бјелогрлић
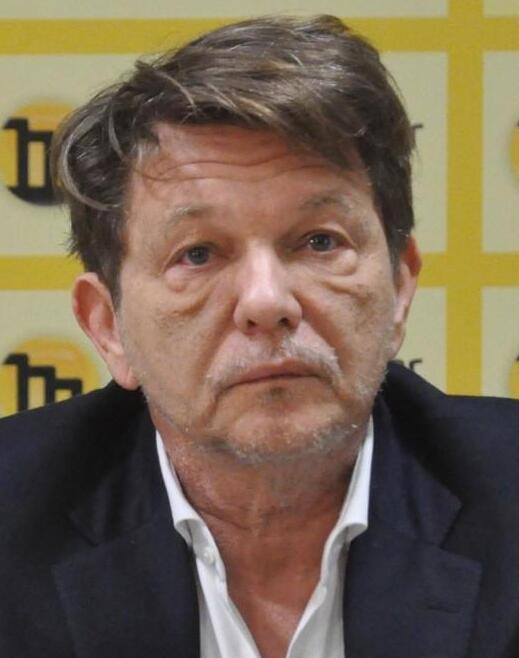
- Bjelogrlić in 2023
- Born: 10 October 1963 (age 63); Opovo, SR Serbia, SFR Yugoslavia
- Other name: Bjela
- Occupations: Actor, director, producer
- Spouse: Maja Bjelogrlić (m. 1996)
- Website: www.cobrafilm.com/bjelogrlic

Dragan "Bjela" Bjelogrlić (Serbian Cyrillic: Драган "Бјела" Бјелогрлић, pronounced [drǎɡan bjěːla bjelǒɡr̩litɕ]; born 10 October 1963) is a Yugoslav actor, director and producer.

== Career ==
Bjelogrlić made his acting debut as a 15-year old, playing Sava Jovanović Sirogojno in Boško Buha, a 1978 film that achieved sizable popularity.

He followed that up in the coming years with other roles in TV series, short, and feature films. By the mid-1980s, Bjelogrlić was an established young actor in SFR Yugoslavia. In 1985 he appeared in Bal na vodi as part of an ensemble cast featuring Srđan Todorović, Nebojša Bakočević, Goran Radaković, and Gala Videnović.

In 1987, he became one of the central cast members on the hugely popular drama television series Bolji život, playing the role of Boba Popadić. His brother Goran Bjelogrlić is a film producer. His 2010 film, Montevideo, God Bless You!, was selected as the Serbian entry for the Best Foreign Language Film at the 84th Academy Awards, but did not make the final shortlist. The film's sequel, See You in Montevideo, was released in 2014.

== Awards and recognition ==
- Best acting couple (with Vesna Trivalić) at the festival in Niš for the series Bolji život 1991.
- Two grand prizes "Ćele-kula" for the best actor in the film Lepa sela lepo gore at the acting festival in Niš
- Two Golden Mimosas, for best acting role in the film Lepa sela lepo gore]at the Herceg Novi Film Festival
- Statue of Liberty for the best acting achievement at Sopot Film Festival for the role in film Lepa sela lepo gore 1996.
- Charter Award for Outstanding Male Role in Doktor Rej i đavoli
- Golden Antenna for the best screenplay for Montevideo, God Bless You!
- Audience Award in Moscow for the film See You in Montevideo
- Award for contribution to European cinematography at the 10th European and Mediterranean Film Festival in Piran (2020)

== Selected filmography ==
=== As actor ===
Year	Title	Role	Notes
1978	Boško Buha	Sava Jovanović Sirogojno	
1987	Dancing in Water	Saša	
1992	The Black Bomber	Crni bombarder	
1996	Pretty Village, Pretty Flame	Milan	
1998	The Wounds	Čika Kure	
2000	War Live	Sergej	
2012	Doctor Ray and the Devils	Ratko Dražević	
2014	Monument to Michael Jackson	Dusan	
2018	South Wind	Car	
2023	Guardians of the Formula	Leka Ranković	

=== As director ===
Year	Title	Notes
2010	Montevideo, God Bless You!	
2014	See You in Montevideo	
2021	Toma	
2023	Guardians of the Formula	

=== Television ===
Year	Title	Role	Notes
1987-1991	A Better Life	Slobodan "Boba" Popadić	TV series
2004-2007	Crna hronika	Goran Latinović	TV series
2007-2008	The Storks Will Return	Aleksandar Vrancov "Ekser"	TV series

== See also ==
- Cinema of Serbia
