= Pretty Village, Pretty Flame =

1996 Serbian film

- DVD cover
- Directed by: Srđan Dragojević
- Written by: Vanja Bulić; Srđan Dragojević; Biljana Maksić; Nikola Pejaković
- Based on: A war report in Duga by Vanja Bulić
- Produced by: Dragan Bjelogrlić; Goran Bjelogrlić; Milko Josifov; Nikola Kojo
- Starring: Dragan Bjelogrlić; Nikola Kojo; Bata Živojinović; Zoran Cvijanović; Milorad Mandić; Nikola Pejaković
- Cinematography: Dušan Joksimović
- Edited by: Petar Marković
- Music by: Aleksandar Habić; Laza Ristovski
- Production companies: RTS; Ministry of Culture; Cobra Films
- Release date: May 1996
- Running time: 129 minutes
- Country: Yugoslavia
- Languages: Serbian; English

Pretty Village, Pretty Flame (Serbian: Лепа села лепо горе / Lepa sela lepo gore, literally "Pretty villages burn nicely") is a 1996 Serbian film directed by Srđan Dragojević with a screenplay based on a book written by Vanja Bulić.

Set during the Bosnian War, the film tells the story of Milan, part of a small group of Serb soldiers trapped in a tunnel by a Bosniak force. Through flashbacks, the lives of the trapped soldiers in pre-war Yugoslavia are shown, particularly Milan and his Bosniak best friend Halil becoming enemies after having to pick opposing sides in the conflict.

== Summary ==
The plot is inspired by a real-life occurrence in eastern Bosnia from the opening stages of the Bosnian War, with the film's screenplay based on a Vanja Bulić-written, Duga magazine published long-form piece about the actual event. Following the success of the movie, Bulić wrote a novel named Tunel—essentially an expanded version of his magazine article.

The film features a non-linear plot line, and the scenes cut back and forth throughout the 1971 to 1999 time period in no particular order. The main timeframe includes the "present" with a hospitalized Milan, with flashbacks to both his childhood and his early adulthood in the 1980s until the war begins, and subsequent service as a soldier where he is trapped in the tunnel.

== Plot ==
The film opens with a faux newsreel—presented as a sardonic allusion to the Yugoslav state-owned Filmske novosti news organization's tone and delivery—reporting on the 27 June 1971 opening ceremony of the Tunnel of Brotherhood and Unity near an unnamed village in the Goražde municipality in eastern SR Bosnia-Herzegovina, constituent unit of the Yugoslav Federation. The tunnel is being opened by the visiting top local Bosnian communist dignitary Džemal Bijedić as the newsreel's voiceover is extolling the quality of tunnel's masonry in hyperbolically glowing terms, gushing over the completed infrastructure project representing a key development for the area's economic progress. During the ribbon-cutting ceremony, Bijedić (or "Comrade Džemo" as he's referred to in the newsreel) accidentally cuts his thumb with the scissors.

Cut to 1980, not even a decade after its opening, the tunnel has already fallen into disrepair as two local children from the nearby village, Milan and Halil, are playing in its vicinity. They don't dare go inside the tunnel, recalling a local tall tale to one another while staring into the dilapidated structure: "drekavac (an ogre from Slavic mythology) sleeps inside and if he awakens he would kill everyone in the village and burn down their homes".

Cut forward to the spring of 1992, as sporadic violent incidents that would eventually spiral into an all-out war are taking place throughout Bosnia, Milan (Dragan Bjelogrlić), a Serb, and his best friend Halil (Nikola Pejaković), a Muslim Bosniak, both in their late teens, are still in their ethnically-mixed village in eastern Bosnia, playing one-on-one streetball on a makeshift hoop in front of a kafana owned by another Serb villager Slobo (Petar Božović). Although the two friends are still very warm and affable towards each other, the talk of war is in the air and a degree of tension along ethnoreligious lines is felt, indicating mutual mistrust and apprehension among their respective ethnic groups. As Milan and Halil are taking a break from playing ball while having a drink in front of Slobo's kafana, Halil and Slobo engage in a testy conversation the starting point of which is news from Sarajevo about a Muslim attacking a Serb wedding procession and killing the groom's father. Rather than commenting on the tragic event directly, Halil focuses on the medium that informed Slobo of this hate crime, a Serbian daily newspaper, Večernje novosti, before implicitly dismissing the paper as a Serb propaganda tool and cynically suggesting to Slobo that he should instead be reading Oslobođenje, a Bosnian daily that Slobo in turn dismisses as Muslim propaganda in a sarcastic retort. Furthermore, Nazim, a Muslim neighbour of Slobo's, rolls up in a car and trailer with his family and many of their personal belongings in tow, asking Slobo to look after his house while he is away "visiting his sister in Tuzla". Halil makes a snide comment, suggesting Nazim's fleeing the coming war rather than simply visiting relatives, which Nazim denies unconvincingly.

Another cut to a few years later, a wounded Milan is shown in a hospital bed among other wounded soldiers at the Military Medical Academy (VMA) in Belgrade, where he taunts a wounded young POW Muslim soldier in the neighbouring room, whom he threatens to kill if his friend in the next bed dies.

In 1994, during the conflict, Milan joins the Army of Republika Srpska (VRS) and is attached to a squad that includes:

- Velja (Nikola Kojo): a career criminal from Belgrade who had been committing most of his break-ins and burglaries abroad in West Germany. The way he ended up in war is purely coincidental. During a brief visit home, the authorities showed up at the door to conscript his younger brother, a promising university student. Knowing full well his brother would have likely been taken to the front lines for draft-dodging, Velja decides on the spot to pretend to be his brother thus becoming a soldier in his place.
- Petar "Professor" (Dragan Maksimović): a Bosnian Serb school teacher from Banja Luka holding nostalgic feelings towards SFR Yugoslavia. While some of the others loot houses, he is more interested in literature and intermittently reads from a burnt diary he found in one of the villages the squad passed through.
- Brzi "Speedy" (Zoran Cvijanović): a heroin addict from Belgrade, son of a Yugoslav People's Army (JNA) colonel and the only one in the group who speaks English. While high on drugs one night, he walked to a highway overpass in Belgrade where the people have gathered to cheer on the troops going to war, jumping off only to land in a JNA truck headed towards the Croatian border. It is left ambiguous whether the jump was a suicide attempt. Brzi was given an ambulance truck to drive and he now sees his involvement in the war as an attempt to get himself off drugs.
- Laza (Dragan Petrović): a simple-minded and impressionable family man with traditional values from a village in Central Serbia. Laza was so outraged by a Serbian TV news report about atrocities against Serbs that he walked to the nearest highway and hitchhiked to Belgrade to volunteer for combat. On the way there, he vents his anger to the truck driver that picked him up, telling him proudly and defiantly that "never again shall a German or Turk [be allowed to] set foot here" (referencing past Nazi and Ottoman occupations of Serbia, respectively), blissfully unaware that the person behind the wheel is a Turkish trucker driving through Serbia.
- Viljuška "Fork" (Milorad Mandić): a cheerful and jovial Chetnik sympathizer villager from Central Serbia whose only motive for fighting was looking out for his brother-in-law Laza. He is nicknamed Fork because he carries a fork around his neck symbolizing Serbian sophistication in the 14th century, and contrasts Serbian kings to English and German kings at the time, who he says ate using their hands.
- Captain Gvozden (Bata Živojinović): the squad's commander and a professionally trained Yugoslav People's Army officer. Although fighting for the Serbian side, in his heart he still believes in Yugoslavia and its ideals. In 1980, after the death of Yugoslav president Josip Broz Tito, Gvozden made the national news when he had run a 350-kilometer marathon alone across the country to attend Tito's funeral.
- Marko (Marko Kovijanić): a young man who is often foolishly and desperately seeking the approval of his older colleagues. He is shown to be very fond of foreign culture; he drew a graffiti of a Serb three-finger salute with the caption saying "Srbija do Tokija" ("Serbia to Tokyo") on the wall of an abandoned house in a war-torn Bosniak village, later holding a Confederate flag when leaving the Bosniak village sitting on top of an M53/59 Praga, and he always wear a headband with the Chinese character for "dragon" (龍) on it.

Milan, disturbed with the way the war is being conducted, is frustrated by the fact that war profiteers are looting Halil's property. Milan shoots three of the profiteers out of anger after they set fire to the auto-repair shop he and Halil had built together, wounding them, and is then shocked to find Slobo is looting the property too. Later, Slobo tells him that his mother has been killed by Bosniaks from Halil's squad, and Milan returns to home to find it vandalized with Bosniak nationalist graffiti and covered in his mother's blood. After the squad set a village on fire, they watch it burn and Velja says: "Pretty villages are pretty when they burn. Ugly villages stay ugly, even when they burn." (in Serbian, "Lepa sela lepo gore, a ružna sela ostaju ružna, čak i kad gore".) At night Milan and his squad are encircled by Bosniak fighters, telling his surviving squad mates to run to a nearby tunnel he was scared of entering as a child, believed to be home to a drekavac. Milan, Velja, Professor, Fork, Laza, and Gvozden enter the tunnel and fight off the Bosniak fighters, however the group become trapped as they will be shot if they leave. Attempting to contact their allies, the Bosniaks taunt them using Marko's radio, who they are torturing. Shortly afterwards, Speedy crashes his truck into the tunnel, with Liza Linel (Lisa Moncure) an American reporter for CBC News who had sneaked into the back of the truck, and the two also become trapped.

The squad stays inside the tunnel for a week but the lack of food and water, as well as the unlikelihood of military backup, takes it toll. Laza is mortally wounded when trying to throw a grenade. Velja tries to leave the tunnel with the intention of dying and is shot, the others bring him back. The Bosniak force surrounding them then announce they are sending a woman to the squad "for their enjoyment" who is revealed to be Milan and Halil's former school teacher who has been sexually abused. As she walks towards them slowly, they decide to shoot her before she gets too close, fearing explosives have been attached to her. None of them can do it until Fork shoots her, then, having had enough of the war, he attempts to leave the tunnel but is killed. They plot an escape from the tunnel, with a wounded Velja committing suicide so as not to slow them down. Milan recognizes the voice on the radio as Halil, and the two communicate shortly before the Bosniaks attack the tunnel. Gvozden drives the truck out of the tunnel at full speed (while singing Uz Maršala Tita) before exploding from fires lit at the entrance, killing Gvozden and the troops attacking the tunnel, allowing the others to leave. On the way out Speedy is wounded by a stray bullet and Liza is killed by shrapnel from a grenade while attempting to retrieve her camera. Milan and Halil meet outside, where Halil asks who burned down his garage while Milan asks who killed his mother - both men deny being involved before Halil is then killed by a Serb artillery strike.

Milan, Professor, and Speedy escape and all three are sent to the Belgrade military hospital, where Speedy is the friend in the bed next to Milan. Speedy briefly wakes up, but eventually dies, and the following night Milan tries to kill the Bosniak boy as promised, despite being unable to walk. Milan crawls into the next room, followed by an equally disabled Professor trying to stop him. As Milan goes to stab the boy with a fork, he cannot bring himself to do it, and is discovered by the nurses. An imaginary scene then shows the tunnel full of dead bodies, including Milan and Halil, being witnessed by them as children.

The film closes on 21 July 1999 with a newsreel, showing the re-opening of the reconstructed tunnel under the new name: the Tunnel of Peace. Mirroring the films opening, the scissors used to cut through the ribbon also cut the users thumb.

== Production ==
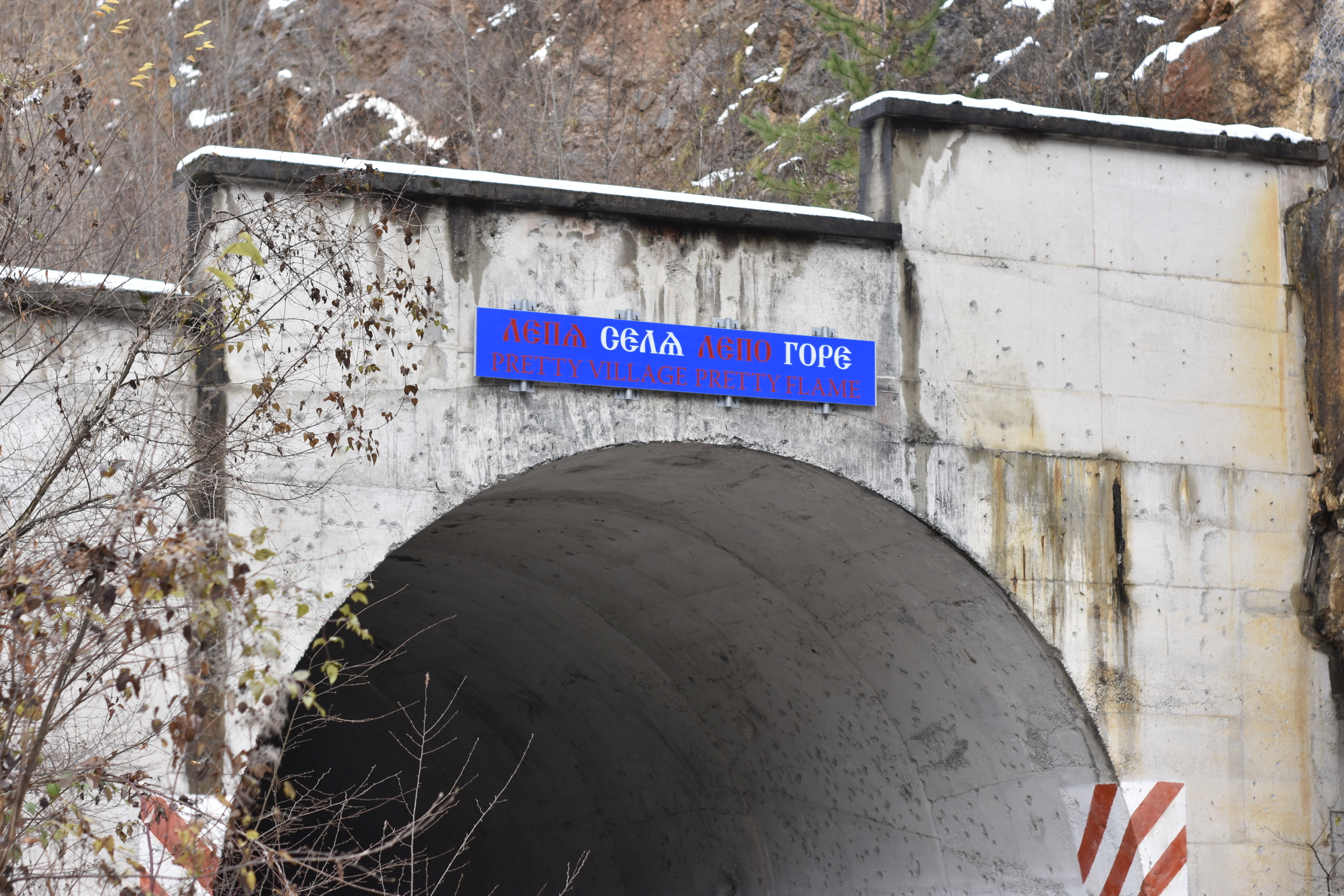
The real location of the tunnel where the movie was shot. The plaque above the entrance has the movie's title written in both Serbian and English

The funds for the movie were raised through Cobra Film Department, a legal entity that was registered as a limited liability company by Nikola Kojo, Dragan Bjelogrlić, Goran Bjelogrlić, and Milko Josifov. Most of the money came from the Serbian government's (under prime minister Mirko Marjanović) Ministry of Culture (headed by cabinet minister Nada Perišić-Popović) as well as from the Serbian state television RTS. Reportedly, the budget raised was US$2 million.

The shooting of the film under the working title Tunel began on 19 April 1995. The majority of the scenes were shot on locations in and around Višegrad, Republika Srpska (Serb inhabited entity of Bosnia and Herzegovina, still governed by Radovan Karadžić) at the time, often in places that were former battlefields. In July 1995, after 85 shooting days, the production was put on hold due to lack of funds, some 7 planned shooting days short of completion. Following a new round of fund-raising, the production resumed in mid-November 1995 and finished by early 1996.

According to Dragojević, the movie's title is paraphrased from a passage describing burning villages in the distance in Louis-Ferdinand Céline's 1932 novel Voyage au bout de la nuit, a literary work that had a strong impact on Dragojević when he read it in his early youth.

== Release and reaction ==
The film won accolades for direction, acting, and brutally realistic portrayal of the war in former Yugoslavia. It was also the first Serbian film to show the Serbian side of the conflict, one which involved numerous atrocities and massacres on all sides (most notably the Srebrenica genocide perpetrated by Serbians) – the title of the film being ironic comment on the protagonists' activities in a Bosnian village.

Almost 800,000 people went to see the film in cinemas across Serbia, which equated to approximately 8% of the country's total population. The film was selected as the Serbian entry for the Best Foreign Language Film at the 69th Academy Awards, but was not accepted as a nominee.

In addition to FR Yugoslavia (Serbia and Montenegro), the only other former Yugoslav countries where the movie had an official theatrical distribution were Slovenia and Macedonia. Released in Slovenia as Lepe vasi lepo gorijo, it became a hit in the country with 72,000 admission tickets sold. In Macedonia it also posted a good box office result with more than 50,000 admission tickets sold.

The Venice Film Festival refused the film with its director Gillo Pontecorvo calling it "fascist cinema". Earlier that year, Berlin and Cannes film festivals also rejected the film.

Writing for Sight & Sound in November 1996, British author Misha Glenny delivered a stinging attack on critics who view Pretty Village, Pretty Flame or Emir Kusturica's Underground through a simplistic, reductionist pro- or anti-Serb critical lens.

The film was broadcast on Swedish public service television under the name Vackra byar ("beautiful villages").

Even before wider distribution in North America, the film received notices in major American newspapers such as Los Angeles Times and Toledo Blade, which covered it from the Bosnian War angle.

=== Continued reaction ===
In the early 2000s, while promoting his film No Man's Land, Bosniak director and former soldier in the Army of the Republic of Bosnia and Herzegovina during the war Danis Tanović called Pretty Village, Pretty Flame "well made, but ethically problematic due to its shameful portrayal of the war in Bosnia".

== Reception ==
=== Critical response ===
The film's critical reception in North America was very positive. It got plenty of press coverage following its debut showings at festivals in Montreal and Toronto.

Variety's Emanuel Levy penned a glowing review calling the film "wilder in its black humor than MASH, bolder in its vision of politics and the military than any movie Stanley Kubrick has made, and one of the most audacious antiwar statements ever committed to the big screen".

Ken Fox of TV Guide praised Dragojević for "ultimately refusing to deal in heroes and villains and never shying away from self-condemnation" while concluding that Pretty Village, Pretty Flame is "a bloody, uncompromising and surprisingly enthralling piece of antiwar film-making that pulls no punches and demands to be seen".

In his very favourable 1997 review, American online film critic James Berardinelli labelled the film "a powerful condemnation of war that shares several qualities with the German films Das Boot and Stalingrad". He awarded it 3½ stars out of 4 in his review.

The New York Times' Lawrence Van Gelder gave kudos to Dragojević for "unleashing a powerful assault on the insanity of the war that pitted Serb against Muslim in Bosnia" and praised the film as "a clear, well-meaning, universal appeal to reason".

British magazine Total Film awarded the film 4 stars out of 5, calling it "one of the most electrifying anti-war movies ever made" and further writing, "What this small, worthy film excels at is showing how even long friendships became perverted in the Bosnian conflict ... Small it may be, but it's powerfully and perfectly formed".

Shlomo Schwartzberg of Boxoffice magazine called some of the film's scenes "worthy of Vonnegut at his most hallucinatory", concluding overall that "the film is somewhat clichéd and a little more pro-Serb than necessary, but packs a genuine punch".

Gerald Peary wrote in April 1998 that Dragojević "creates a crass, unsentimental, muscular guys' world on the way to his vivid condemnation of the Bosnian War".

=== Awards and nominations ===
"Lepa sela lepo gore" garnered six wins and one nomination:

- Won European Jury Award at the Festival d'Angers (1997)
- Won Telcipro Award at the Festival d'Angers (1997)
- Won Distinguished Award of Merit at the Lauderdale International Film Festival (1996)
- Won Bronze Horse at the Stockholm International Film Festival (1996)
- Won International Jury Award at the São Paulo International Film Festival (1996)
- Won Audience Award at the Thessaloniki Film Festival (1996)
- Nominated for Golden Alexander at the Thessaloniki Film Festival (1996)

== See also ==
- List of submissions to the 69th Academy Awards for Best Foreign Language Film
- List of Serbian submissions for the Academy Award for Best Foreign Language Film
