= Seka Aleksić discography =

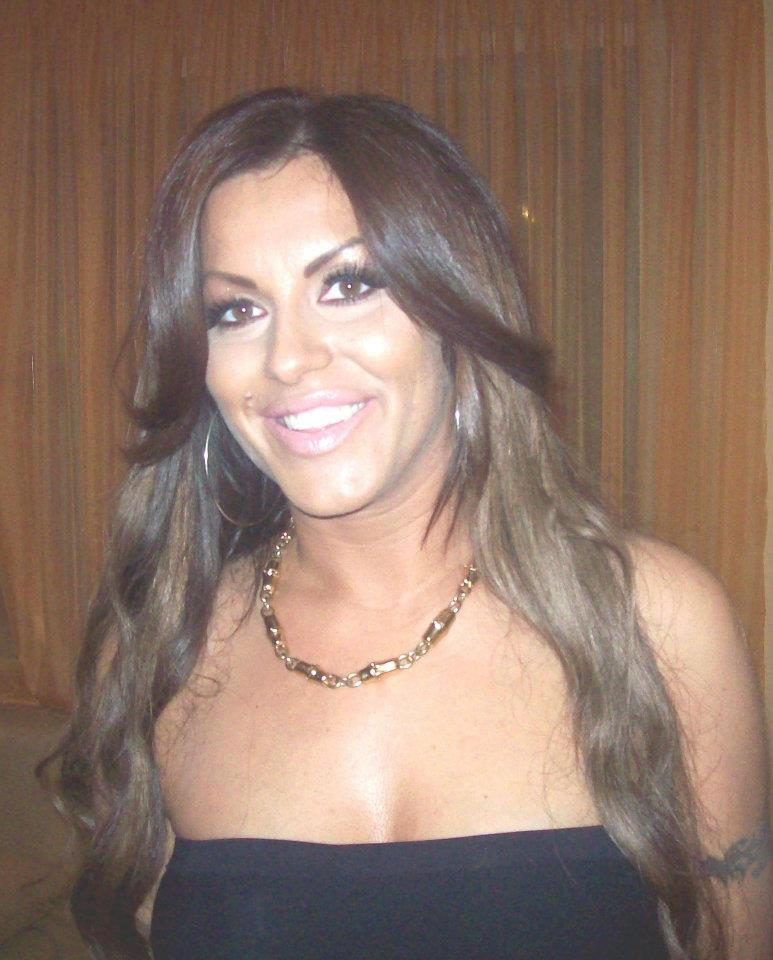
- Aleksić in 2012
- Studio albums: 10
- EPs: 4
- Live albums: 4
- Compilation albums: 4
- Singles: 20
- Music videos: 38

The discography of Serbian pop singer Seka Aleksić includes ten studio albums, four extended plays, four live albums, four compilations, twenty singles and thirty-eight music videos.

== Albums ==
=== Studio albums ===
Title	Details	Peak chart positions	Circulation	Notes
Title	Details	AUT	Circulation	Notes
Idealno tvoja	Released: 5 May 2002; Label: Grand Production; Formats: CD, cassette	—		Track listing: | No. | Title | Length | |---|---|---| | 1. | "Opet" | 3:27 | | 2. | "U kafani punoj dima" | 3:47 | | 3. | "Ne, nije" | 3:52 | | 4. | "K'o ta čaša" | 3:38 | | 5. | "Jer takva sam se rodila" | 3:04 | | 6. | "Da sam muško" | 3:54 | | 7. | "Sve je laž" | 3:41 | | 8. | "Izdajice" | 3:11 | | 9. | "Nemoj doći, ne" | 3:35 | | 10. | "Idealno tvoja" | 3:28 | | Total length: | | 35:37 |
Balkan	Released: 1 December 2003; Label: Grand Production; Formats: CD, cassette	—		Track listing: | No. | Title | Length | |---|---|---| | 1. | "Crno i zlatno" | 3:41 | | 2. | "Ne ostavljaj me samu" | 3:24 | | 3. | "Oči plave boje" | 3:28 | | 4. | "K'o da sutra ne postoji" | 3:52 | | 5. | "Jedna više" | 4:06 | | 6. | "Idi lepi moj" | 3:38 | | 7. | "Balkan" | 4:01 | | 8. | "Šta je bilo, bilo je" | 3:50 | | 9. | "Dan od života" | 3:22 | | 10. | "Dim srca mog" | 3:55 | | Total length: | | 37:22 |
Dođi i uzmi me	Released: 30 July 2005; Label: Grand Production; Formats: CD, cassette	—	150,000	Track listing: | No. | Title | Length | |---|---|---| | 1. | "Dođi i uzmi me" | 3:56 | | 2. | "Kad čujem korak tvoj" | 3:33 | | 3. | "Iskoristi moje mane" | 3:27 | | 4. | "Sviđa mi se tvoja devojka" | 4:28 | | 5. | "Moje prvo neverstvo" | 4:04 | | 6. | "Svi tvoji milioni" | 3:08 | | 7. | "Gde sam ti ja" | 4:19 | | 8. | "Za ljubav mobilna" | 3:51 | | 9. | "Početak kraja" | 3:52 | | 10. | "Otrovnica" | 3:47 | | Total length: | | 38:30 |
Kraljica	Released: 23 November 2007; Label: Grand Production; Formats: CD, digital download	—	250,000	Track listing: | No. | Title | Length | |---|---|---| | 1. | "Kraljica" | 3:52 | | 2. | "Aspirin" | 3:44 | | 3. | "Boli stara ljubav" | 3:19 | | 4. | "Poslednji let" | 4:59 | | 5. | "Nije ona ta" | 3:12 | | 6. | "Milostinja" | 3:41 | | 7. | "Hirošima" | 3:02 | | 8. | "Tesna koža" | 4:04 | | 9. | "Impulsi" | 2:51 | | 10. | "Sokole moj" | 3:43 | | 11. | "Reci gde smo mi" | 3:36 | | Total length: | | 40:07 |
Slučajni partneri	Released: 14 December 2009; Label: Grand Production; Formats: CD, digital download, streaming	—	200,000	Track listing: | No. | Title | Length | |---|---|---| | 1. | "Slučajni partneri" | 4:12 | | 2. | "Što je bilo moje, njeno je" | 3:36 | | 3. | "Nije za mene" | 4:02 | | 4. | "Ja tuđe usne ljubim" | 3:49 | | 5. | "Idi pre jutra" | 3:08 | | 6. | "Ako me voliš pusti me" | 3:44 | | 7. | "Idi sa njom" | 3:47 | | 8. | "Neka nova ljubav" | 3:25 | | 9. | "Dva srca na zidu" | 3:28 | | 10. | "Milo za drago" | 3:29 | | 11. | "Rođena s vukovima" | 4:38 | | 12. | "I u vatru, i u vodu" | 3:08 | | 13. | "Devet dana" | 3:54 | | 14. | "Ja nsiam nešto slatko" | 3:56 | | 15. | "Na kraju sveta" | 3:20 | | Total length: | | 55:44 |
Lom	Released: 2 May 2012; Label: Grand Production; Formats: CD, digital download, streaming	—	75,000	Track listing: | No. | Title | Length | |---|---|---| | 1. | "Lom, lom" | 3:32 | | 2. | "Ale ale" | 3:30 | | 3. | "Kažu svi" | 3:25 | | 4. | "Laka meta" | 3:42 | | 5. | "Jednom tvoja sreća nikada" | 3:44 | | 6. | "Briga me" | 3:31 | | 7. | "Kučka" | 4:16 | | 8. | "Rođena da budem druga" | 3:55 | | 9. | "Sudbino reci" | 3:38 | | 10. | "Molim te" | 4:07 | | Total length: | | 37:24 |
Lek za spavanje	Released: 26 May 2015; Label: City Records; Formats: CD, digital download, streaming	—	50,000	Track listing: | No. | Title | Length | |---|---|---| | 1. | "Crveni ruž" | 2:54 | | 2. | "Ranjeni lav" | 3:58 | | 3. | "Lek za spavanje" | 3:02 | | 4. | "Dobri druže moj" | 3:24 | | 5. | "Ti se hrani mojim bolom" | 3:26 | | 6. | "Brada od tri dana" | 3:57 | | 7. | "Nemoj sa njim" | 4:03 | | 8. | "Odiesja" | 4:13 | | 9. | "Ti se hrani mojim bolom" (feat. Sha) | 3:38 | | Total length: | | 32:39 |
Koma	Released: 10 April 2017; Label: City Records; Formats: CD, digital download, streaming	—	50,000	Track listing: | No. | Title | Length | |---|---|---| | 1. | "Koma" | 3:32 | | 2. | "Doktore" | 3:30 | | 3. | "Evo" | 3:57 | | 4. | "Fine i poštene" | 4:12 | | 5. | "Poludela" | 3:05 | | 6. | "Haljina na pruge" | 3:01 | | 7. | "Ti i ja smo par" | 3:28 | | 8. | "Boca plina" | 3:09 | | 9. | "Flaster" | 3:16 | | Total length: | | 31:14 |
Bioskop	Released: 5 May 2022; Label: City Records; Formats: CD, digital download, streaming	—	10,000	Track listing: | No. | Title | Length | |---|---|---| | 1. | "Bioskop" | 2:58 | | 2. | "Paralela" | 3:14 | | 3. | "Poziv u pomoć" | 3:33 | | 4. | "Luda glava" | 3:57 | | 5. | "Rana" | 3:50 | | 6. | "Narkotik" | 4:13 | | 7. | "Dok si tu" | 2:55 | | Total length: | | 24:42 |
Femme fatale	Released: 7 October 2026; Label: Self-released; Formats: Digital download, streaming	69		Track listing: | No. | Title | Length | |---|---|---| | 1. | "Lisica" | 2:34 | | 2. | "Meni si neko" | 3:03 | | 3. | "Milano" | 3:04 | | 4. | "Paranoje" | 3:05 | | 5. | "Plamen" | 3:02 | | 6. | "Tahikardija" | 3:08 | | 7. | "Igre" (with Rasta) | 3:06 | | 8. | "Trag" (with Rasta) | 3:09 | | Total length: | | 24:11 |

=== Live albums ===
Title	Details
Seka in the House 1	Released: 17 February 2022; Label: Self-released; Formats: Digital download, streaming
Seka in the House 2	Released: 22 February 2022; Label: Self-released; Formats: Digital download, streaming
Seka in the House 3	Released: 22 February 2022; Label: Self-released; Formats: Digital download, streaming
In the House Live	Released: 8 October 2025; Label: Self-released; Formats: Digital download, streaming

=== Compilations ===
Title	Details
The Best of Seka Aleksić (20 hitova)	Released: 2011; Label: Grand Production; Formats: CD, digital download, streaming
The Best of Seka (40 hitova)	Released: 2015; Label: Grand Production; Formats: CD, digital download, streaming
19 vanvremenskih hitova	Released: 2018; Label: City Records; Formats: CD, digital download, streaming
Kolekcija singlova	Released: 26 February 2023; Label: Self-released; Formats: Digital download, streaming

== Extended plays ==
Title	Details	Notes
Trilogy	Released: 22 September 2024; Label: Self-released; Formats: Digital download, streaming	Track listing: | No. | Title | Length | |---|---|---| | 1. | "Johnnie" | 3:51 | | 2. | "Umri do zore" | 2:29 | | 3. | "Ti i ja" | 3:12 | | Total length: | | 9:32 |
Trilogy 2	Released: 24 December 2024; Label: Self-released; Formats: Digital download, streaming	Track listing: | No. | Title | Length | |---|---|---| | 1. | "Blago meni" | 2:29 | | 2. | "Šteta" | 2:30 | | 3. | "Eminentna dama" | 3:08 | | Total length: | | 8:07 |
Trilogy 3	Released: 31 December 2025; Label: Self-released; Formats: Digital download, streaming	Track listing: | No. | Title | Length | |---|---|---| | 1. | "Bate Bate" | 2:59 | | 2. | "Anatema" | 2:55 | | 3. | "Bumerang" | 2:36 | | Total length: | | 8:30 |

=== Compilation extended plays ===
Title
Seka singlovi
Details
- Released: 27 May 2015
- Label: Self-released
- Formats: Digital download, streaming
Notes
Track listing
- No.	Title	Length
  1.	"Chivas"	4:17
  2.	"Mamurna"	4:05
  3.	"Brodolom" (featuring Juice)	3:37
  Total length:		11:59

== Singles ==
Title	Year	Album
"Tamo gde si ti"	2010	Non-album single
"Soba 22"	2011	The Best of Seka Aleksić (20 hitova) and The Best of Seka (40 hitova)
"Šampione"	2013	The Best of Seka (40 hitova)
"U mraku"	2013	The Best of Seka (40 hitova)
"Mamurna"	2014	The Best of Seka (40 hitova) and Kolekcija singlova
"Brodolom" (featuring Juice)	2014	The Best of Seka (40 hitova) and Kolekcija singlova
"Chivas"	2014	The Best of Seka (40 hitova) and Kolekcija singlova
"Crnooka"	2016	19 vanvremenskih hitova
"Folirant"	2018	Kolekcija singlova
"Oslobodi me"	2018	Kolekcija singlova
"Bolja sam od zdravlja"	2018	Kolekcija singlova
"Zakuni se u kurvu"	2019	Kolekcija singlova
"Ništa me više ne boli"	2019	Kolekcija singlova
"Sahara"	2019	Kolekcija singlova
"Adio"	2020	Kolekcija singlova
"Dok si tu"	2021	Bioskop and Kolekcija singlova
"Lomiš me"	2021	Kolekcija singlova
"Priđi ako smeš"	2022	Non-album singles
"Voli me, ne voli"	2022	Non-album singles
"Emotivno nedostupan"	2023	Non-album singles
"Kao da si prvi"	2026	Non-album singles
"Samo bivša"	2026	Non-album singles

== Other charted songs ==
Title	Year	Peak chart positions	Album
Title	Year	CRO Billb.	Album
"Trag" (with Rasta)	2026	11	Femme fatale
"Igre" (with Rasta)	2026	14	Femme fatale

== Music videos ==
Title	Year	Director(s)
"Crno i zlatno"	2003	Dejan Milićević
"Sviđa mi se tvoja devojka"	2005	Mosquito Adventures Pictures
"Aspirin"	2007	Hammer Production
"Boli stara ljubav"	2007	Unknown
"Poslednji let"	2009	Unknown
"Slučajni partneri"	2009	Unknown
"Što je bilo moje, njeno je"	2010	Unknown
"Tamo gde si ti"	2010	Unknown
"Soba 22"	2011	Top Music Video Production
"Ale, ale"	2012	Passion Company
"Šampione"	2013	Unknown
"Mamurna"	2014	Andrej Ilić
"Brodolom"	2014	Andrej Ilić
"Chivas"	2014	Unknown
"Crveni ruž"	2015	Nikola Matijević
"Lek za spavanje"	2015	Nikola Matijević
"Ti se hrani mojim bolom" (Remix)	2015	Nikola Matijević
"Crnooka"	2016	Nemanja Novaković
"Evo"	2017	Nikola Matijević
"Koma"	2017	Nikola Matijević
"Doktore"	2017	Nikola Matijević
"Fine i poštene"	2017	Nikola Matijević
"Poludela"	2017	Nikola Matijević
"Ti i ja smo par"	2017	Nemanja Novaković
"Folirant"	2018	Nemanja Novaković
"Oslobodi me"	2018	Nemanja Novaković
"Bolja sam od zdravlja"	2018	Nemanja Novaković
"Zakuni se u kurvu"	2019	Nemanja Novaković
"Ništa me više ne boli"	2019	Nemanja Novaković
"Sahara"	2019	Nikola Matijević
"Dok si tu"	2021	Andreja Damnjanović
"Lomiš me"	2021	Andreja Damnjanović
"Bioskop"	2022	Nemanja Novaković
"Rana"	2022	Stanislav Zakić, Vuk Protić
"Luda glava"	2022	Stanislav Zakić
"Priđi ako smeš"	2022	Stanislav Zakić
"Voli me, ne voli"	2022	Stanislav Zakić
"Emotivno nedostupan"	2023	Stanislav Zakić
