= Slobodan Ninković =

Serbian actor

- Слободан Нинковић
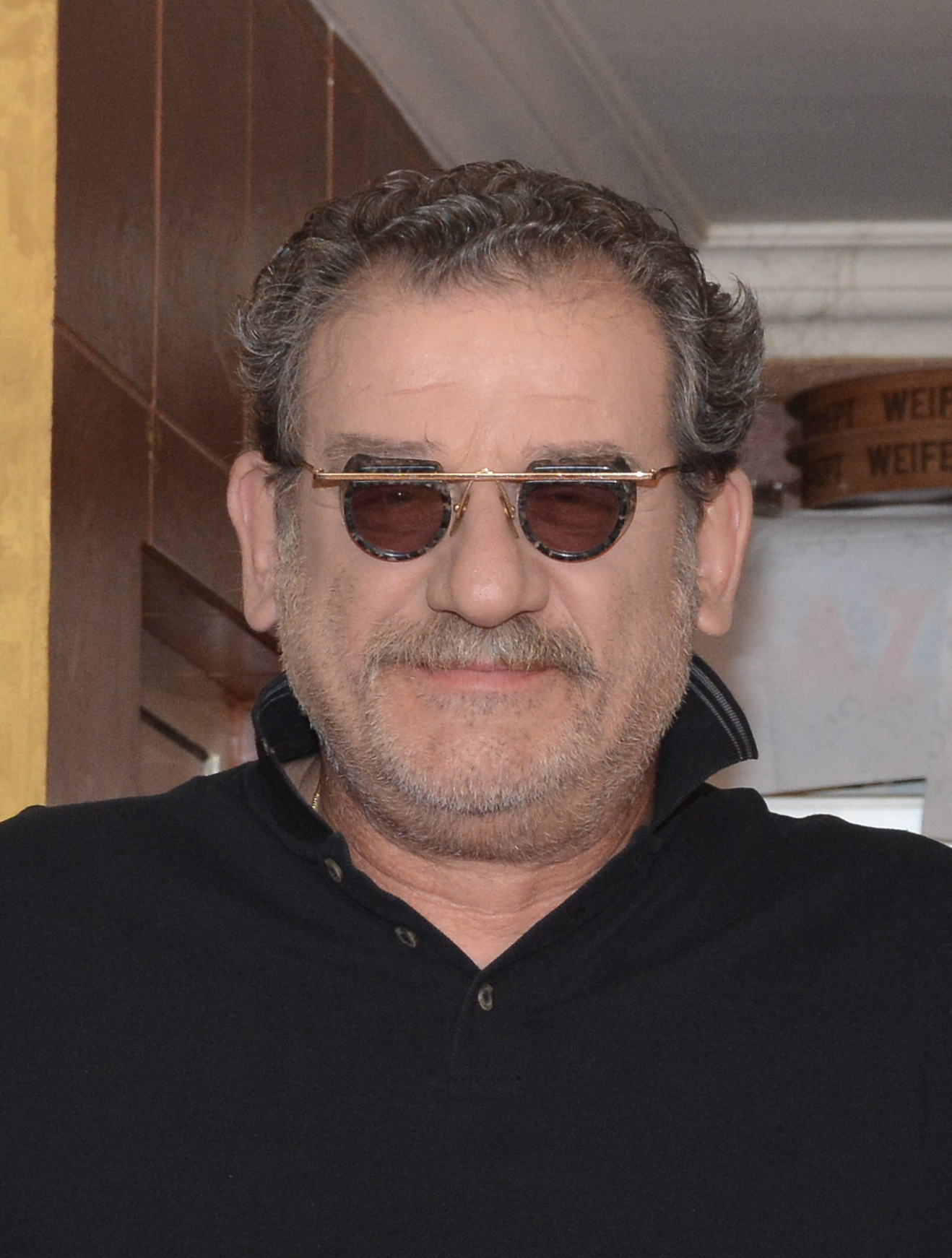
- Ninković in February 2008
- Born: 25 November 1956 (age 69); Smederevo, PR Serbia, FPR Yugoslavia
- Other name: Boda
- Education: Faculty of Dramatic Arts
- Alma mater: University of Arts in Belgrade
- Occupation: Actor

Slobodan "Boda" Ninković (Serbian Cyrillic: Слободан "Бода" Нинковић; born 25 November 1956 in Smederevo) is a Serbian actor. He is known for his work in the films Ulysses' Gaze, The Crusaders and We Are Not Angels. He starred in the popular television series Otvorena vrata, Naša mala klinika and Senke nad Balkanom.

Considered a dedicated and hard-working method actor, Ninković is also known for his work ethic and prolific stance in theatre. He has performed in the National Theatre in Belgrade, Atelje 212, the Boško Buha Theatre, the Zvezdara Theatre and the Yugoslav Drama Theatre. In his theatre repertoire, he has appeared over three thousand times on stage, including performing in two different theatres two different plays at the same time (Ona voli Mambo in the Bitef Theatre and Grobljanska in the Zvezdara Theatre). He is widely called "a legend of Smederevo" by critics, actors, historians, writers and academics.

== Career ==
An alumnus of the Faculty of Dramatic Arts in Belgrade, he was a member of what was nicknamed "the turbo-class". The twelve-student class of 1984, led by Vladimir Jevtović, has spawned well established actors in Serbian theatre, television and film, including Dragan Bjelogrlić, Vesna Trivalić, Srđan Todorović, Mirjana Joković, Milorad Mandić, Vesna Stanojević, Dušanka Stojanović, Dragan Petrović, Branka Pujić, Darko Tomović, Tatjana Venčelovski and Ninković, respectively.

Best known for his versatile and wide range in theatre, he is prominent for both his comedic and dramatic roles in the National Theatre in Belgrade, Atelje 212, the Boško Buha Theatre, the Zvezdara Theatre and the Yugoslav Drama Theatre, including modern repertoire and classic works by Racine, Shakespeare, Dostoyevski, Tolstoy, A. P. Chekhov, Faulkner, Homer and Molière.

He has appeared in over fifty films, starring in over twenty of them. Among his notable credits stand Ulysses' Gaze, The Crusaders, We Are Not Angels, Sveti Georgije ubiva aždahu and San zimske noći. He has starred in the commercially and critically successful cult classic televised series as Otvorena vrata, Naša mala klinika and Senke nad Balkanom. He appeared in supporting roles in the series Bolji život and Folk. He was also the presenter of Beovizija 2007.

He has also worked prominently in radio and animation. He is the official Serbian voice dub for Goofy. He also voiced Tantor in the Serbian dub of Tarzan, Philoctetes in the Serbian dub of Hercules, Li Shan in the Serbian dub of Kung Fu Panda 3 and Smokey in Cars 3.

His autobiography Slušaj sine ove velike reči, written by Jovica Tišma, was released in February 2019. His book Sin moj is set to be released 2021.

== Filmography ==
Year	Title	Role
1987.	Vidim ti lađu na kraju puta	Lađar Vasa
1987.	Pogrešna procena	
1987–1988.	Vuk Karadžić	sveštenik
1988.	Braća po materi	Antiša
1989.	Sveti Georgije ubiva aždahu	Reci Vojo
1989.	Vreme čuda (serija)	Ozren
1989.	Vreme čuda	Ozren
1989.	Švedski aranžman	
1989.	Dome, slatki dome	Kiza
1989.	Kako je propao rokenrol	milicajac
1989.	Drugarica ministarka	
1989.	Balkan ekspres 2	
1990.	Agencija Kikom	Kiza
1990.	Hajde da se volimo 3	
1991.	Bolji život 2	putnik u vozu
1991.	Holivud ili propast	
1991.	Tesna koža 4	Rambo
1992.	Vukov Video Bukvar (TV serija)	
1992.	Policajac sa Petlovog brda	Vučina
1992.	Mi nismo anđeli	Cane
1992–1993.	Volim i ja nerandže... no trpim (serija)	Joviša
1992.	Dama koja ubija	
1992.	Sekula nevino optužen	Sekula
1993.	Pun mesec nad Beogradom	Milorad
1993.	Obračun u Kazino Kabareu	Rile
1993.	Policajac sa Petlovog brda (TV serija iz 1993)	Vučina
1994.	Goli život	Vojvoda
1994.	Dva sata kvalitetnog programa	Bambusić
1994.	Biće bolje	Dikan
1993–1994.	Srećni ljudi	Stojiljko Stojiljković 'Rambo'
1995.	Nasleđe	Tika
1995.	Udri jače manijače	
1995.	Otvorena vrata	Šuvaković
1995.	Snovi od šperploče	Bajlag
1995.	Odisejev pogled	
1997.	Laža i paralaža	Paralaža - Mita
1997.	Tri letnja dana	Mali
1998.	Crveno, žuto, zeleno... kreni	
1998.	Kod lude ptice	glumac
1998.	Još tvoje ruže mirišu samoćom (TV)	govori stihove
1999.	Kod male sirene	
1999.	Belo odelo	kondukter
2000.	Zemlja istine, ljubavi i slobode	
2001.	Crociati	Olaf Gunarson
2001.	Normalni ljudi	Bane
2001.	Bar—Beograd vija Peking	Blagota
2001.	Blizanci	
2002.	Fazoni i Fore 2	
2002.	Mrtav 'ladan	Mića 'Šaft'
2002.	Mala noćna muzika	Šule
2002.	Kazneni prostor (TV serija)	
2003.	Kazneni prostor 2	
2003.	Život je marš	
2003.	Siroti mali hrčki 2010	šef šifranata
2003.	Ledina	Paja
2004.	Poljupci	
2004.	Pad u raj	siledžija
2004.	Jesen stiže, Dunjo moja	Timotije
2004.	San zimske noći	Cvikeraš
2005.	Na Badnji dan	Svetozar Vujić
2005.	Mi nismo anđeli 2	Cane Pilot
2005.	Dangube!	
2005.	Libero	otac
2005.	Potera za sreć(k)om	Sale
2005.	Made in YU	Petar
2005.	Lele, bato	Docent Rakočević
2006.	Ljubav, navika, panika	Gile
2006.	Drugo stanje	Slobodan Boda Dimić
2006.	Rekonvalescenti	potpukovnik
2006–2007.	Agencija za SIS	Rista
2007.	Pozorište u kući (2007)	kolega Brkić
2007–2008.	Kafanica blizu SIS-a	Rista
2007–2008.	Naša mala klinika (Srbija)	Dr. Vrabac
2008.	April i detektivi (TV film)	Klovn
2009.	Drug Crni u NOB-u	Drug Uča / Fon Šturmkugl
2009.	Sveti Georgije ubiva aždahu	Ninko Belotić
2009–2010.	Selo gori, a baba se češlja (TV serija)	Dragutin
2010.	Ma nije on takav	komšija
2010.	Montevideo, Bog te video!	Đorđe
2012.	Montevideo, Bog te video! (TV serija)	Đorđe
2013.	Na putu za Montevideo	Đorđe
2013.	Skidanje	Monti
2013	Vilenjakova priča	Kengi
2013	O bubicama i herojima	Crki
2013	Ravna Gora (TV serija)	Nikodije Janjić Kode
2014	Svinjari	Koda
2015	Za kralja i otadžbinu	Nikodije Janjić Kode
2016	Cipiripi	Čokica
2017-2019	Senke nad Balkanom	žandar Živojin
2018-2019	Žigosani u reketu	Živko
2019	Izgubljeni snovi	Old man Adi
2019	Glorija	Jere
