= We Are Not Angels 3: Rock & Roll Strike Back =

We Are Not Angels 3: Rock & Roll Strikes Back
- Ми нисмо анђели: Рокенрол узвраћа ударац Mi nismo anđeli 3: Rokenrol uzvraća udarac
- Directed by: Petar Pašić
- Written by: Srđan Dragojević; Petar Pašić; Dimitrije Vojnov
- Produced by: Srđan Dragojević; Snežana Penev; Biljana Prvanović
- Starring: Nikola Pejaković; Srđan Todorović; Uroš Đurić; Zlatko Rakonjac; Nada Macanković; Zoran Cvijanović; Vesna Trivalić; Seka Aleksić
- Cinematography: Vladan Janković; Dušan Joksimović
- Edited by: Marko Glušac
- Music by: Igor Perović
- Release date: 2006
- Running time: 86 min
- Language: Serbian

A3: Rokenrol uzvraća udarac is a 2006 Serbian film.

== Plot ==
At a 1973 Youth Work Action somewhere in SFR Yugoslavia, budding musician Borko Pavić (Nikola Pejaković) is greatly disappointed upon discovering that the majority of his fellow youth workers prefer to dance kolo to folkish accordion sounds rather than listening to him play his acoustic guitar. Heartbroken and depressed, he confides to his best friend about once reading that young people in America make the devil appear by playing their music backward and that the devil then makes them rich and famous. He decides to test the theory and suddenly the devil and angel from the previous Mi nismo anđeli movies materialize and grant him his wishes of women, fame, and fortune. Young Borko thus becomes the mega-popular Yugoslavia-wide rock'n'roll superstar Dorijan.

Over 30 years later, Dorijan is still an unstable superstar, except that he has now switched to playing turbo folk instead of rock'n'roll. He lives with a trophy girlfriend, Smokvica, while his business manager is his childhood best friend. Despite still having his women, fame, and fortune, Dorijan feels creatively boxed in and unhappy about having to perform a musical style he detests in order to maintain his affluence.

== See also ==
- We Are Not Angels
