= We Are Not Angels =

1992 film by Srđan Dragojević

- DVD cover
- Ми нисмо анђели Mi nismo anđeli
- Directed by: Srđan Dragojević
- Written by: Srđan Dragojević and Isidora Bjelica
- Produced by: Gojko Kastratović; Ranko Petrič
- Starring: Nikola Kojo; Uroš Đurić; Srđan Todorović; Milena Pavlović; Zoran Cvijanović; Branka Katić; Vesna Trivalić; Sonja Savic
- Cinematography: Dušan Joksimović
- Edited by: Branka Čeperac
- Music by: Aleksandar Eraković
- Release date: 1992
- Running time: 103 min
- Country: FR Yugoslavia
- Language: Serbian

We Are Not Angels (Serbian: Mi nismo anđeli, Ми нисмо анђели) is a 1992 Serbian comedy film directed by Srđan Dragojević that became one of the most popular films of the 1990s in the region of the former Yugoslavia. The plot revolves around an Angel (played by Uroš Đurić) and a Devil (Srđan Todorović) fighting for the soul of a Belgrade playboy Nikola (Nikola Kojo) who is unaware that he impregnated a high school student named Marina (Milena Pavlović) during a drunken one-night stand.

== Plot ==
An Angel and Devil observe the residents of Belgrade, trying to influence their actions and betting over them. Among them is a 20-year-old playboy, Nikola, a literature student who has already slept with almost half of the girls in the city. On one occasion, he gets so drunk that he forgets he spent the night with an otherwise very unremarkable and unattractive girl, Marina. Unbeknownst to him, she became pregnant. Since Marina does not want to have an abortion, her friend Buba tries various tricks to make Nikola fall in love with Marina. When he finally learns about the pregnancy, he tries to persuade Marina to have an abortion, but she refuses. In the end, Marina gives birth to a baby girl, Sofija, and Nikola has to take responsibility and be with her, and realises, to his shock, that his daughter may one day become a 'victim' of seducers like him. Satisfied with the outcome, the Angel concludes that he won the bet.

== Cast ==
- Nikola Kojo as Nikola
- Milena Pavlović as Marina
- Srđan Todorović as the Devil
- Uroš Đurić as the Angel
- Branka Katić as Buba
- Sonja Savić as Marta
- Zoran Cvijanović as Đura
- Bata Kameni as Brle
- Miki Manojlović as Milan
- Bojan Žirović as Raca
- Bogdan Diklić as Pavle
- Stanislava Pešić as Olga
- Eva Ras as Baba Sera
- Vesna Trivalić as Violeta
- Slobodan Ninković as Cane
- Vojka Đordić as Višnja
- Dragan Maksimović as hippie
- Branko Vidaković as Šilja
- Nataša Lučanin as Julijana Vladić
- Ratko Tankosić as Smrda ("smelly")
- Tatjana Pujin as Lidija
- Goran Daničić as Radoš "Johnny"
- Dejan Matić as policeman

== Characters ==
- Nikola Milojević (Nikola Kojo), a Belgrade playboy who has slept with almost every girl in town. He is a 20-year-old literature student, and lives with his friend Marta. He has one problem: due to his regular morning hangovers he can never remember the girl he slept with the night before. Marina's pregnancy makes Nikola insecure and frightened, but he finally falls in love with Marina. They get a baby girl, named Sofija.
- Marina (Milena Pavlović), an 18-year-old honor student. Nikola is the first guy she's slept with, but she gets pregnant. She decides to keep the baby, and falls in love with Nikola, wanting him all for herself. Her friend Buba has many plans of how to do it, and Marina's not always all right with her plans but still carries through with them. At the end of the movie, Marina gives a birth to a beautiful baby girl, Sofija.
- Ljubinka "Buba" Prodanović (Branka Katić), Marina's best friend, an 18-year-old pupil of the High School of Beauty Care. She is the world's biggest fan of Barbara Sidney (a fictional author), and also the author of the book The most famous playboys of Belgrade. Buba tries to get Marina and Nikola together, basing her plans on Barbara Sidney's novels. She is helped by Raca, who she constantly spurns until the end of the movie.
- Devil (Srđan Todorović) and Angel (Uroš Đurić), the two spirits overlooking Nikola, playing a game - if Nikola falls in love with Marina and takes care of their baby, Angel wins, while if he refuses to take responsibility, Devil wins.

== Production ==
The movie was shot during fall 1991 using the production capabilities of Avala Film. The making of the movie coincided with the beginning stages of the disintegration of Yugoslavia that included continual ethnically motivated incidents in the breakaway constituent republic of SR Croatia that culminated in the Battle of Vukovar. Since the Yugoslav People's Army (JNA) was involved in the conflict, it was conscripting young men for battle thus many of the film's male crew members, including director Dragojević, received military call-ups. According to Dragojević, in order to avoid the draft, they resorted to sleeping in different apartments most nights during the movie's shooting.

Dragan Bjelogrlić was supposed to portray the Angel, but he refused the role and it was given to artist Uroš Đurić.

== Release and reception ==
The film was lauded by critics for its inventive direction, tight editing, urban humour and its large number of pop culture references. Its commercial success and later cult status, however, could be at least partially attributed to specific circumstances at the time of the film's premiere. Namely, before the film reached theatres, the Federal Republic of Yugoslavia was put under UN sanctions, thus depriving local theatres of Hollywood blockbusters. Many local films, including We Are Not Angels, filled that void and had great commercial success. In 1996, the members of the Yugoslav Board of the Academy of Film Art and Science (AFUN) voted this film the ninth best Serbian movie in the 1947–1995 period.

== Legacy ==
The Yugoslav Film Archive, in accordance with its authorities based on the Law on Cultural Heritage, declared one hundred Serbian feature films (1911–1999) as cultural heritage of great importance on December 28, 2016. We Are Not Angels is also on that list.

== Sequels ==
- We Are Not Angels 2 (2005), featuring a break-through role of Mirka Vasiljević who became a teen idol.
- We Are Not Angels 3: Rockenroll Strikes Back (2006)
