= Herd (2016 film) =

- Directed by: Nikola Kojo
- Starring: Nikola Kojo; Vesna Trivalić
- Release date: 23 November 2016
- Running time: 100 minutes
- Country: Serbia
- Language: Serbian

Herd (Serbian: Stado) is a 2016 Serbian comedy film directed by Nikola Kojo.

== Cast ==
- Nikola Kojo - Kolja
- Vesna Trivalić - Vida
- Zoran Cvijanović - Cveja
- Nataša Ninković - Mila
- Nikola Đuričko - Baki
- Srđan Timarov - Trajko
- Goran Šušljik - Goša
- Branislav Trifunović - Lawyer actor
- Lako Nikolić - Laki
- Nikola Vujović - Bailiff actor
- Goran Radaković - Milan
- Petar Strugar - Sava
- Nebojša Ilić - Bailiff
- Vojin Ćetković - Neša
