= Mirka Vasiljević =

Serbian actress

- Мирка Васиљевић
- Born: 27 September 1990 (age 34); Belgrade, SR Serbia, Yugoslavia
- Occupation(s): Actress, model, television presenter
- Years active: 2003–present
- Partner: Vujadin Savić (2009–present)
- Children: 4

Mirka Vasiljević (Serbian Cyrillic: Мирка Васиљевић; born 27 September 1990) is a Serbian actress and occasional model and television presenter. She rose to domestic fame with the 2005 film We Are Not Angels 2, the sequel to the 1992 cult film We Are Not Angels. Vasiljević has since established a career as one of the most eminent young actors in Serbia. In 2005, she earned a Rose d'Or Award for Best Television Actress nomination for her work on Love, Habit, Panic.

== Personal life ==
Since 2009, Vasiljević has dated footballer Vujadin Savić, the son of Serbian footballer Dušan Savić. In 2011 the couple were expecting a baby, later confirmed to be a boy. After that they got one more son and daughter. Vujadin announced they would get married, probably in 2018.

Vasiljević took intensive ballet lessons to prepare herself for the role in television series TNW: Totally New Wave.

== Filmography ==
Title	Year	Format	Role	Notes
City Kids	2003	TV show	Herself	(2003–06) Presenter
We Are Not Angels 2	2005	Film	Sofija Milojević	Mi nismo anđeli 2
Love, Habit, Panic	2005	TV series	Janja	(2005–07) Ljubav, navika, panika Nominated – Rose d'Or Award for Best Television Actress
Don't Turn from the Path	2006	TV special	A Girl from the Video	Ne skreći sa staze
Transforma	2006	TV series	Herself	(1 episode)
The Age of Virginity	2007	Short Film	Sara	Doba nevinosti
Love, Habit, Panic	2007	Stage	Janja	Ljubav, navika, panika
The Prime Minister	2008	TV series	Iva	Premijer
Aladin's Magical Lamp	2008	Stage	Jasmin	Aladinova čarobna lampa
Money or Life	2009	TV series	Kosa	Pare ili život
TNW: Totally New Wave	2010	TV series	Milica	(2010–11) TNT: Totalno novi talas
The Scent of Rain in the Balkans	2010	TV series	Blanki Salom	(2010–11) Miris kiše na Balkanu
Zduhač Means Adventure	2011	Film	Milica	Zduhač znači avantura

== Awards and nominations ==
Award	Year	Category	Work	Result
Rose d'Or	2005	Best Television Actress	Love, Habit, Panic	Nominated
