= Life Is a Miracle =

- The Life Is a Miracle movie poster
- Живот је чудо Život je čudo
- Directed by: Emir Kusturica
- Written by: Ranko Božić; Emir Kusturica
- Produced by: Alain Sarde; Emir & Maja Kusturica
- Starring: Slavko Štimac; Nataša Šolak; Vesna Trivalić; Vuk Kostić
- Cinematography: Michel Amathieu
- Edited by: Svetolik Zajc
- Music by: Dejo Sparavalo; Emir Kusturica
- Distributed by: Mars Distribution
- Release date: May 14, 2004
- Running time: 155 minutes
- Countries: Serbia and Montenegro; France
- Language: Serbian
- Budget: US$8,000,000
- Box office: $634,896 (Italy) $345,862 (Russia & CIS) $325,076 (Spain) $197,080 (Poland) $3,384,721 (France)

Life Is a Miracle (Serbian: Život je čudo / Живот је чудо) is a Serbian drama film directed by Emir Kusturica in 2004. It was entered into the 2004 Cannes Film Festival, where the lead animal actor, Acrobatic Dog, won the Palm Dog award. It received nomination at the Golden Eagle Award in 2005 for Best Foreign Language Film.

== Plot ==
The film opens just as construction has been completed on a railway connecting mountainous regions of eastern Bosnia and western Serbia in 1992. Luka, a Serbian engineer, has moved to Bosnia from Belgrade with his mentally unstable wife, Jadranka, and his football-playing son, Miloš, to run a railway station and act as caretaker. Luka is at work preparing the opening of the railway while Miloš attempts to become a professional footballer with the Partizan team. Utterly engrossed in his work and blinded by natural optimism, Luka remains deaf to the increasingly persistent rumblings of war, which has broken out in Croatia and threatens to spread.

When the conflict explodes, Miloš is denied his place on the football field when he is enlisted into the Serbian army, and Jadranka disappears on the arm of a Hungarian musician. Eventually, Luka receives news that Miloš has been taken prisoner of war. Luka considers suicide, but a profiteering acquaintance presents him with Sabaha, a Bosnian Muslim whom he has taken hostage.

Luka intends to exchange Sabaha for Miloš, but the two fall in love after they are forced to flee deeper into Serb-controlled territory. When a UN-enforced prisoner exchange is finally arranged, Luka and Sabaha try to escape to Serbia at an attempt to cross the Drina river, but Sabaha is wounded by a Bosnian sniper after squatting to urinate behind a tree. Army nurses narrowly manage to save Sabaha's life, and she is exchanged for Miloš, along with other prisoners. Jadranka also returns, and the family is reunited in their old home, but Luka is lovesick. He lies down in front of a train, but when the train stops to avoid running over a mule, it is revealed that Sabaha is on board, and the two ride away on the mule.

== Cast ==
- Slavko Štimac – Luka
- Nataša Šolak – Sabaha
- Vesna Trivalić – Jadranka
- Vuk Kostić – Miloš
- Aleksandar Berček – Veljo
- Stribor Kusturica – Captain Aleksić
- Nikola Kojo – Filipović
- Mirjana Karanović – Nada
- Branislav Lalević – President
- Obrad Djurović – Vujan

== See also ==
- List of most expensive Serbian films
- Drvengrad
