= Nikola Kojo =

Serbian actor

- Born: Nikola Kojo; 5 September 1967 (age 59); Belgrade, SR Serbia, SFR Yugoslavia
- Other names: Nidža, Koja
- Occupations: Actor, Host
- Years active: 1980 – present
- Spouse: Aleksandra Đurić (m. 2007)

Nikola Kojo (Serbian Cyrillic: Никола Којо; born 5 September 1967) is a Serbian actor and film director as well the TV Host of the game shows The Weakest Link.

== Biography ==
Nikola was named after his great-grandfather, who was an protoiereus in Mostar. He made his acting debut before he turned 13, with the role of the boy Ivan in the 1980 film "Rad na određeno vreme". During the 1980s, he played notable roles in the film "Igmanski marš" (1983), the TV series Sivi Dom (1986), and one of the main roles in three sequels of the very popular film series Foolish Years, which profiled him as one of the most famous actors of the younger generation in the former Yugoslavia.

In 1992, he played the main role in Srđan Dragojević's film Mi nismo anđeli (We're Not Angels), for which he remains notable. He starred again in the 2005 sequel Mi nismo anđeli 2.

He is married to Aleksandra Đurić, with whom he has a daughter Ana (2008) and two twin daughters (2013).

He made his directing debut in the film Herd (2016).

During the 2022 Serbian general election Kojo supported opposition candidates Zdravko Ponoš, Marinika Tepić and Dobrica Veselinović.

== Selected filmography ==
=== Film ===
Year	Title	Role	Notes
1984	Šta se zgodi kad se ljubav rodi (1987)	Miša	
1991	A Tight Spot 4	Momir (Senior Detective in Training)	
1992	We Are Not Angels	Nikola	
1996	Lepa sela lepo gore	Velja	
1999	The Dagger	Milan Vilenjak	
2000	Sky Hook	Zuba	
2004	Life Is a Miracle	Filipović	
2011	The Parade	Limun	
2016	Herd	Kolja	

=== Television ===
Year	Title	Role	Notes	
1993	Policajac sa Petlovog Brda	Riđi	TV series; 6 episodes	
1994	Policajac sa Petlovog Brda 2	Riđi	TV series; 2 episodes	
1996-1997	Gore dole	Zarko Damjanovic	TV series; 13 episodes	
2003	Crni Gruja	Crni Djordje	TV series; 8 episodes	
2013-2014	Kriza	Aleš Firdus	TV series; 24 episodes	2023–present
2021-2024	Radio Mileva	Dača	TV series; 60 episodes	
2023–present	Najslabija karika	Host	TV series; 40 episodes	
