= Seka Aleksić =

Serbian singer (born 1981)

Seka Aleksić Сека Алексић
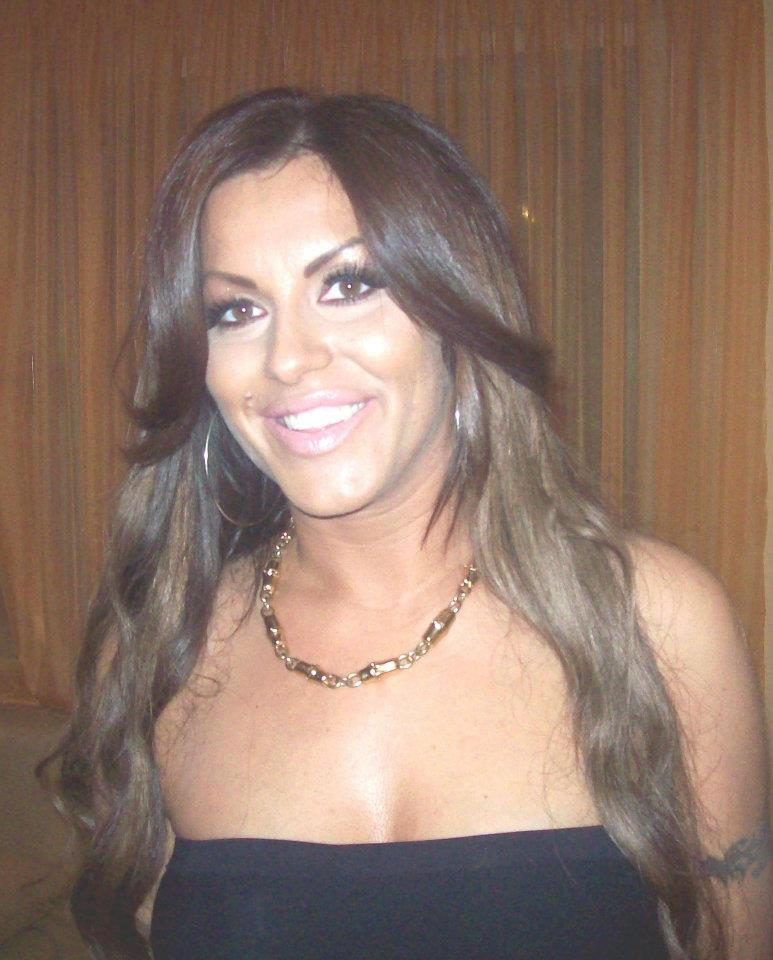
- Aleksić in 2012

Background information
- Also known as: Svetlana Piljikić
- Born: Svetlana Aleksić; 23 April 1981 (age 45); Zvornik, SR Bosnia and Herzegovina, SFR Yugoslavia
- Genres: Pop-folk; turbo-folk; pop
- Occupations: Singer; TV personality; actress; designer
- Instrument: Vocal
- Years active: 2002–present
- Labels: Grand; City Records
- Spouses: Dušan Vasilić (m. 2000; div. 2001) Veljko Piljikić (m. 2010)

Svetlana Piljikić (née Aleksić; Serbian Cyrillic: Светлана Пиљикић, née Алексић; born 23 April 1981), better known professionally as Seka Aleksić (Serbian Cyrillic: Сека Алексић), is a Serbian singer. She rose to prominence with her debut album Idealno tvoja (2002). Aleksić has collectively released nine studio albums of predominantly pop-folk music.

In addition to music, she starred in the movie We Are Not Angels 3: Rock & Roll Strike Back (2006) and her own reality television show Moja desna ruka (2010). Aleksić has also launched several clothing lines. She is currently the most followed woman from Serbia on Instagram with over two million followers.

== Early life ==
Svetlana Aleksić was born on 23 April 1981 in Zvornik, SFR Yugoslavia to a Bosnian Serb father Milorad Aleksić (1947–2017) and Bosniak mother Ibrima Ramić. Her parents divorced when she was seven years old. She stated that during her childhood, she witnessed her father being violent towards her mother.

During the Bosnian War, Aleksić fled to Serbia with her mother and older brother Nedžad Ramić. They had initially lived in Banja Koviljača before eventually settling down in the village of Lipolist near Šabac a year later.

== Career ==
Due to her family's financial struggles, Aleksić became a working singer early in her life. At the age of 19, she moved to Switzerland where she started performing with a band. Seka rose to prominence in 2002 by winning at the folk music festival Moravski biseri in Ćuprija with the song "Idealno tvoja". It was followed with the release of her debut album of the same name under Grand Production. Her subsequent albums Balkan (2003) and Dođi i uzmi me (2005) spawned regional hits such as "Crno i zlatno", "Sviđa mi se tvoja devojka" and "Svi tvoji milioni". Aleksić made her on-screen debut starring in the 2006 comedy film We Are Not Angels 3: Rock & Roll Strike Back, directed by Petar Pašić. Her third album Kraljica was released in November 2007. Selling in 300,000 copies, it became that year's best-selling album by a Serbian artist. Kraljica produced popular songs like "Aspirin" and "Poslednji let".

While promoting her fifth release, titled Slučajni partneri (2009), Aleksić announced her first solo concert in the Belgrade Arena. It was held on 24 October 2010 to 15,000 people. In 2010, she also appeared on her own reality competition show, called Moja desna ruka, which aired on TV Prva documenting the search for her new personal assistant, similarly to Donald Trump's The Apprentice (2004–2017) and Paris Hilton's My New BFF (2008–2009). Following the release of Lom in April 2012, she embarked on a tour across Europe and the United States. Aleksić provided the voiceover for the character Vexy in the Serbian adaptation of The Smurfs 2 (2013). She posed for the cover of the May 2014 issue of the Serbian Playboy magazine. In May 2015, Aleksić released Lek za spavanje through City Records, featuring hits such as the title song, "Crveni ruž" and "Ti se hrani mojim bolom". Her eighth album "Koma" was subsequently released in April 2017. It included hit songs like "Evo" and "Ti i ja smo par". Koma was followed with her second concert in the Belgrade Arena on 14 April 2018.

In May 2022, Aleksić released album Bioskop. She announced her tenth studio album, titled Disco Seka, with its lead single "Priđi ako smeš" in December 2022. During the 2023 Folk Music Assembly, Aleksić was declared the National Music Artist of Serbia.

== Personal life ==
Aleksić married former kickboxer Veljko Piljikić on 12 September 2010. They have two sons, Jovan (born 24 September 2016) and Jakov (born 22 January 2020). Both were conceived through in vitro fertilisation. Aleksić and her family reside in Stara Pazova.

She practices Eastern Orthodox Christianity and is vocal about her faith.

== Philanthropy ==
In December 2011, she held a benefit concert in Zenica for a young man, named Kemal Kremić, who was diagnosed with leukemia. The event reportedly raised €40,000.

Following the 2014 Southeast Europe floods, Aleksić supplied shelters in Serbia with food and hygiene products.

In August 2022, Aleksić condemned religious rallies against EuroPride in Belgrade and has since been known for showing her public support for the LGBT community in Serbia. In March 2023, she also denounced the assault against an LGBT activist in Banja Luka and addressed the mayor Draško Stanivuković to solve the case.

She has continuously supported the 2023 protests under the title Serbia Against Violence, organized following the Belgrade school shooting.

== Discography ==
- Idealno tvoja (2002)
- Balkan (2003)
- Dođi i uzmi me (2005)
- Kraljica (2007)
- Slučajni partneri (2009)
- Lom (2012)
- Lek za spavanje (2015)
- Koma (2017)
- Bioskop (2022)
- Femme fatale (2026)

== Filmography ==
Filmography of Seka Aleksić
Year	Title	Genre	Role	Notes
2006	We Are Not Angels 3: Rock & Roll Strike Back	Film	Smokvica	
2006	Ljubav, navika, panika	Television	Vrela Nela	1 Episode
2010	Moja desna ruka	Television	Herself	
2013	The Smurfs 2	Film	Vexy	Serbian dub
2021–2023	Majke i snajke	Television	Herself (presenter)	
2023	"Štit" (Kampanja protiv nasilja nad ženama)	Music video	Herself (cameo)	Ida Prester song
2025–2026	IDJ Show	Television	Herself (judge)	Seasons 4–5

== See also ==
- Music of Serbia
- Turbo-folk
