= Slučajni partneri =

Studio album by Seka Aleksić
- Released: 14 December 2009
- Recorded: 2008–09: Studio vs "XXL", Belgrade, Serbia čo; Vsi partneri Čap
- Genre: pop folk; pop
- Label: Grand Production

Seka Aleksić chronology
Kraljica (2007)	Slučajni partneri (2009)	Lom (2012)

Slučajni partneri (Accidental Partners) is the fifth studio album by Serbian pop-folk recording artist Seka Aleksić. It was released 14 December 2009 through the record label Grand Production.

== Track listing ==
No.	Title	Writer(s)	Length
1.	"Slučajni partneri (Accidental Partners)"	Dragan Brajović
2.	"Što je bilo moje, njeno je (What Was Once Mine, Is Hers)"	Dragan Brajović
3.	"Nija za mene (Not for Me)"	Dragan Brajović
4.	"Ja tuđe usne ljubim (I Kiss the Lips of Another)"	Dragan Brajović
5.	"Idi pre jutra (Leave Before the Morning)"	lyrics: Marina Tucaković, music: Aleksandar Perišić Romario
6.	"Ako me voliš pusti me (If You Love Me, Let Me Go)"	Dragiša Baša
7.	"Idi s njom (Leave with Her)"	Dragan Brajović
8.	"Neka nova ljubav (Some New Love)"	Dragiša Baša
9.	"Dva srca na zidu (Two Hearts on the Wall)"	lyrics: Marina Tucaković, music: Aleksandar Perišić Romario
10.	"Milo za drago (Tit for Tat)"	Dragan Brajović
11.	"Rođena s vukovima (Born with the Wolves)"	Dragiša Baša
12.	"I u vatru, i u vodu (Into Fire, Into Water)"	lyrics: Marina Tucaković, music: Aleksandar Perišić Romario
13.	"Devet dana (Nine Days)"	Dragan Brajović
14.	"Ja nisam nešto slatko (I'm Not Something Sweet)"	Dragiša Baša
15.	"Na kraju sveta (At the End of the World)"	Dragan Brajović
