= Dođi i uzmi me =

Studio album by Seka Aleksić
- Released: 30 July 2005
- Genre: pop folk
- Label: Grand Production
- Producer: Dejan Abadić

Seka Aleksić chronology
Balkan (2003)	Dođi i uzmi me (2005)	Kraljica (2007)

Dođi i uzmi me (Come and Get Me) is the third studio album by Serbian pop-folk recording artist Seka Aleksić. It was released 30 July 2005 through the record label Grand Production.

== Track listing ==
All tracks are arranged and produced by Dejan Abadić, except for "Moje prvo neverstvo" which was co-arranged with Staniša "Niše" Trajković.

No.	Title	Lyrics	Music	Length
1.	"Dođi i uzmi me"	Dragan "Braja" Brajović	Brajović	3:47
2.	"Kad čujem korak tvoj"	Brajović	Brajović	3:28
3.	"Iskoristi moje mane"	Marina Tucaković	Aleksandar "Romario" Perišić	3:22
4.	"Sviđa mi se tvoja devojka"	Brajović	Staniša "Niše" Trajković	4:20
5.	"Moje prvo neverstvo"	Brajović	Brajović	4:00
6.	"Svi tvoji milioni"	Brajović	Brajović	3:05
7.	"Gde sam ti ja"	Tucaković	Zoran "Kiki" Lesendrić	4:15
8.	"Za ljubav mobilna"	Strahinja Knežević	Perišić	3:48
9.	"Početak kraja"	Brajović	Brajović	3:47
10.	"Otrovnica"	Miloš "Žuća" Smiljanić	Vuk Ćeranić	3:45

Notes

- "Sviđa mi se tvoja devojka" contains samples from "Snakefood" (2001), written by Michael Parsberg, Morten Friis and Uffe Savery, and performed by Safri Duo.
