= Balkan (album) =

Studio album by Seka Aleksić
- Released: 1 December 2003
- Recorded: 1 September – 30 November 2003
- Genre: Pop folk
- Label: Grand Production
- Producer: Dejan Abadić

Seka Aleksić chronology
Idealno tvoja (2002)	Balkan (2003)	Dođi i uzmi me (2005)

Balkan is the second studio album by Bosnian-Serbian pop-folk recording artist Seka Aleksić. It was released 1 December 2003 through the record label Grand Production

== Track listing ==
1. Crno i zlatno (Black and Golden)
2. Ne ostavljaj me samu (Do Not Leave Me Alone)
3. Oči plave boje (Blue Eyes)
4. K'o da sutra ne postoji (As If Tomorrow Doesn't Exist)
5. Jedna više (One More)
6. Idi lepi moj (Go, My Lovely)
7. Balkan (The Balkans)
8. Šta je bilo, bilo je (What Happened, Happened)
9. Dan od života (A Day of Life)
10. Dim srca mog (Smoke of my Heart)
