= Zoran Cvijanović =

Serbian actor and producer

- Зоран Цвијановић
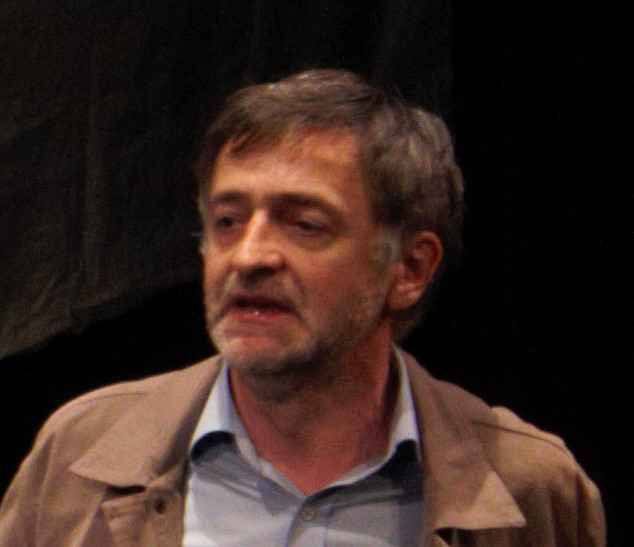
- Cvijanović performing in the staging of Prah at the Isabel Bader Theatre in Toronto in April 2016.
- Born: 25 January 1958 (age 68); Belgrade, PR Serbia, FPR Yugoslavia
- Occupations: Actor, producer
- Years active: 1975–present

Zoran "Cvija" Cvijanović (Serbian Cyrillic: Зоран "Цвија" Цвијановић; born 25 January 1958) is a Serbian actor and producer. He has starred in over 70 films and television series with his most notable role coming in the drama series Sivi dom (1984–1985). He also had a memorable performance in Pretty Village, Pretty Flame as Speedy.

== Selected filmography ==
=== Film ===
Year	Title	Role	Notes
1987	Oktoberfest (1987)	Bane	
1992	We Are Not Angels	Đura	
1996	Pretty Village, Pretty Flame	Speedy	
2001	Munje!	Santa Claus	
2004	When I Grow Up, I'll Be a Kangaroo	Police officer	
2005	We Are Not Angels 2	Đura	
2006	We Are Not Angels 3: Rock & Roll Strike Back	Momčilo	
2009	St. George Shoots the Dragon	Mile Vuković	
