= Idealno tvoja =

Studio album by Seka Aleksić
- Released: 5 May 2002
- Genre: pop folk
- Label: Grand Production

Seka Aleksić chronology
| Idealno tvoja (2002) | Balkan (2003) |

Idealno tvoja (Ideally Yours) is the debut studio album by Bosnian-Serbian pop-folk recording artist Seka Aleksić. It was released 5 May 2002 through the record label Grand Production.

== Track list ==
1. Opet (Again)
2. U kafani punoj dima (In a Kafana Full of Smoke)
3. Ne, nije (No, It's Not)
4. Ko ta čaša (Like That Glass)
5. Jer takva sam se rodila (Because I Was Born That Way)
6. Da sam muško (If I Were a Man)
7. Sve je laž (Everything Is a Lie)
8. Izdajice (Traitors)
9. Nemoj doći, ne (Do Not Come, No)
10. Idealno tvoja (Ideally Yours)
