= Kraljica =

Studio album by Seka Aleksić
- Released: 23 November 2007
- Recorded: 7 May – 23 November 2007
- Genre: Pop folk
- Label: Grand Production
- Producer: Dejan Abadić

Seka Aleksić chronology
| Dođi i uzmi me (2005) | Kraljica (2007) | Slučajni partneri (2009) |

Kraljica (The Queen) is the fourth studio album by Serbian pop-folk recording artist Seka Aleksić. It was released 23 November 2007 through the record label Grand Production.

== Track listing ==
1. Kraljica (Queen)
2. Aspirin
3. Boli stara ljubav (Old Love Hurts)
4. Poslednji let (Final Flight)
5. Nije ona ta (She's Not That One)
6. Milostinja (Charity)
7. Hirošima (Hiroshima)
8. Tesna koža (Tight Skin)
9. Impulsi (Impulses)
10. Sokole moj (My Falcon)
11. Reci gde smo mi (Say Where We Are)
