= Lom (album) =

Studio album by Seka Aleksić
- Released: 2 May 2012
- Recorded: Studio "XXL", Belgrade, Serbia
- Genre: pop folk; pop
- Label: Grand Production
- Producer: Dejan Abadić

Seka Aleksić chronology
Slučajni partneri (2009)	Lom (2012)	Lek za spavanje (2015)

Lom (Rumpus) is the sixth studio album by Bosnian-Serbian pop-folk recording artist Seka Aleksić. It was released 2 May 2012 through the record label Grand Production.

== Track listing ==
No.	Title	Writer(s)	Length
1.	"Lom, lom (Rumpus, Rumpus)"	Dragan Brajović	3:32
2.	"Ale, ale"	Dragan Brajović	3:30
3.	"Kažu svi (Everyone Says)"	Dragan Brajović	3:25
4.	"Laka meta (Easy Target)"	Dragan Brajović	3:42
5.	"Jednom tvoja srećna nikada (Once Yours, Never Happy)"	Dragan Brajović	3:44
6.	"Briga me (I Don't Care)"	lyrics: A. Božović, Goranče Dream Team, music: Goranče Dream Team	3:31
7.	"Kučka (Bitch)"	Dragiša Baša	4:16
8.	"Rođena da budem druga (Born to Be Second)"	lyrics: Marina Tucaković, music: Dragiša Baša	3:55
9.	"Sudbino reci (Fate, Tell Me)"	lyrics: Marina Tucaković, music: Danijel Pavlović	3:38
10.	"Moli me (Beg Me)"	Dragiša Baša	4:07
