= Uroš Đurić =

Serbian actor and artist

- Урош Ђурић
- Born: 4 December 1964 (age 61); Belgrade, SR Serbia, SFR Yugoslavia
- Education: University of Belgrade Faculty of Philosophy; University of Arts in Belgrade
- Known for: Painting
- Notable work: Populist Project
- Website: www.urosdjuric.net

Uroš Đurić (Serbian Cyrillic: Урош Ђурић; born 4 December 1964) is a Serbian conceptual artist, actor and painter based in Belgrade. He studied art history at the University of Belgrade Faculty of Philosophy and painting at the Faculty of Fine Arts in Belgrade. In 1980, he took part in Belgrade punk movement by joining Urbana Gerila as a drummer. Đurić became an active participant of the Belgrade art scene since 1989 by founding the Autonomist (anti)movement together with Stevan Markuš. In 1994, they published the “Autonomism Manifesto”. During the 1990s, he often appears in feature films, works as graphic designer and as DJ at Academy night club, known as "Rupa" (english: the hole). Contributor to several documentaries and underground comics publishing. Founder of Remont gallery & art magazine. From 1992 to 2010, he collaborated with Belgrade Radio B92. In 2013–2018, he was one of the "Chasers" in Потера, the Serbian version of The Chase quiz show.

== On the Conceptual Basis of the Works in Uroš Đurić’s Art Practice ==
by Stevan Vuković

“The author and the work are only the starting points of an analysis whose horizon is a language: there cannot be a science of Dante, Shakespeare, or Racine but only a science of discourses.”

Roland Barthes

Uroš Đurić’s strong presence in the popular media as a public personality, and his very charismatic appearance, constitute the major obstacles in grasping the specificity of the discourses he develops in order to intervene in the field of contemporary art and culture. What usually happens when his works, especially the ones that feature images of himself, are interpreted without insight into the grammar of visual language and into the conceptual strategies he uses, can easily be designated as a “naturalistic mistake”. It consists of equating micro-histories of his personal biography, as the biography of an empirical person who is the author of certain artworks, with the narratives that make up the visual content of those works, and with the features of the represented characters. The fact that he gets engaged with popular culture both in the fields of subcultures and of cultural industries (as an actor, radio host, underground punk musician), and in the field of critical and experimental visual art (as an author who recycles samples and schematics of popular culture in his work, which is mostly figural) gets condensed into a view of his works as functioning as “the organic representations” of those mechanisms of cultural production and of those subcultures.

“It is about the projection of personality as a mediator of ideas”, said Uroš Đurić in an interview published in 1996, explaining the role of his own image in the paintings he was producing at the time, adding that the “self-portrait makes it a historically determined model, the specific feature being that, in this case, the image of the author is activated as a part of the content by being included in the representation”. From this quote, it is quite clear that, at least on the level of intentionality, the image of the author is not used as a simple mirror-image of himself or of his identity belongings and affiliations, but as a tool for conceptual manoeuvres. Therefore, Uroš Đurić may appear as an “organic intellectual”, in the sense of visually codifying and making more coherent, presenting and making more broadly present in the public, a specific shared non-hegemonic and, both culturally and socially, underrepresented world-view “in a way that is directive and organizational, i.e. educative, i.e. intellectual”, but he does not do that as someone who enters the field of art from the outside. He does that as an artist fully belonging to it, and being formed by it, and within it. Thereby, he acts in a synthetic manner, as a link between the life worlds where minor cultures are developed, and the elitist art world, as defined in its hegemonic role. Uroš Đurić even made that clear himself in a discussion with the local art critic and art journalist Danijela Purešević, by stating the following: “I use figuration the way Duchamp used ready-made. I use figuration dually. And I am not a figurative painter. I am a pure conceptualist”.

Uroš Đurić is not a punk who paints. He performs conceptual manoeuvres by using a specific “painterly style” (or “style of representation” in his later works that are not paintings) treated as a ready-made. That enables him to resample different historical styles without actually paying tribute either to the artists who originally used them or to the actual times and contexts of use. He uses the surface of the painting, drawing, photography or a digital collage as a screen for projecting, not his own empirically and psychologically framed visions and desires, but those specific social issues that go far beyond what is screened in the public media or conventionally shown in major art shows. By using his own image in paintings, photographs, and digital collages, he produces an art of signs, an art of discourse, questioning the effects of visual images on the usual perception of identity, history and culture, and testing the implications of the use of these images for the art system and the models of perception of artworks as such. The subjectivity he demonstrates is not simply taken for granted but is already “deconstructed, taken apart, and shifted, without anchorage”. It is rooted in language and effective in the realm of the symbolic. In his work, he places his self-representations at quite a distance from the psycho-biographic realm, which would be just visualized. As Roland Barthes stated, the life of the author cannot be considered as “the origin of his fables, but a fable that runs concurrently with his work.”

Autonomism and Populism

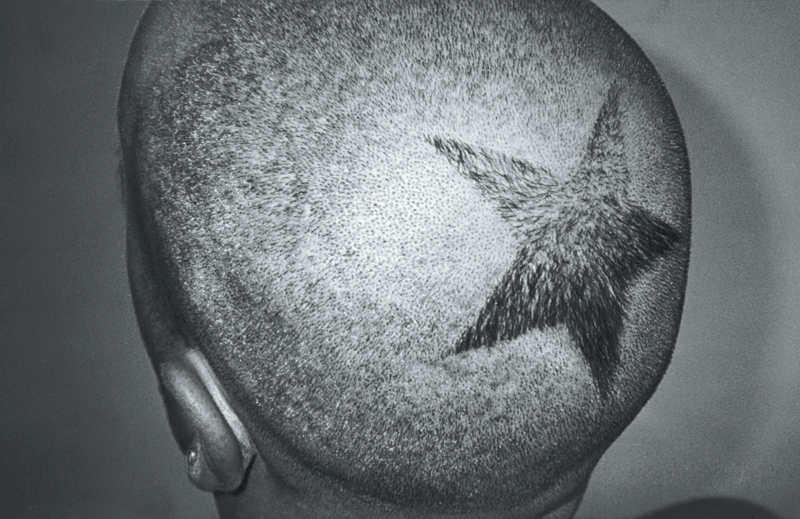
Untitled (Black Star), 1999, Ludwig Collection (MUMOK), Vienna

In 1994, Uroš Đurić wrote, together with Stevan Markuš, a manifesto entitled “The Autonomism Manifesto”. It was written in February and March 1994, and published as a leaflet, to be later included in the catalogue of their joint exhibition, held in Pančevo in June 1995. “It was created to reduce to a minimum the possibility of shallow stories about our painting”, stated their text of the Manifesto, referring to the history of its own making. Going back to the experiences of the local historical avant-gardes, namely, Zenitism, whose manifesto these artists not only quoted in their own manifesto but even claimed to repeat, they looked for a way to avoid being listed among the “urban section” of “figurative painters”, following the “other line” of former Yugoslav art, who institutionalized those practices within the histories of neo-avant-gardes, of neo-constructivists, conceptual and process art movements, considered to be tendencies of “radical”, as opposed to “soft” modernism. They also did not feel quite comfortable with the concept of “monumental intimism”, which placed them amongst the authors active in the “interspace between high art and the underground”, with Đile Marković and Zoran Marinković, in the close proximity of authors such as Daniel Glid and Jasmina Kalić. Their use of images was more denaturalized than those of the artists who were reputedly stylistically close to them. Their relationship with the “underground”, on the other hand, was on the level of repetition of visual samples that were part of the imagery of empowerment, but in a context that was not the context of subcultures – they played with different rhetorical operations within the language of art, but materialized mainly as paintings of conventional format, and executed in conventional techniques, like oil on canvas. “We are classics”, they stated, in an ironic manner, while they were still students, and they said that in order to oppose classifications. They wanted histories of their own, ones that escape the constraints of theory-led production, art-historian-dominated interpretation, and exhibiting within the framework imposed by curators. They wanted to create the context in which their work is produced, viewed and exhibited. That was Autonomism.

In the late nineties, Uroš Đurić started exhibiting mainly without Stevan Markuš. He switched his preferred techniques from oil painting and charcoal drawing to electronic collages, photographs, performances and whatever else might come as the most appropriate medium for the realization of some concrete project. What he kept was a passionate attachments to self-portraits, so that his own image still played the “theoretical object” in most of the works, only the process and the final result were much more open with respect to the manner of realization that before. His major project for the end of the nineties, and the project through which he developed another referential frame for his works, was entitled The Populist Project. As the author stated himself, the main objective of the project was to show the interaction between the star system and identity. Its components were titled God Loves the Dreams of Serbian Artists, Celebrities, Hometown Boys and Pioneers. The images of the author featured in different segments of the project, presenting him as part of the most prominent football teams in Europe, in the company of various public personalities, on the cover of an imaginary magazine entitled “Hometown Boys”, and among the most prominent authors in the field of art production and interpretation from what was once geopolitically labelled as Eastern Europe, all of whom were shown as proudly wearing a red pioneer scarf, in a glorious posture taken from the iconography of socialist realism. With this project, he went against the stereotypical social and political, not so much art-historical framing of his works. While most left-wing scholars in Serbia dealt with the issue of populism as determined to serve the right wing ideology, he demonstrated that populism had no pre-articulated social implication, and that in order to enter the struggle in the public arena, one has to be able to articulate it. His manner of articulation was rooted in the antagonistic potential of all the popular interpellations, connecting his populist project with the heritage of populist anarchism, which reappeared locally on the grass roots level whenever the local population was to be turned into members of a nation, party, etc. Instead of producing representations of all the invisible parts of the society within the field of art, which is the prevailing paradigm of socially specific works, he went directly into the populist media to work on antagonizing the attitudes towards the public images of celebrities, including his own, using those media the way he used canvas.

Integral version of the text was published in: Umelec international 3/2006
