= Ljubav, navika, panika =

Serbian sitcom television program

- DVD cover
- Created by: Nebojša Romčević, Slobodan Šuljagić
- Directed by: Slobodan Šuljagić
- Starring: Jelisaveta Seka Sabljić; Nikola Simić; Marija Karan (replaced by Borka Tomović); Mirka Vasiljević; Zijah Sokolović
- Theme music composer: Željko Joksimović
- Opening theme: Ljubav, navika, panika (Vocals by Željko Joksimović)
- Ending theme: Ljubav, navika, panika End Theme (Vocals by Željko Joksimović)
- Country of origin: Serbia
- Original language: Serbian
- No. of seasons: 3
- No. of episodes: 58

Production
- Executive producer: Jelena Miširkić
- Producer: Željko Mitrović
- Running time: 25 minutes

Original release
- Network: RTV Pink; Red TV
- Release: 6 February 2005 – 1 April 2007

Ljubav, navika, panika (English: Love, Habit, Panic) is a Serbian sitcom, originally broadcast from 6 February 2005 to 1 April 2007 on RTV Pink. in 2005, the series was named by Golden Rose of Montreux as one of the best sitcoms. It remains one of the most popular Serbian television series from the 2000s.

The lead roles were portrayed by some of Serbia's best comedians, Seka Sablić, Nikola Simić and Zijah Sokolović; and young actresses Marija Karan and Mirka Vasiljević. Karan was replaced by Borka Tomović in 2006. Supporting and guest roles include Nada Macanković, Ljiljana Stjepanović, Gorica Popović, Vesna Trivalić, etc. The sitcom was shot in Belgrade.

== Plot ==
After many years of marriage, Vera (Seka Sablić) and Mića (Nikola Simić) decide to divorce. But, neither Vera nor Mića want to leave the apartment, and their daughters, Maja (Marija Karan) and Janja (Mirka Vasiljević). So, they decided to divorce, but to remain living together. Vera and Mića are still in love, but they don't want to admit it. They're happy making the other one jealous, or making some jokes to each other.

== Cast ==
- Seka Sablić as Vera Milićević
- Nikola Simić as Mića Milićević
- Mirka Vasiljević as Janja Milićević
- Marija Karan as Maja Milićević
- Borka Tomović as Maja Milićević
- Zijah Sokolović as Mr Jovanović
- Nada Macanković as Maca
- Ljiljana Stjepanović as Kića
- Gorica Popović as Professor Alimpijević
- Vesna Trivalić as Smiljka

== Awards and nominations ==
- 2006: Golden Rose of Montreux for the Best Actress - Mirka Vasiljević (Nominated)
- 2007: Niš Film Festival Screen Couple of the Year by Večernje novosti - Seka Sablić & Nikola Simić (Won)
