= Vesna Trivalić =

Serbian actress (born 1965)

- Весна Тривалић
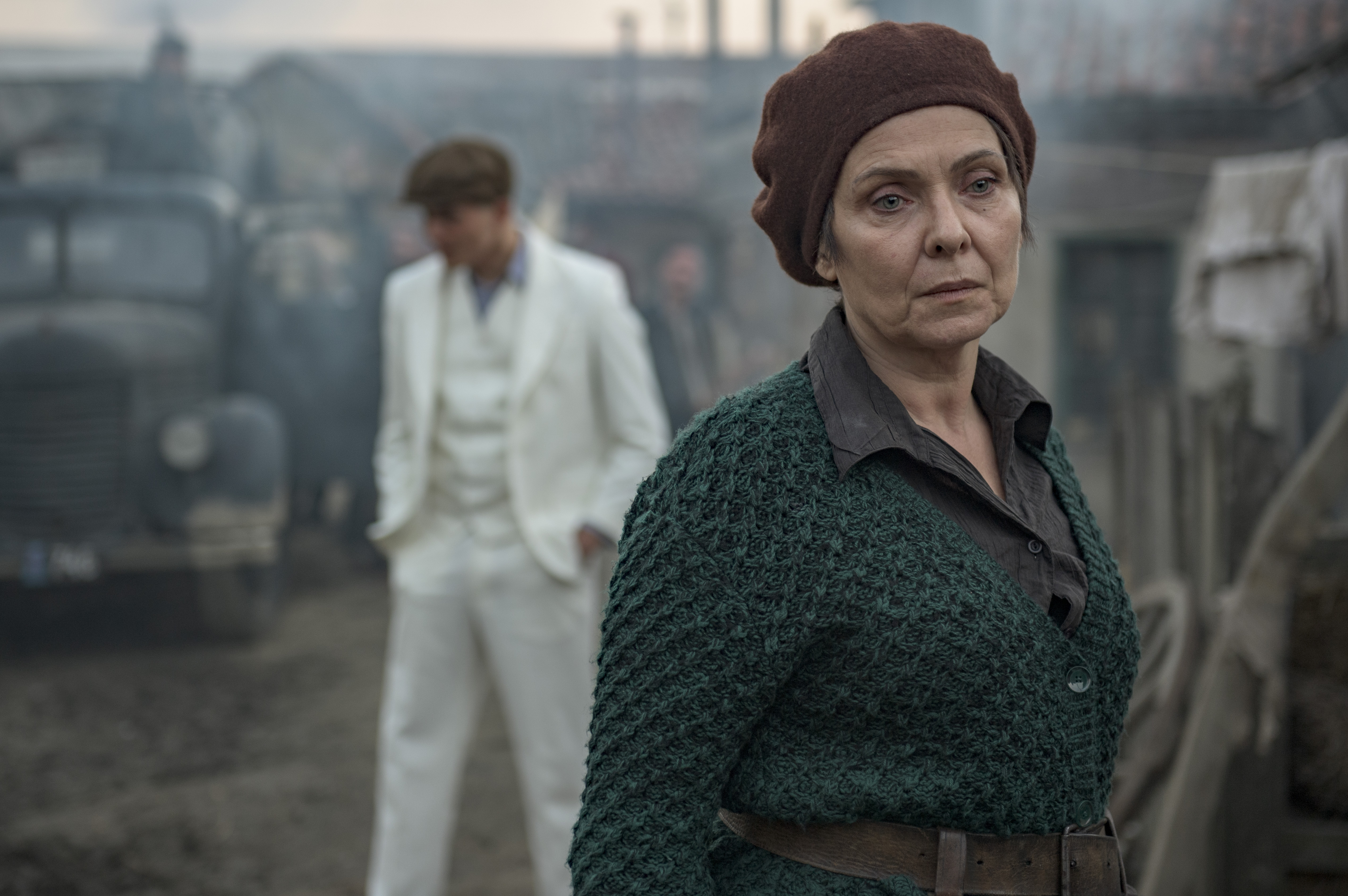
- Vesna Trivalić in Balkan Shadows
- Born: 13 March 1965 (age 61); Belgrade, SR Serbia, SFR Yugoslavia
- Education: Faculty of Dramatic Arts
- Occupation: Actress
- Years active: 1986–present
- Spouse: Nenad Pandurović (m. 2001)
- Children: 1

Vesna Trivalić (Serbian Cyrillic: Весна Тривалић; born 13 March 1965) is a Serbian actress.

== Career ==
Trivalić studied at the Faculty of Dramatic Arts in Belgrade. Trivalić mainly plays supporting roles. She is known for her voice-work and has done numerous TV commercials, including commercials for JAT Airways.

== Personal life ==
She got married in 2001, and had a son, Nikola, in 2004.

== Selected filmography ==
=== Film ===
| Year | Title | Role | Notes |
|---|---|---|---|
| 1987 | Oktoberfest | | |
| 1992 | Tito and me | | |
| 1998 | Zla žena | | |
| 2000 | Rat uživo | | |
| 2004 | Life is a miracle | Jadranka | |
| 2016 | Stado | Vida | |
| 2022 | Komedija na tri sprata | Natalija | |

=== Television ===
| Year | Title | Role | Notes |
|---|---|---|---|
| 1989–1993 | Metla bez drške | Jelena | TV series |
| 1990–1991 | Bolji život | Ljiljana Popović | TV series |
| 1994–1995; 2013–2014 | Otvorena vrata | Katarina "Cakana" Anđelić | TV series |
| 1998–2002 | Porodično blago | Bisenija Gavrilović | TV series |
| 2005–2006 | Ljubav, navika, panika | Smiljka Jovanović | TV series |
| 2007–2008 | Vratiće se rode | Dušanka | TV series |
| 2019 | Balkan Shadows | Draginja | TV series |
