= Zrenjanin Court House =

Coordinates: 45°22′45″N 20°23′17″E

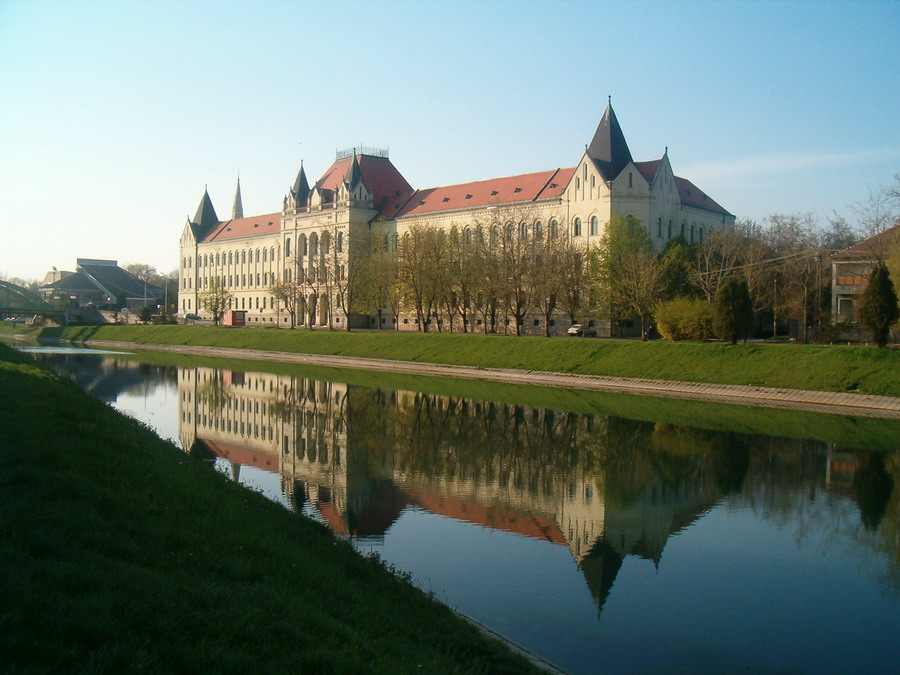
Zrenjanin Court House today

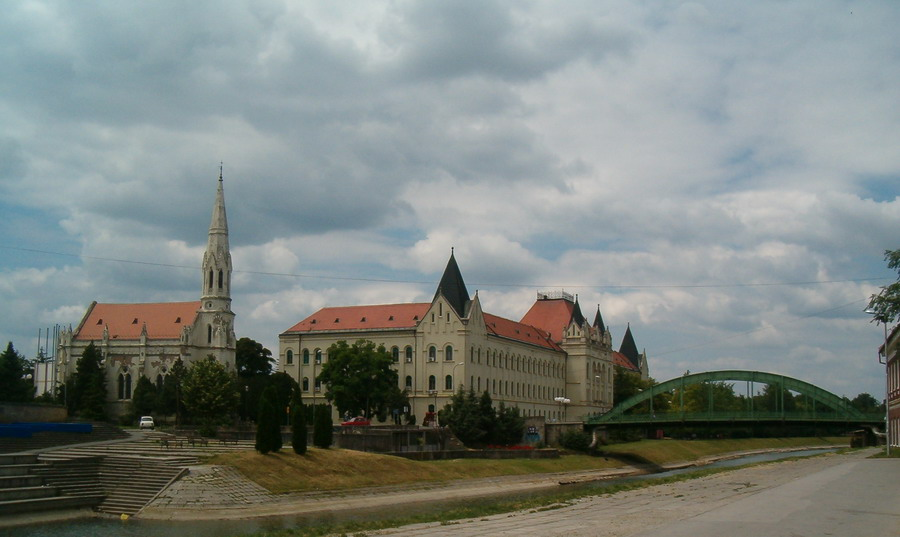
Court House surrounding: Protestant church and the Small bridge

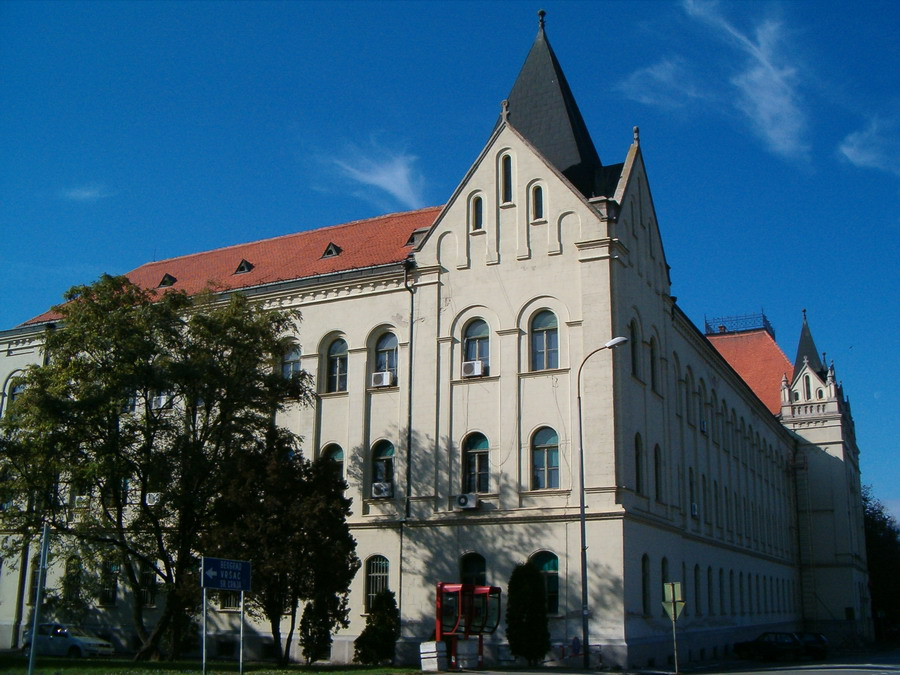
Right cupola of the Court House

Zrenjanin Court House, also known as Palace of Justice (Serbian: Палата правде / Palata pravde, Hungarian: Igazságügyi palota) is a seat of Municipal, District and Trade Court in Zrenjanin.

== Building ==
The monumental Neromantical building of the District Court dates from the beginning of the 20th century. Construction works started in 1906 and were finished in 1908. It has a dominant long facade along with the Begej river bank, cupolas at the corners of the building. The central risalit at the same time represents the most thoroughly modelled part of the building.

The building was built according to the projects of two architects from Budapest, who won at the contest - Sándor Eigner and Marcus Rehmer.

The Court House represents one of the major symbols of Zrenjanin. There are several interesting objects in the close surrounding; next to it is a Protestant church, and a Small bridge in front of it. Across the river is the Trade academy.

== Trivia ==
Most of the workers who built the Court House were women.

== See also ==
- Zrenjanin
