= István Kiss (architect) =

Hungarian architect

István Kiss (May 4, 1857 – January 9, 1902) was an architect from Austria-Hungary.

Kiss was born in Körösladány. He finished his studies at Budapest University in 1880 and, between 1882 and 1885, travelled overseas on state scholarship. He subsequently gained teaching qualifications In the 1890s he mainly built judicial and court buildings. The most significant of these are in Braşov, Oradea, Banská Bystrica and Locs. He died in Budapest, aged 44.

== Major works ==
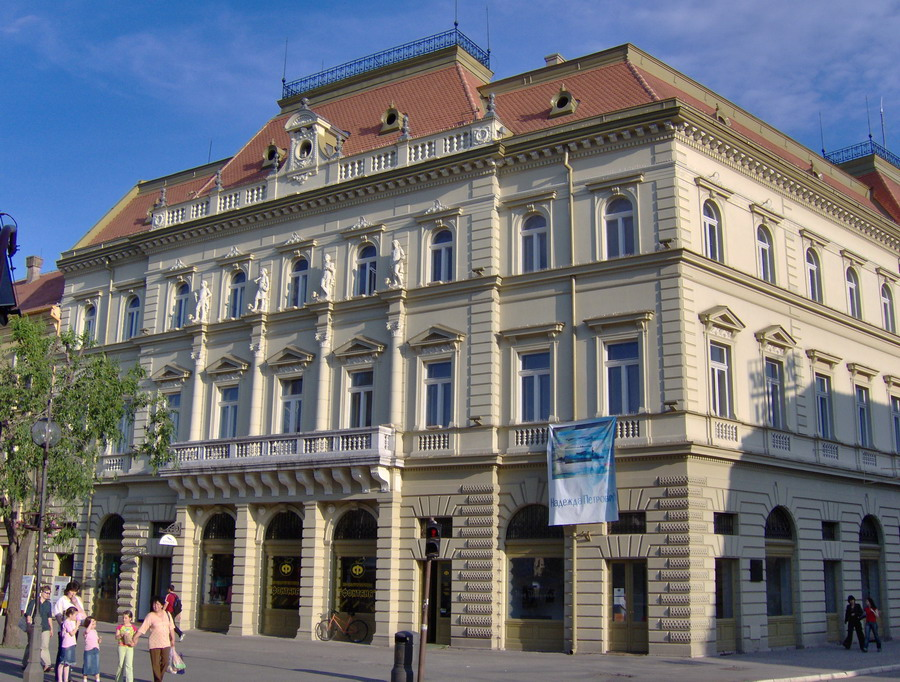
Zrenjanin Finance palace

- Veszprém County Hall
- Komárom Court House
- Kalocsa Court House
- Oradea Court House
- Miskolc Court House
- Zrenjanin Finance palace
- Zrenjanin Trade academy
- Budapest Baross street maternity clinic and Budapest St. John hospital.
