= Trade Academy =

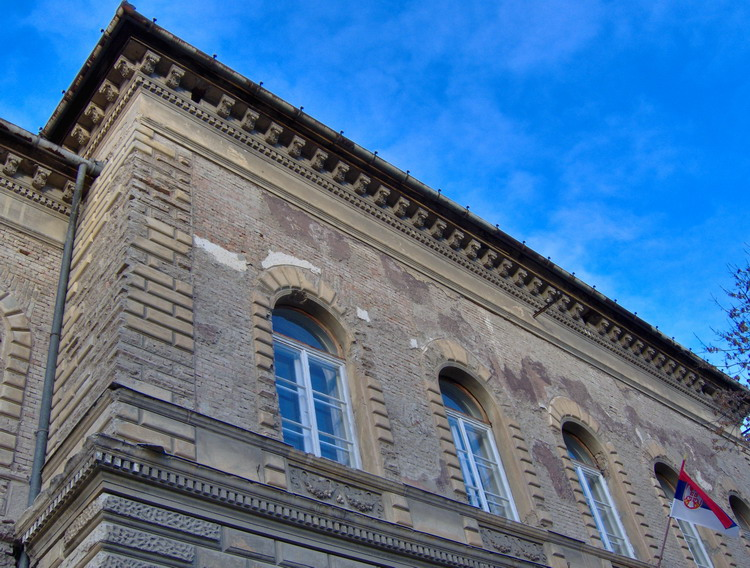
Main facade of Trade academy

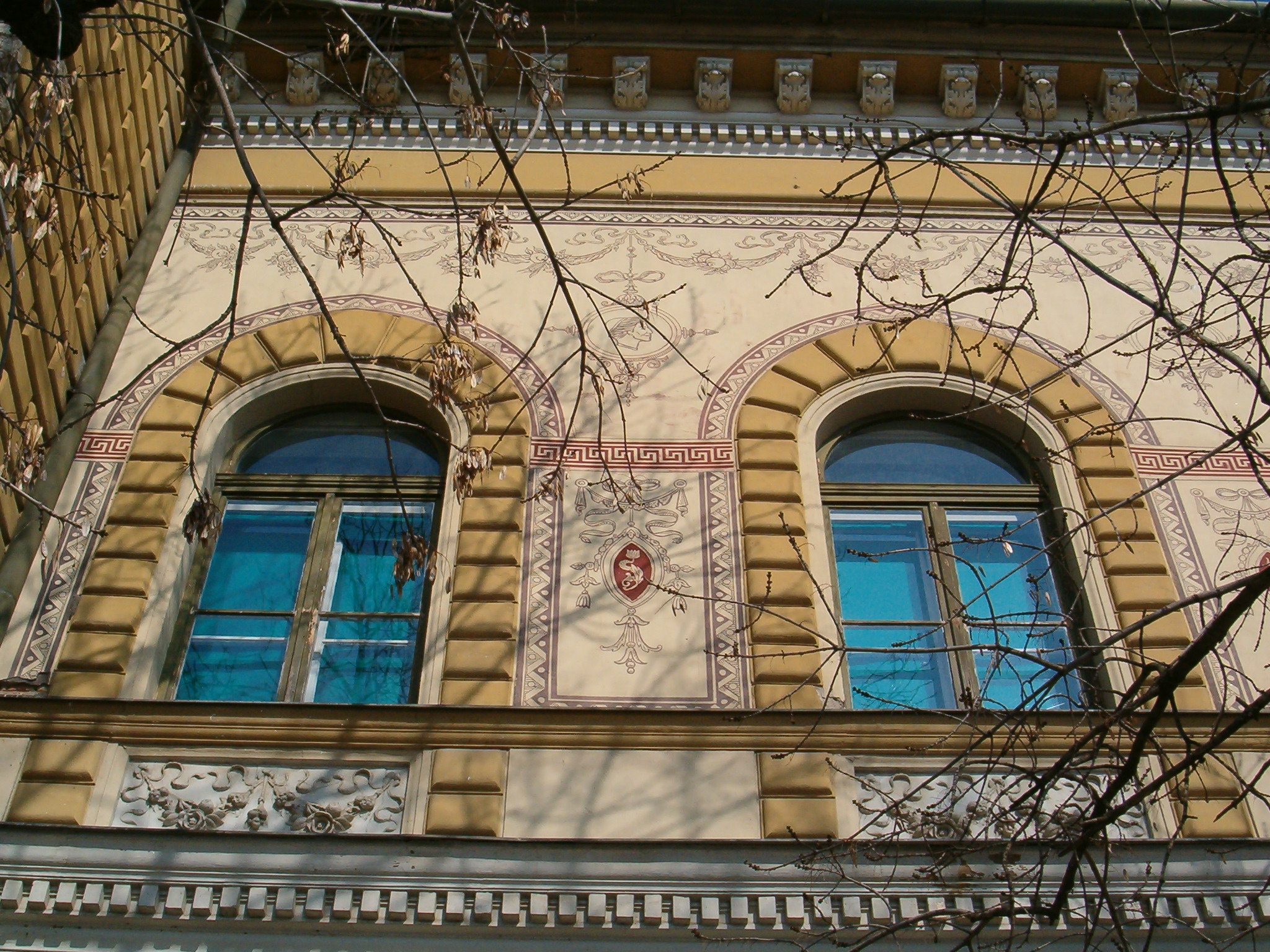
Windows of Trade academy decorated with sgraffito

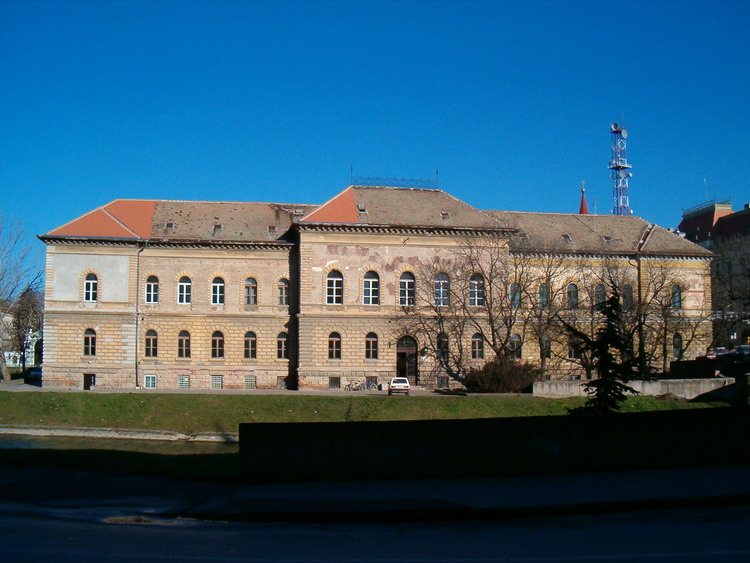
View of Trade academy from across the lake and Court house

Trade academy (Serbian: Трговачка академија) is located at the bank of the Begej river, in Zrenjanin, Serbia.

== History ==
Trade academy was built in 1892 by the projects of Hungarian architect István Kiss. Kiss used Florentian sort of Neo-Renaissance, combined with masterful sgraffito technique on the upper floor. Main facade looks at the Begej river (turned into lake in 1985) and Court house across it. This was Kiss's first building in Zrenjanin (then Nagybecskerek) after which he projected Finance palace, nearby Trade academy.

== "Trade academy" ==
Trade academy (today Economics school "Jovan Trajković") was founded in 1895 and moved in a newly built building. School moved from this building in 1983, when the School of Electrical engineering "Nikola Tesla" was founded and moved in. Since then, Economics school works in a new building.

== Today ==
Building of Trade academy is now used by Electrical engineering school. One half of the building, towards Subotićeva street and National museum building, was last time renovated in 1982. Other half of the building is in a very bad condition. Sgraffito decoration is only visible from Subotićeva street.
