= Small Bridge =

Small Bridge around 1910

Small Bridge in the 1930s

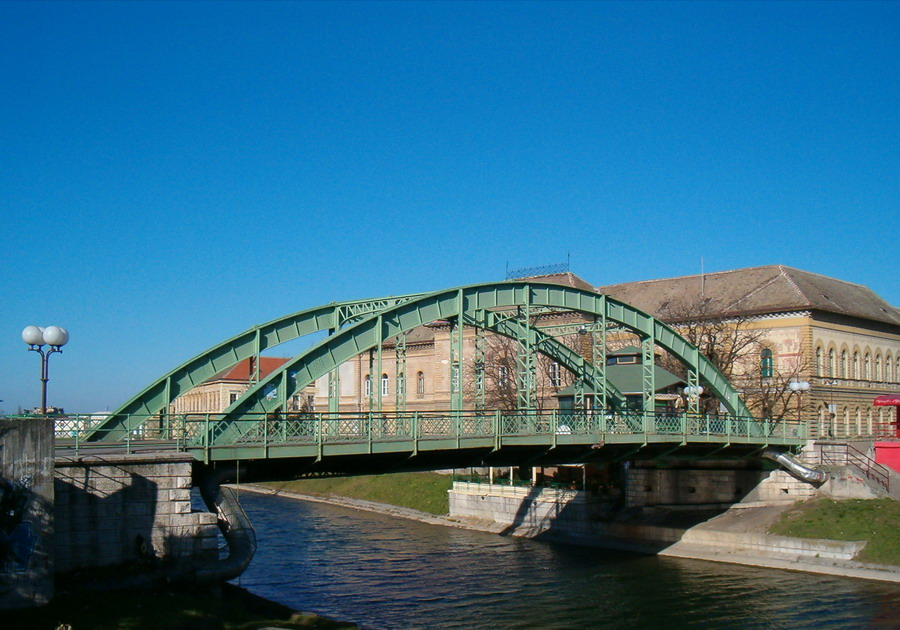
Small Bridge today

Small Bridge (Serbian Cyrillic: Мали мост, romanized: Mali most) is the oldest bridge in Zrenjanin, Serbia.

Today's steel bridge was built in 1904, on the site of an older movable wooden bridge, when it was named Franz Joseph Bridge (Serbian Cyrillic: Мост Францa Јозефa, romanized: Most Franca Jozefa, German: Franz Josefs Brücke, Hungarian: Ferencz Jozsef híd), and after 1919 it took the name Karadžić Bridge.

The length of the Bridge is 31 meters, width 9 meters and height 5.5 meters. It is decorated with a regular arch construction in the form of a section of a circle.
