= Pinkove Zvezde =

2014 Serbian television programme

- Genre: Reality competition
- Created by: Željko Mitrović
- Presented by: Ognjen Amidžić; Bojana Lazić; Anđela Ašanin
- Judges: Desingerica; Viki Miljković; Zorica Brunclik; Jelena Karleuša; Dragan Stojković Bosanac
- Country of origin: Serbia
- Original language: Serbian
- No. of series: 5
- No. of episodes: 40 per season

Production
- Running time: 180 – 240 minutes
- Production company: City Records

Original release
- Network: Pink
- Release: 13 September 2014 – present

Pinkove Zvezde (Serbian: Пинкове Звезде, lit. 'Pink Stars') is a Serbian reality television music competition organized by City Records to find new singing talents. The contestants are aspiring singers drawn from public auditions. The show entered its fifth season in 2025.

== Series overview ==
To date, 5 series have been broadcast, as summarised below.
Winning contestant

Series	Year	Winner	From	Judges
1	2014/15	Ivan Kurtić	Serbia	Bora Đorđević; Ceca; Haris Džinović; Marina Tucaković; Miroslav Ilić
2	2015/16	Mite Stoilkov	North Macedonia	Bora Đorđević; Ceca; Haris Džinović; Marina Tucaković; Miroslav Ilić
3	2016/17	Indira Beriša (judges' vote)	Serbia	Dara Bubamara; Dragana Mirković; Zorica Brunclik; Aleksandra Radović; Šaban Šaulić; Maja Nikolić
3	2016/17	Ismail Delija (public vote)	Montenegro	Dara Bubamara; Dragana Mirković; Zorica Brunclik; Aleksandra Radović; Šaban Šaulić; Maja Nikolić
4	2019	Piksi i Zeka	Serbia	Damir Handanović; Dušica Jakovljević; Srđan Todorović; Kija Kockar; Sloba Radanović
5	2025/26	Stefan Cekić; Mentor: Desingerica	Serbia	Dragomir Despić; Viki Miljković; Zorica Brunclik; Jelena Karleuša; Dragan Stojković Bosanac

== Regional broadcasts ==
Country	Channel	Premiere date
Serbia	Pink TV	2014
Bosnia and Herzegovina	Pink BH	2014
Montenegro	Pink M	2014
Slovenia	Pink SI	2014
