= Al Jazeera Balkans =

Television channel

- Official logo since 2011
- Type: Digital-first news platform (Formerly: Satellite & cable television channel)
- Country: Bosnia and Herzegovina
- Broadcast area: Former Yugoslavia and global diaspora
- Headquarters: Trg djece Sarajeva 1 (ARIA Centar), Sarajevo

Programming
- Language: Serbo-Croatian

Ownership
- Owner: Al Jazeera Media Network
- Key people: Tarik Đođić (General Director)

History
- Launched: November 11, 2011
- Closed: July 31, 2025, on linear television; resumed as a digital news service on November 1, 2026

Links
- Website: balkans.aljazeera.net

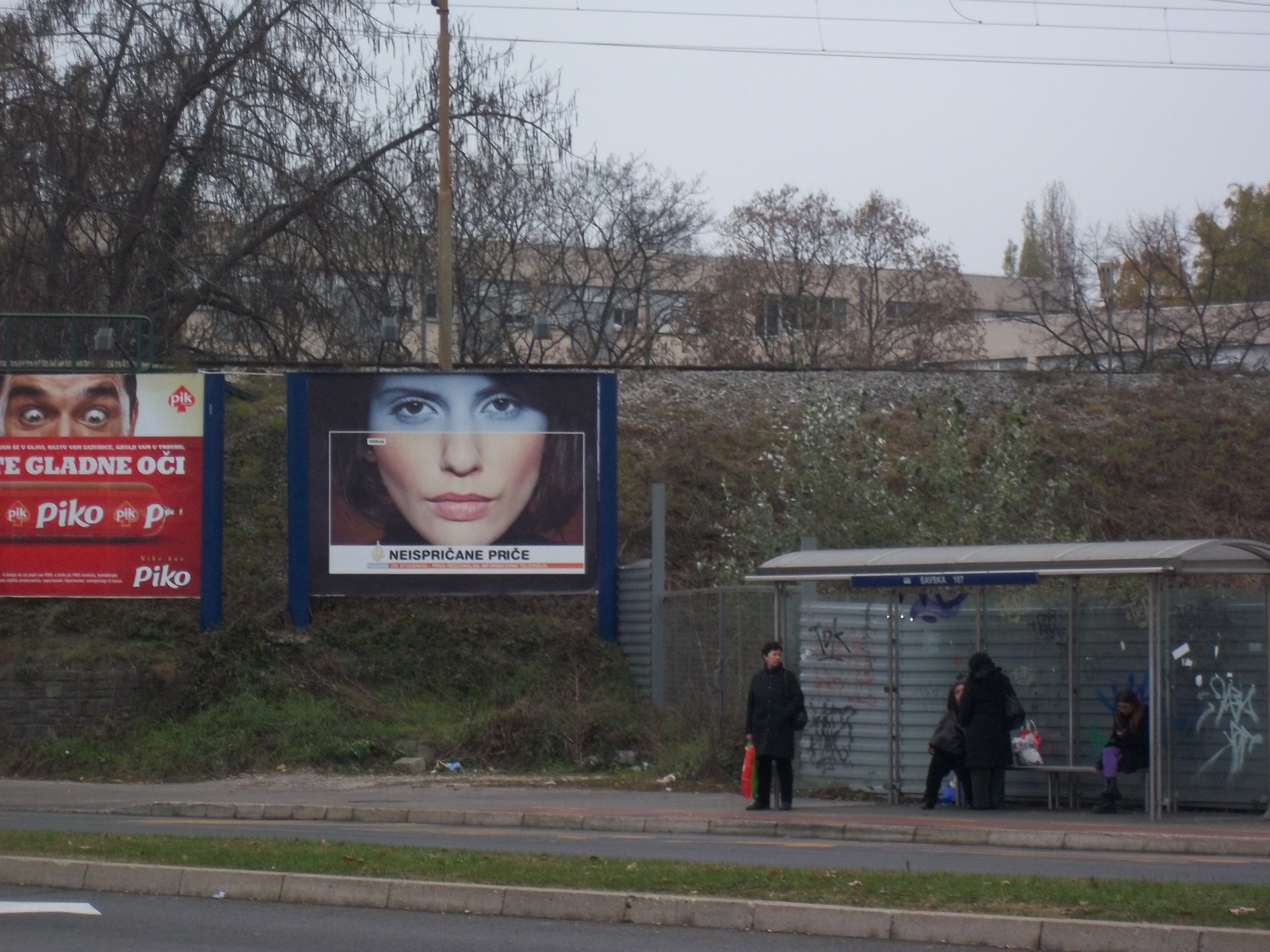
Al Jazeera Balkans poster in Zagreb in late November 2011

Al Jazeera Balkans (AJB) is a digital-first media platform covering the Balkans, headquartered in Sarajevo, Bosnia and Herzegovina. The network, which was first founded in November 2011 as a conventional regional television station, broadcasts news, current events, and documentaries tailored for audiences in Bosnia and Herzegovina, Croatia, Montenegro, North Macedonia, Serbia, Slovenia, and Kosovo, among other former Yugoslavia. It is an Al Jazeera Media Network subsidiary.

The channel underwent a comprehensive corporate restructuring after its cable and satellite television broadcast operations were completely shut down in the mid-2025. Al Jazeera Balkans formally relaunched as a digital-first platform on November 1, 2026, coinciding with its parent network's 30th anniversary. Short-form digital explainers, podcasts, and country-specific news verticals intended for both local audiences and the Balkan diaspora replaced traditional linear television programming blocks in the new format.

== History ==
=== Purchase ===
On 22 September 2010, after months of speculation, the Qatari government-endowed Al Jazeera Media Network announced the US$1.56 million purchase of NTV 99, a local channel based in Sarajevo, Bosnia and Herzegovina. Named Al Jazeera Balkans (AJB), the project was envisioned as "a leader in providing high quality news and current affairs in the region [of former Yugoslavia]" with planned offices throughout the Balkans and bureaus in key locations worldwide.

=== Preparation ===
Soon after the purchase announcement, Al Jazeera made a lease agreement with BBI Real Estate regarding the usage of the 800m^{2} space at the top floors of Sarajevo's ARIA Centar. The station also leased office space in the B2 building located at the top of Balkanska Street in central Belgrade, across the street from Hotel Moskva, converting it into a remote television studio.

In parallel, it set about staffing its planned Balkans operation whose launch was set for January 2011. With the Slobodna Bosna newsmagazine reporting Al Jazeera Balkans offering minimum monthly salaries in excess of €1,000 as well as 5-year term contracts, the run on the station by interested local journalists was sizable.

The network also decided to go after marquee local names for top editorial and/or management positions. It began looking at Croatian state broadcaster HRT's personnel in this regard with Aleksandar Stanković, Denis Latin, and Goran Milić being mentioned as potential transfer targets. Other established names being discussed were additional Yutel veterans such as Zekerijah Smajić and Ivica Puljić, as well as former HRT and Nova TV personality Mirjana Hrga, and Arijana Saračević-Helać from Federalna televizija. However, Stanković reportedly turned down the news director post, saying he was not interested in a management position at this stage of his career. At one point local Sarajevo outlets even announced Latin as AJB's new general director while Milić explicitly denied any negotiations with the network. In the end, the opposite occurred with Milić getting the news director job while Latin eventually decided to stay put at HRT. For the general director position, Al Jazeera hired Tarik Đođić, former general secretary at the Bosnia-Herzegovina Foreign Trade Chamber (VTK).

By the beginning of 2011 it was clear the planned January launch would be postponed as Milić was finishing up at HRT with a rousing sendoff following his final Dnevnik newscast. The veteran broadcaster soon moved to Sarajevo, marking his professional return to the city having previously worked there from 1990 until 1992, first as part of Yutel and later as the Bosnian government's spokesperson in the initial months of the Bosnian War.

In late March 2011, the station aimed for a late summer / early fall launch in September, with news director Milić reflecting on how Al Jazeera Balkans might fit into the Balkans media scene: "There are over 100 television stations in the region [former Yugoslavia] at the moment. We cannot hope to compete with them on the local level, but Al Jazeera will offer its regional access, an idea which was abandoned in the 90s due to wars and emotions those conflicts triggered".

Over the coming months, Al Jazeera Balkans looked into different broadcast models. For a while it entertained the idea of taking over a local station in each of the former Yugoslav countries and turning them into broadcast affiliates. To that end, news appeared about the Qatar Media Corporation making a €25 million bid for TV Avala, a Serbian network with nationwide broadcasting license controlled by Serbian tycoon Željko Mitrović. The approach was confirmed by TV Avala's general manager Bojana Lekić, receiving significant coverage in the Serbian media, especially after information appeared about the Al Jazeera Balkans job interview process including a question about the status of Kosovo. Reportedly, Al Jazeera Balkans wanted to know explicitly where their prospective journalist employees, particularly those from Serbia, stood on the issue of Kosovo's independence. Asked about this hiring practice, news director Milić said: "I can't recall specifically whether that question was asked, but I believe it had been. Those are the questions we ask because we must know what our journalists think about certain issues. Our starting point is the reality that in this part of the world certain countries recognize Kosovo as an independent state while others do not".

The affiliate broadcast model was ultimately abandoned as AJB opted for individual deals with local cable and IPTV providers. Additionally, it decided to provide terrestrial coverage in the Sarajevo area as well as satellite transmission and live web streaming on its own site and on YouTube.

=== Launch ===
With €15 million reportedly invested in the project (according to general director Đođić), Al Jazeera Balkans began broadcasting on 11 November 2011, launching their website on the same day. The network's visual appearance was mainly based on that of its English-language counterpart, which lasted until 1 February 2015, when the channel adopted a new graphics package that looked more similar to Al Jazeera America. It broadcast from the Eutelsat W3C satellite, and also offered a live web stream just like its Arabic and English counterparts.

=== Final broadcast and signal shutdown ===
Al Jazeera Balkans ceased live news broadcasting on 12 July 2025, concluding nearly 14 years of continuous operation since its launch in 2011. The final live news program aired at 12:00 PM local time, with news presenter Dalija Hasanbegović delivering the closing sign-off. In her farewell message, Hasanbegović expressed gratitude to viewers for their sustained trust and support, highlighting the channel’s dedication to providing a platform for underrepresented voices and upholding the principles of truthful and ethical journalism.

Following the final live broadcast, Al Jazeera Balkans continued to air pre-recorded content until the end of July 2025, after which the channel’s signal was scheduled to be discontinued.

The parent company, based in Doha, has not publicly disclosed detailed reasons for the closure; however, reports suggest that financial considerations and strategic business decisions played a significant role. The shutdown affected more than 250 employees.

=== Relaunch as a digital-first platform (2026) ===
The network announced plans to resume operations exclusively as an internet-based medium after completely shutting down its cable and traditional television broadcast signal in July 2025, which affected over 200 media workers. The channel's targeted online content received close to 100 million views during a preliminary soft-launch period on social media covering local developments.

Al Jazeera Balkans formally relaunched as a dedicated digital-first platform on November 1, 2026, coinciding with the Al Jazeera Media Network's 30th anniversary. The website added country-specific categories for Albania, Bosnia and Herzegovina, Croatia, Kosovo, and North Macedonia under an expanded regional editorial layout. Short-form digital explainers, podcasts, and an interactive web portal targeted directly at local audiences and the larger Balkan diaspora in Western Europe and the US replaced the place of traditional television programming blocks in the updated format.

== Audience and programming ==
According to a report from the Associated Press, "media experts say they hope the broadcaster will offer objective news to a public that was exposed for two decades to local media heavily influenced by politics." Al Jazeera Balkans had a modern studio in Sarajevo and smaller studios in Belgrade and Zagreb. The station had correspondents in Podgorica, Pristina, Mostar, Banja Luka, and Skopje, who reported in the local variants of the Serbo-Croatian language. The station had reporters based in Washington, D.C., London, Berlin, Vienna, Moscow, Istanbul and Jerusalem by utilizing the resources of the current Al Jazeera bureaus around the world. The network served viewers in Bosnia and Herzegovina, Croatia, Kosovo, North Macedonia, Montenegro, Serbia, and Slovenia.

== Programmes ==
Al Jazeera Balkans produced its daily content as well as some weekly content (Al Jazeera Business and Sportski magazin) in its studios located at the ARIA Centar. Its weekly interview programmes, Oni pobjeđuju and Recite Al Jazeeri, were shot on remote locations.

== Reaction and reception ==
=== Bosnia and Herzegovina ===
With the September 2010 announcement of Qatar Media Corporation buying NTV 99 with a view of turning it into a Balkans-wide news channel, Boro Kontić, head of the Open Society-funded journalist training facility Mediacenter in Sarajevo, likened the arrival of the Arab media conglomerate to the atmosphere before the start of the Bosnian War, when it was announced that Sarajevo was to become regional headquarters for the European TV channel Euronews: "People aren't afraid of a new war, exactly, but rather political upheaval. People feel they are being monitored, if such a large international media company moves into the local market. But it has the potential to become an objective and independent information channel in the Balkans and it could also help to overcome the petty interests that arose after the disintegration of the former Yugoslavia - be it in Croatia, Serbia, Bosnia or Montenegro". In terms of Al Jazeera Balkans viewership prospects, Kontić said: "In the beginning it will probably be interesting for people to watch it, because they may be tired of local television stations -- so-called public stations, but what are in essence politically controlled. So they may be interested to see whether there is a different perspective on the region [from Al-Jazeera]. But we have a saying: a wonder lasts but three days".

Borka Rudić, general secretary of the Bosnian-Herzegovinian Journalists Association, found Al Jazeera's decision to come to Bosnia-Herzegovina especially interesting in light of the country not having a strong media market, saying: "Money is not the reason behind the network's decision to settle here. No TV station is completely immune to the desire for political influence. I believe Al Jazeera will affect the public opinion in Bosnia, but I don't fear the strengthening influence of radical Islamic forces. I do not think that the arrival of Al Jazeera immediately increases the influence from the East, or that this was the motive for Al Jazeera to settle in Sarajevo".

=== Serbia ===
The June 2011 revelation of Al Jazeera Balkans asking its job applicants to state their personal position/opinion regarding the international status of Kosovo with the answer potentially determining whether they get hired or not while at the same time making a takeover bid for Serbian nationwide television network TV Avala caused a lot of reaction in the country.

Slobodan Reljić, former editor-in-chief at the NIN magazine conveyed that he was not particularly shocked at the way Al Jazeera Balkans picks its staff, saying that contemporary global media outlets have given up on objective journalism. He further added:

They are going to hire a squad of young and good-looking 'warriors' for the station owner's 'cause'. Goran Milić is the right man for the job with loads of experience to execute that task in the 'most professional' manner because none of his personal beliefs will ever enter into it. He's been hired to do a job, and he's going to deliver the 'real' television. Al Jazeera is known for having learned their tricks from Western role models, from the BBC, which does it extremely 'professionally', after all.

Olivera Kovačević, RTS television host, touched on the issue of potential Al Jazeera Balkans journalists from Serbia having to disregard their own country's constitution if the station's hiring criterion is to treat Kosovo as an independent state: "The very act of asking that question during a job interview – thereby interrogating an applicant on his/her political orientation – is in breach of that person's human rights. I accept that every media outlet has an editorial policy, but no one can demand of me to ignore my country's laws and constitution that say Kosovo is part of Serbia. It's going to be a tough call for the broadcasting regulators in Serbia whether to allow an outlet with such policy to own a station that broadcasts nationally in Serbia".

The opposition Serbian Radical Party (SRS) called on the Serbian Broadcasting Agency (RRA) not to allow the Al Jazeera Balkans' purchase of TV Avala due to the "anti-Serb campaign led by the Al Jazeera director for the Balkans, Goran Milić". Speaking at party's press conference, SRS presidency collegium member Vjerica Radeta stated: "Milić has never ceased with his anti-Serb campaign, but the most scandalous of all is that the requirement to get a job at this station is accepting Kosovo as an independent state".

=== International ===
The Spectator's Fraser Nelson views Al Jazeera's arrival to the Balkans through the lens of the ongoing global "information war" and the Western media's current standing in that showdown. Discussing the situation in various spots around the globe, he contends that "the BBC has come under fierce competition from Al Jazeera", which the British haven't responded to adequately, bringing up the Balkans as an example where "the BBC World Service closed down its 21-man Serbian radio operation, while Al Jazeera Balkans set about hiring 150 people in Sarajevo headed by the veteran Croatian journalist Goran Milić". He goes on to praise this formula of having "local television champions" rather than "foisting Anderson Cooper on the world".

Tim Judah wrote a piece on the launch of Al Jazeera Balkans in The Economist, going through the various ethnic, religious, political, and linguistic specifics in the former Yugoslavia before wondering "whether people from one part of the Balkans are still interested in the others" outside of "enjoying each other's reality shows". Right after mentioning that "news broadcasts from Sarajevo, Banja Luka, Belgrade and Zagreb are all utterly different", Judah claims Al Jazeera Balkans faces the problem of "many Serbs and Croats assuming it is "Muslim" television". He concludes by saying that Al Jazeera's Arabic service played a key role in the Arab Spring and wonders "what sort of influence Qatar may want, or gain, in the Balkans".

Writing in his blog on The Weekly Standard web site, Stephen Schwartz sees Al Jazeera Balkans (AJB) as "the revival of a "Yugoslav" television network", bringing up AJB news director Goran Milić's past affiliation with Yutel, "a network that attempted to rescue Yugoslavia during its collapse, from 1990 to 1992". Schwartz concludes that "in entering the Balkans, Al Jazeera has opted for an attempted revival of a long-shattered Yugoslav cultural unity, combined with a gambit for greater Islamist influence", but also warns that "its decision comes at a bad time for the region, with Wahhabi radicals agitating across Balkan borders, and the neo-fundamentalist Turkish regime of Recep Tayyip Erdogan bidding for revived prestige in the former Ottoman provinces in Europe". As for the network's financial prospects, Schwartz expressed doubts "that evocation of the long-gone, artificial nationality of the former Yugoslavia will make Al Jazeera’s investment in the Balkans profitable", but offered a possibility of "corrupt politicians dominating the ex-Yugoslav successor states finding it lucrative to have connections to Gulf petrobillionaires".

Shawn Powers, assistant professor at the Georgia State University, claims the Al Jazeera network openly seeks to tap into Muslim-majority countries and markets it believes are hungry for a news agenda that is better tailored to their interests and is eager to tug the geopolitical center of gravity away from Europe and closer to the Arab World:

I think the decision about the Balkans, Turkey, and East Africa actually has to do with potential market shares, the fact that they think they can generate some revenue in these markets down the road. And of course there is also the strategic importance of each of these markets in the broader agenda of political Islam, and of turning countries toward the Middle East as opposed to away from the Middle East.

== Film festival ==
In 2018, Al Jazeera Balkans launched its documentary film festival the Al Jazeera Balkans Documentary Film Festival. Its first edition was held from 21 to 25 September 2018. The festival was established by Al Jazeera Balkans in cooperation with the Al Jazeera Media Network and the Doha-based Al Jazeera Media Institute. Al Jazeera Balkans is currently the biggest buyer of television format documentaries in the former Yugoslavia and annually acquires rights for most of the regional documentary films that are screened during the Sarajevo Film Festival. AJB DOC directly lent its concept from the Al Jazeera International Documentary Film Festival, which was founded in 2005 by Jordanian film director and writer, Abbas Arnaout.

== See also ==
- International broadcasting
- Al Jazeera English
- Al Jazeera America
- Al Jazeera Arabic
- Al Jazeera Türk
- AJ+
- Yutel

Competitors

- N1
