= TV Avala =

Serbian television network

- Type: Defunct Broadcast television network
- Country: Serbia
- Availability: Transformed into Pink 2
- Owner: Danko Đunić (45.65%); Željko Mitrović (4.95%); Ekonomski institut a.d. (0.99%); Greenberg Invest GmbH (48.41%)
- Key people: Dušan Pančić (editor-in-chief) market_share = 3.6% (2007)
- Launch date: September 17, 2006
- Dissolved: November 4, 2012
- Official website: www.tvavala.rs
- Replaced: RTS 3K
- Replaced by: Pink 2

TV Avala (full legal name: TV Avala d.o.o., Serbian Cyrillic: ТВ Авала) was a Serbian television network with national frequency. Registered as a limited liability company, the station was given a national TV frequency in Serbia in April 2006.

Five months after that, it premiered on September 17, 2006, at 8 pm. In its early days, TV Avala’s editorial policy and programming bore similarities to the former RTS 3K.

After using the conventional format of movies, news, and sports for its first four years on the air, the network made a substantial turn towards business news in March 2010.

With headquarters located in the Belgrade municipality of Savski Venac, TV Avala broadcasts 24 hours a day.

== Overview ==
One of the first shows broadcast on TV Avala was Star Trek: Enterprise, the first time in almost fifteen years one of the Star Trek series to be broadcast legally in Serbia. Due to this Serbian Trekkies have strongly sported this television, making a fan-site and a forum even before official site was online. Enterprise had medium ratings and public hoped that older shows of franchise will be shown. After Enterprise ended its run, there was annunciations for other Star Trek shows, but have yet to be seen.

== Ownership ==
TV Avala's ownership structure includes 4 subjects (2 individuals and 2 companies).

The majority stake in TV Avala is held by businessman Danko Đunić (51%). In March 2008, a 4.95% stake in the television was bought by Željko Mitrović, owner of competing station RTV Pink.

For the next several years TV Avala's ownership structure includes 9 subjects (2 individuals and 7 companies): Đunić and Mitrović as well as Tehnoprogres d.o.o. (30.68%), Media Plus d.o.o. (14.94%), Ekonomski institut a.d. (0.99%), Tuck Vision d.o.o. (0.94%), Dexin Film d.o.o. (0.94%), ITM Group d.o.o. (0.47%), Metalac a.d. (0.47%).

In October 2008, Germany's RTL Group was given a green light to buy 49% of TV Avala for €45 million, but ultimately decided against the acquisition.

Sometime in 2010, Austrian-registered company Greenberg Invest GmbH (listed as owned by Austrian lawyer Johannes Werner Krauß) bought shares in TV Avala owned by Tehnoprogres d.o.o. (30.68%), Media Plus d.o.o. (14.94%), Tuck Vision d.o.o. (0.94%), Dexin Film d.o.o. (0.94%), ITM Group d.o.o. (0.47%), and Metalac a.d. (0.47%), totalling 48.44%.

In mid-October 2012, after two months of negotiations, Saša Popović, the owner of Grand Production, and Željko Mitrović agreed to purchase the controlling stake in TV Avala. At the same time, it was announced that the network will change its name to Narodna TV starting from January 7, 2013. However, from November 4, 2012, at 8 am, the station started broadcasting as Pink2.

== Personnel ==
From its inception in 2006, TV Avala’s editor‑in‑chief was Srđan Đurić, who had previously served as the adviser for media to then prime minister Vojislav Koštunica.

On November 14, 2008, it was announced that editor-in-chief Srđan Đurić had left the network. On December 26, 2008, it was announced that Aleksandra Radujko (former anchorwoman on TV Pink and wife of high-ranking Democratic Party official and Telekom Srbija CEO Branko Radujko) was to take over as the new editor-in-chief.

In March 2010, TV Avala's managing board named Željko Mitrović as the 'special advisor to the operational management' in essence giving him a free rein of the network's personnel affairs. His first move was letting Aleksandra Radujko go and naming Robert Nemeček as the new editor-in-chief. Mitrović also initiated a substantial format makeover for the network.

In October 2010, TV veteran Bojana Lekić was brought in as the station's general manager, marking her return to television after four years since the demise of BKTV where she was the editor-in-chief. The original idea at TV Avala was for Lekić to work alongside Nemeček. However, one month later in November, Nemeček was relieved of his editor-in-chief duties by the managing board and replaced with Lekić, initially in the temporary caretaker role until permanent person is hired.

Lekić, who continued performing editorial duties in temporary role for over a year, left in January 2012 amid turmoil in the middle of the strike at the station. She was replaced with the station's managing board member Dušan Pančić who thus became the new editor-in-chief.

== Viewership and finances ==
According to AGB Nielsen Media Research for the year 2007, TV Avala ranked sixth place for overall view, ranked amidst all the Serbian channels with national coverage. (3.6% TV market share and 2.2 million average daily viewers tuning in for at least one minute) behind RTS 1, Pink, B92, RTS 2, and Fox televizija. According to its calendar year 2007 annual financial report submitted to Serbian Economic Register Agency, the company had 172 employees and it posted a loss of RSD602,358,000 (approximately €7.5 million at the time with €1=RSD80).

In the 2008 annual report, the company reported 160 employees and a loss of RSD499,176,000 (approximately €5.5 million at the time with €1=RSD90).

== TV rights ==
SPORTS:

- Serie A
- Copa Libertadores

=== Previously aired telenovelas ===
Original name	Serbian translation	Origin
Las Aparicio	Udovice	Mexico
Ljubav u zaleđu	Ljubav u zaleđu	Croatia
Obični ljudi	Obični ljudi	Croatia
Las Tontas No Van al Cielo	Kandi	Mexico
Los Plateados	Osveta	Mexico, United States
SMS – sin miedo a soñar	SMS – сањај без страха	Spain
Amores de Mercado	Ljubav na prodaju	Colombia, United States
Sin vergüenza	Život bez stida	Colombia, United States
