= Baka Prase =

Serbian gamer, actor and entertainer (born 1996)

- Бака Прасе
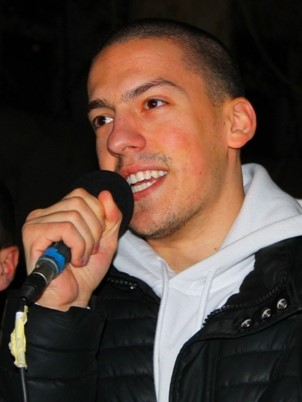
- Prase in 2018
- Born: Bogdan Ilić; September 16, 1996 (age 30); Vranje, Serbia, FR Yugoslavia
- Occupations: YouTuber; rapper; actor; gamer; entertainer; record producer

Kick information
- Channel: BakaPrase
- Years active: 2025–present
- Genre: Gambling
- Followers: 572.3K

YouTube information
- Channels: Baka Prase (terminated)
- Years active: 2016–2025
- Genres: Entertainment; comedy; gaming; music
- Subscribers: 2.57 million (February 18, 2025)
- Views: 1.4 billion (February 18, 2025)
- Musical career
- Genres: Serbian hip hop
- Years active: 2017–2021, 2022–
- Label: IDJDigital

Bogdan Ilić (Serbian Cyrillic: Богдан Илић; born September 16, 1996), better known as Baka Prase (Serbian Cyrillic: Бака Прасе, lit. 'Grandma Pig'), is a Serbian internet personality, streamer, entertainer and musician. He is a former professional League of Legends player, winning numerous local and regional championships.

He was also the founder of the Serbian brand known as ŠAIM SE which is currently closed. Ilić's YouTube channel name comes from the preschool cartoon Peppa Pig.

== Early life ==
Ilić was born on September 16, 1996, in Vranje, Serbia, FR Yugoslavia. His father Nenad Ilić is a priest, director, writer, and the Elder of the St. Nicholas Temple in Amsterdam. His mother Anastasija-Vesna Ilić is an actress and a writer. Prase is the third child, he has an older brother Pavle, older sister Jelisaveta and a younger sister Natalija. As a child, his father took him to church every Sunday morning until Prase became older and stopped wanting to go, which his father accepted. Prase completed elementary and secondary music school, but was rejected by the Musical Academy he was applying for. He worked as a storage worker before turning to YouTube.

== Career ==
Neither of Ilić's parents supported his work when he began to work on YouTube. He created his YouTube account in 2011 and uploaded his first video in 2016. Ilić started off playing League of Legends professionally for teams KlikTech and Fortuna. In 2015, he became the world champion in eSports within the Serbian gaming committee.

In 2018, Ilić released his debut studio album, Institucija. He also created his own gaming club and named it after the album. When the club opened over 500 teenagers and children came to it.

Ilić performed at the Balkan Tube Festival in Banja Luka in 2018 with other YouTube stars. In the same year, Ilić performed at the Nikola Pasić's ice skating park in Belgrade, with Neverne Bebe and Lena Kovačević. He also performed in Novi Sad in 2019, where too many children came to the event and the audience needed to be evacuated.

Ilić was invited to the FanPit Festival in Zagreb, Croatia, where he recorded a video with KSI. He starred in the 2019 movie Ideš? Idem! alongside other YouTube stars. Prase went to Kosovo with his father, where he performed on stage, and together they recorded videos about Serbian monasteries and spoke about their values. He also donated money to the Red Star Rowing Club for their trip to the 2020 European Rowing Championships.

Prase performed at the concert "Born in Ghetto", inside Mirza Delibašić Hall, located in Sarajevo, Bosnia and Herzegovina, along with Jala Brat, Buba Corelli, RAF Camora, Coby, Goga Sekulić, and others. He was also featured on Serbian television quiz show TV Slagalica in the Associations game as one of the answers; the final answer was "Pig", and the answer to the column B was "Grandma".

In 2020, Ilić returned to play in the Esports Balkan League with his own team named "Šaim se". He also began advertising his brand all over billboards in Belgrade. People believed that he planned to become a candidate for the 2020 Serbian parliamentary election. The singer and political advisor Nebojša Krstić said that Ilić could have had more votes than Serbian unions. However, comedian and political activist Ljubiša Preletačević denied these theories.

In December 2022, Ilić began his own Serbian fast food chain called "Kod Bake" (Serbian Cyrillic: Код Баке, lit. 'At Grandmas').

In September 2023, while filming a YouTube video, Ilić surprised Desingerica with a Rolex watch worth €15,000.

In December 2023, Ilić purchased a new Brabus G-Wagen, a luxury vehicle reportedly valued at approximately €500,000. He featured the acquisition in a YouTube video, showcasing his increasing wealth and significant purchases during that period.

In October 2024, Ilić hosted a live broadcast on his YouTube channel with Jelena Karleuša, where they raised nearly €15,000 for the flood victims in Bosnia and Herzegovina. The live broadcast had nearly 200,000 viewers. Ilić later donated an extra €10,000. The funds were donated to the humanitarian organization "Pomozi.ba" and the initiative received positive public reaction.

At the end of 2024, Ilić launched his snacks and energy drinks: Chips BAKA tebrasti, BAKA coko bananica and BAKA Ono moje (energy drink).

On July 9, 2025, Ilić met with IShowSpeed who was on his world tour. Ilić gave him a challenge to do a backflip of his Brabus G-Wagen. After Speed performed a backflip, Ilić gave him a €30,000 Rolex as a gift.

In September 2025, Ilić purchased a Mansory Porsche P9LM EVO 900, described as a unique 7/7 model with custom "BP" seat detailing. Media reports suggest Ilić's specific vehicle, including custom features and fees, had a final price near €700,000. At the end of November 2025, Ilić bought a Lamborghini Urus, valued at €400,000.

On November 29, 2025, Ilic appeared at Karađorđe Stadium to show support for FK Vojvodina during the match against FK Spartak Subotica. The match ended with a 2–0 victory for FK Vojvodina. Ilić was invited to FK Vojvodina's premises, where he had dinner and an interview for FK Vojvodina. On December 7, Ilić placed a €8,500 bet on FK Vojvodina during a match against FK Red Star. The match ended with a 1:0 victory for FK Vojvodina, which earned Ilić €60,000.

Ilić organized BFC 1 (Baka Fighting Championship), a combat sports event featuring matches between influencers, TikTokers, and professional fighters. It was held on February 1, 2026. The event was broadcast live on Kick.com and reportedly reached a peak viewership of 600,000 concurrent viewers.

Following the success of his combat sports event, Ilić launched a digital talent show titled Ja nemam talenat ("I Have No Talent") in May 2026. The entertainment show, which aired weekly on his Kick streaming channel, featured viral internet personalities, TikTokers, and eccentric contestants performing bizarre or comedic acts. Much like his previous projects, the talent show quickly generated massive engagement on social media platforms, drawing hundreds of thousands of concurrent viewers who tuned in to watch Ilić and guest judges critique the unorthodox performances of his fans. The show's finale was scheduled for the end of July, and the winner took home €50,000.

== Controversies ==
=== Events ===
In 2017, Ilić reacted to a video of a 12-year-old girl experiencing romance problems. This culminated in another YouTuber, known as Amir Hadžić, responding to the video. Hadžic criticized Ilić for mocking the girl, whom afterwards attempted suicide. In 2018, Ilić criticized a song created by YouTuber sisters "Andjela & Nadja". This escalated and led to Andjela and Nadja’s father responding to Ilić and criticizing him for being disrespectful towards his children.

In 2019, Ilić reacted to a diss-track about him from other Serbian YouTubers. This culminated in the release of several diss-tracks between Ilić and K1KA, another Serbian YouTuber and Twitch Streamer, both of whom ended up together on a morning television program. After K1KA committed suicide in December 2021, Ilić was brought in for questioning. Following the incident, Ilić moved to Amsterdam, Netherlands with his partner where he purchased a flat in order to join the rest of his family. Ilić had stated that he had made this decision following the outcry of the Serbian public on K1KA’s suicide. Ilić claimed that the situation had escalated to the point where he had received serious death threats. Ilić further announced that he will most likely cease streaming on YouTube, stating that it was too time-consuming and unprofitable.

In 2020, the Serbian singer Voyager said that Serbian YouTubers are not in the same rank as Serbian musicians. After this remark, Prase decided to create videos and a diss-track against Voyage's claims. During an interview in 2020, Jelena Karleuša admonished YouTubers (including Prase) for gaining fame undeservedly and shutting out "talented singers" from becoming famous. Prase and Karleuša exchanged response videos criticizing the other. Another Serbian folk singer, Aca Lukas, was asked in an interview what his opinion on Prase was and he criticized Prase, saying that he never heard of him or his work.

Croatian YouTube influencer Filip Rožman, better known as KakoLako, created a 37 minute long video called "Drama Salama - Baka Prase", in which he criticized Ilić on a wide variety of topics, including his music career and for being a hypocrite. Despite talking about it and partially addressing it, Baka Prase did not want to name the video directly outside one of his streams, possibly not wanting to risk exposing his fans to actual criticism of him. Serbian actor and politician Sergej Trifunović also criticized Ilić, responding to Twitter posts by Ilić.

Ilić criticized English singers Dua Lipa and Rita Ora, both ethnic Kosovo Albanians, for Instagram posts regarding Kosovo being independent.

In September 2022, Ilić had a long-stretched controversy with Serbian entrepreneur, CEO and founder of the Pink Media Group, Željko Mitrović, both of whom have released diss-tracks against each other. Mitrović has also made a documentary film about Ilić. The controversy escalated in Ilić's primary and secondary YouTube channels being terminated from YouTube. Multiple theories were made, one of them inciting that the whole 'drama' was a publicity stunt to boost both Mitrović's and Ilić's popularity in their respective industries.

In January 2023, Ilić's restaurant caught on fire by a pedestrian that threw a molotov cocktail.

In late January 2024, the franchise 'Kod Bake' was shut down in major cities. This was suspected to be a result of Ilić not paying enough money to his franchiser, who was allegedly an anonymous Chinese businessman.

In July 2024, Ilić reported that someone robbed his apartment on the island of Pag, Croatia. The damage was estimated at around €250,000. According to his social media posts, expensive watches (notably Rolexes), money, and other personal items were stolen while he was away filming a song with Voyage. Ilić offered a €25,000 reward for information about the perpetrators. This led to the perpetrators being arrested and Ilić‘s stolen goods being returned to him. Ilić also praised the swift response by the Croatian police.

On February 18, 2025, Ilić's main and second channel was terminated from YouTube. Following the termination, he stated that he had never felt worse, posting an image of himself on the floor with the message, "They took everything from me, they are shutting down my businesses, channels, they're just bringing me down. I don't know what I'll do, I swear, I've never been worse." However, he soon returned by opening new channels and continuing live streams on other platforms.

In mid September 2025, Ilić raised suspicions and accusations on one of his live streams that Luka Bojović, better known as Lux, was faking certain aspects of his life. This sparked a public conflict. During their public drama, Ilić made allegations and alleged evidence, including correspondence, that suggested the winners of Luka Bojović's giveaways were prearranged or rigged. It escalated to the point where Luka Bojović made serious allegations, stating that if anything happened, Ilić would be to blame. At the end of September, Luka Bojović made a public apology to Ilić and admitted that some of Ilić's statements were true.

On the night of February 15, 2026, Ilić's Brabus G-Wagen was set on fire in front of his apartment. The front and interior of the vehicle were completely destroyed. Afterwards, the police arrived and conducted an on-site investigation. Dozens of curious onlookers gathered where the police warned them not to approach. The Serbian police launched a search for the perpetrator. On February 18, the person who set fire to the car was identified and arrested.

=== Allegations of child grooming ===
On July 4, 2020, Ilić was accused of child grooming. Ilić responded to this accusation explaining that he had sexual intercourse with a 16-year-old girl who told him that she was 18. Another girl started making TikTok and Twitter posts exposing that Ilić supposedly engaged in sexual explicit chats with minors. Ilić responded by saying that most of the minors in question either faked or never told their ages and that one of the chats was fabricated. Ilić further stating that he is planning to file a criminal complaint over the false claim. Because of the claims, Ilić's sponsors dropped him. The allegations motivated Ilić to make a music video for the song "Lična", which was age-restricted and taken down from the Serbian YouTube trending list for being too explicit. On Twitter, a video appeared of Ilić supposedly possessing cocaine during the creation of the music video, to which Ilić responded that it was just rice. The cocaine allegations escalated in Ilić making a YouTube video, defending himself regarding the rumors. Because of the allegations, Ilić revealed that he would take a break from YouTube.

== Personal life ==
Ilić made numerous videos on YouTube, claiming that he was in love with Serbian singer Sara Jo. The pair met once in Belgrade where Ilić asked Sara Jo out and she declined. In an interview, Sara Jo was asked about Ilić. She said that her song "Nemam vremena za to" (transl. I Don't Have Time For That) fits her opinion on Ilić. This motivated Ilić to create a song dedicated to her known as "Imam vremena za to" (transl. I Do Have Time For That). In 2020, Ilić stopped regularly uploading videos to his YouTube channel, revealing on his Instagram account that he was undergoing tonsillectomy on February 20, 2020. Ilić was in an open-relationship with another Serbian YouTube influencer and internet personality known as Anja Bla, after they have broken up in January 2022. The couple got back together in 2023 and have been together until July 2024, when the couple officially separated. Since May 2025, it has been confirmed that Ilić got a new girlfriend, El Milena. The couple officially separated in August 2026.

== Filmography ==
=== Film ===
Title	Year	Role	Notes	Ref.
Ideš? Idem!	2019	Himself	Lead role	

== Discography ==
=== Albums ===
- Institucija (2018)

No.	Title	Writer(s)	Producer(s)	Length
1.	"Balkanska Scena" (featuring Lazić)	Baka Prase & Lazić	Perke	3:55
2.	"Bleja u Turskoj"	Baka Prase	Stefan Jacks	2:43
3.	"Džumandži"	Baka Prase	Parris Gram	2:56
4.	"Kolko Si Jadan"	Baka Prase	Stefan Jacks	2:30
5.	"Gradski Prevoz" (Najbolji Ortaci featuring Baka Prase)	Najbolji Ortaci & Baka Prase	Stefan Jacks	2:28
6.	"Teretana"	Baka Prase	Stefan Jacks	2:32
7.	"Malo Pažnje"	Baka Prase	Stefan Jacks	1:50
8.	"YouTube Sudbina" (featuring Stefan Jacks & Petra P)	Baka Prase, Stefan Jacks & Petra P	Stefan Jacks	2:30
9.	"Prvi Seks"	Baka Prase	Baka Prase	2:30
Total length:				23:55

=== Singles ===
==== 2018 ====
- "Hej Hej!"
- "Šaim Se"
- "Pariz"
- "Balkanska Scena" (with Goranka Lazić)
- "Godina"
- "Autotune"
- ''Bleja u Turskoj''
- "Hasl" (with Choda)

==== 2019 ====
- "Paketići" (with Choda)
- "Balkanska Scena 2" (with Goranka Lazić)
- "Drug"
- "Ono Moje"
- "Poni"
- "Vesti"
- "Imam Vremena Za To"
- "Jel Te Nije Blam"

==== 2020 ====
- "Blamage"
- "Korona"
- "Sve Vas Volim"
- "Macan"
- "Lična"
- "Ona Ona"
- "Dubai"

==== 2021 ====
- "Zovi Tatu"
- "Obi"

==== 2022 ====
- "Tokyo"
- "MPQRC"

==== 2023 ====
- "Južni Vetar"

==== 2024 ====
- "VVS" (with Voyage)

==== 2026 ====
- "Betmen" (with Choda)
- "Alo Mala" (with Mihajlo Madić)

== Awards and nominations ==
Year	Award	Category	Recipient(s)	Result	Ref.
2020	2020 Music Awards Ceremony	Hip-Hop/Rap Song of the Year	Himself	Nominated	
