= Gordana Suša =

Serbian journalist (1946–2021)

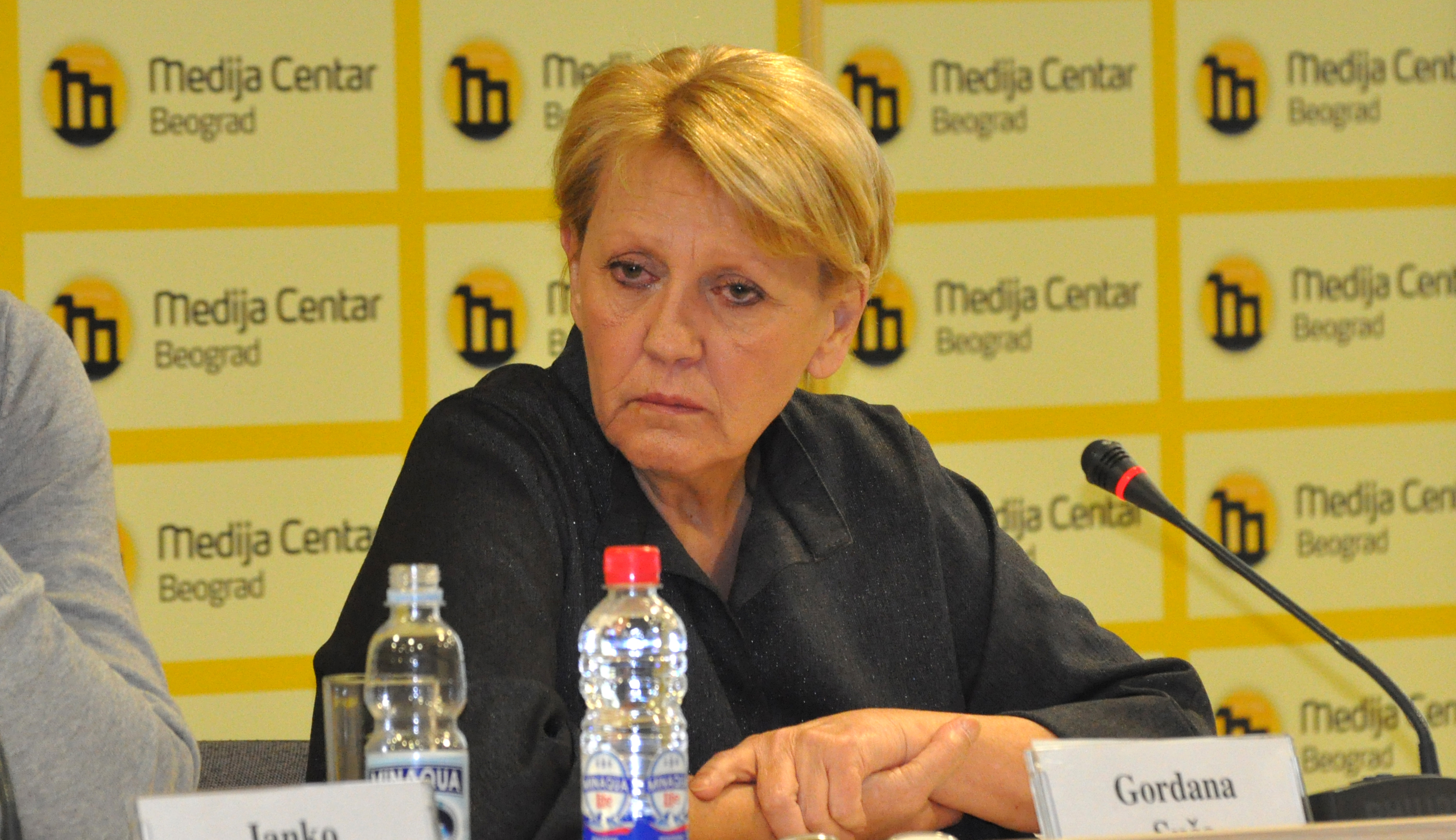
- Suša in April 2017
- Born: Gordana Mihailović; 2 February 1946; Belgrade, PR Serbia, Yugoslavia
- Died: 22 June 2021 (aged 75); Belgrade, Serbia
- Occupations: Journalist; President of NUNS (1999–2001)

Gordana Suša (2 February 1946 – 22 June 2021) was a Serbian journalist. She wrote a weekly Saturday column for the daily Blic and from 2010 until her death sat on the board of the Serbian Broadcasting Agency (RRA), the country's electronic media regulatory body.

== Early life and education ==
Born in Belgrade to a writer and journalist father Živorad "Šilja" Mihailović (1920-2003) from Kruševac and Yugoslav Constitutional Court judge and Federal Executive Council (SIV) member mother Radojka Katić (1922–?) from Solin, young Gordana spent part of her childhood in Zagreb and Solin.

Upon moving back to Belgrade, she completed the Fifth Belgrade Gymnasium before enrolling in and graduating from the journalism program at the University of Belgrade's Faculty of Political Sciences.

== Journalism career ==
=== Radio-Television Belgrade ===
Simultaneous to her university studies, Suša worked as contractor at Radio Belgrade's Channel Two, hosting a daily arts programme Ko se duri u kulturi.

In 1971, she got hired full-time at Radio Belgrade's news division. Starting out as a reporter, she moved up to a commentator position and eventually became an editor.

After almost a decade in radio, in 1978, she moved to television, getting a job at TV Belgrade's news division. Over the following thirteen years Suša became one of RTB's more recognizable personalities, covering Yugoslav federal politics, editing the 7:30pm central daily newscast Dnevnik 2 as well as anchoring it as main anchor Goran Milić's backup, and appearing on the weekly political magazine ZiP.

With SFR Yugoslavia's disintegration in full swing along the lines of its six constituent republics, and all the ways that process affected the country's state-owned media outlets, Suša quit her RTB job in May 1991, unhappy with the network's editorial shift under CEO Dušan Mitević towards uncritical support of the SR Serbia president Slobodan Milošević and his ruling Socialist party.

=== Yutel ===
Immediately upon leaving RTB, Suša joined the upstart Yutel, a nightly television newscast financially backed by the Federal Executive Council (SIV) under the presidency of Ante Marković. For the job, she moved to Sarajevo where Yutel was being produced. At the time of her coming on board, Yutel had been on the air for some eight months already with Goran Milić, another popular former RTB personality, as the face of the project as well as its editor-in-chief. Other journalists involved with Yutel included Zekerijah "Zeka" Smajić, Dževad Sabljaković, Velibor Čović, Ivica Puljić, Aleksandar Saša Mlač, etc.

With the security situation in SFR Yugoslavia deteriorating rapidly, Yutel reported from the scene about the Borovo Selo incident in early May, the Split protest several days later, and the Ten-Day War in SR Slovenia in late June and early July 1991 as well as the Dalj massacre later in the summer. It didn't take long for the differences of opinion among the ethnically diverse members of the Yutel newsroom to arise over the angle, tone, and context of various reports being produced and disseminated by the newscast on the nature and circumstances of the unfolding violent events. Suša saw what she considered editor-in-chief Milić's initial "symmetrical" approach when it came to covering the events, that is presenting both sides of the dispute, gradually give way to tilting the coverage in favour of the Croatian cause. In addition to concerns over editorial balance, Suša further voiced her displeasure over certain Yutel editors and reporters "abandoning professional standards", giving up on neutrality and becoming openly biased. She singled out Milić's deputy Jela Jevremović in this regard, considering her conduct towards Bosnian Serb and Yugoslav People's Army (JNA) leaders at press conferences in Sarajevo to be "rude and uncivilized".

=== Borba ===
After Yutel stopped broadcasting as Sarajevo got plunged into escalating Bosnian War Suša was without a job for six months. In late 1992, she joined Borba, a government-owned daily that nevertheless managed to maintain a degree of independence under editor-in-chief Manjo Vukotić.

In 1993, she also started a production company called ViN (Video nedeljnik) that produced a weekly television current events magazine of the same name. Not tied to a specific broadcaster, the magazine aired on different stations over the years, including BKTV, TV Pink, and B92.

=== Naša borba ===
As the Serbian government stripped Borba of all its editorial independence, most of the staff started their own newspaper named Naša borba. Suša joined the group and wrote for the paper until government effectively shut it down in October 1998 by leveling a draconian fine under the controversial information law.

In December 1999, Suša got elected president of the Independent Serbian Journalists' Association (NUNS).

=== ViN and Press pretres ===
In hours following 5 October 2000 overthrow of Slobodan Milošević in Serbia, Suša was briefly put in charge of editing the RTS broadcasts and was throughout 2001 in the running for top editorial positions at the network, but nothing came of it on this occasion.

She continued with her own television production, putting out weekly television magazine ViN as well as Press pretres, a political talk show. On 18 April 2003, in the wake of the assassination of Serbian prime minister Zoran Đinđić, Suša revealed that, following her interview with the interior minister Dušan Mihajlović on Press pretres, she received a phone call from the Serbian government media bureau chief Vladimir "Beba" Popović during which he launched into an obscenity laced tirade of threats and insults towards her, dissatisfied over the questions she had posed to Mihajlović.

=== Brief return to RTS ===
In early May 2004, Suša got named the head of Radio Television of Serbia's (RTS) news division, a post to which she got appointed by the recently named general-director Aleksandar Tijanić. The appointment marked her return to the state broadcaster after 13 years.

In mid November 2004, only six months after being appointed, Suša resigned from RTS.

=== Blic ===
In early 2011, Suša was hired to write a weekly column in the Blic daily owned by Ringier Axel Springer.

The column ended in October 2012.

== Death ==
On June 22, 2021, Gordana Suša died in Belgrade at the age of 75 after a long illness.
