= RTS 3 (1989–2006) =

RTS 3K
- Country: Serbia
- Headquarters: Belgrade

Ownership
- Owner: Radio Television of Serbia
- Sister channels: RTS 1 RTS 2

History
- Launched: 9 May 1989; 37 years ago
- Closed: 5 May 2006; 20 years ago
- Replaced by: TV Avala
- Former names: Festovizija (1989); Omladinski Kanal (OK) (1989); 3K (1989–1996, 2000–2001, 2003–2006); RTS 3 (1995–1996, 2001–2003)

Availability

Terrestrial
- Analog: Channel 30

RTS Third Channel was a Serbian television channel that was part of Radio Television of Serbia (RTS). It was created on 1 July 1989 and closed on 5 May 2006. The channel was originally dedicated to youth culture and, however, became the main film, alternative series and sports channel in the late 1990s and the early 2000s.

== History ==
=== Festovizija ===
Originally, on 26 January 1989, with the beginning of the FEST film festival, a temporary nine-day television channel was broadcast. The channel aimed to present the events at the festival that took place in the Sava Center in Belgrade. Interviews, guests, reviews, three feature films a day from previous festivals, premiere television films were aired. The editor of this temporary channel was Nebojša Đukelić.

During the duration of the JU Video Show from 5 to 11 February 1989, another temporary channel was broadcast in the Dom omladine, the editor of this program was Radoslav Zelenović. Programming consisted of a selection of good films, satellite and video programs. In the absence of its own material, the channel was helped by video clubs that provided their materials. Aired at the time of the YU Video Show, it was supplemented by live editions of the radio shows Index 202 and Rhythm of the Heart. PGP RTB (now PGP RTS) ceded Disney films and tapes from its production.

=== OK channel ===
With the signing of the contract on 23 May 1989 between the Working Organization of TV Belgrade, on the one hand, and Dom omladine and the City Conference of the Association of Socialist Youth of Belgrade, on the other hand, an agreement was reached on joint realization, broadcasting of programs on the third experimental channel, produced by Dom omladine.

The contract was signed by Nenad Ristić, director of Television Belgrade and Branko Gligorić, director of Dom omladine. The contract specified, among other things, the time of broadcasting the program from 22 May to 19 June 1989, in the period from 12:00 to 24:00. The contract also defined that the founder of the television was the City Conference of SSO, and the producer of the Dom omladine program. Technical services were provided by the company Artline (original name Artline) from Subotica, and the link and transmission connections were provided by Television Belgrade.

The channel was named OK channel (Youth channel), and it was planned as part of the overall Youth Day celebration project. The chief editor of the channel was Radoman Kanjevac.

It was conceived as an alternative, unconventional channel that stirred the public with its provocative content, primarily contact shows about politics and erotica. Journalist Milorad Vučelić in the show Strictly Confidential conducted conversations with guests who had different views on the events of the fifties and sixties than the official ones, and Nebojša Glišić, while showing inserts from soft and hard porn films, brought provocative guests and spontaneous, cheeky and often spoke profanely to viewers about erotica".

In June 1989, the day before the contract expired, the work of "OK Channel" was temporarily terminated. Since TVB announced the opening of the program on its Third Channel officially on 1 September, under pressure from the public, the work of "OK Channel" continued after a few days, but now exclusively within Television Belgrade, from the premises of Dom pionir at Takovska 8, from where it is. On 1 May 1990 he was moved to the center of Sava.

=== Third Channel ===
The third channel within Radio-television Belgrade (later RTS), which initially bore the name OK channel, began broadcasting on 1 July 1989.

During the 1990s and the beginning of the 2000s, the Third Channel went through several phases: the concept was visually and programmatically changed, in certain periods the program was the most watched but also very poorly followed. Program 3K is marked by commercial films and series (since the mid-nineties and regularly updated Latin soap operas), shows for children (On the other side of the rainbow), about film (World of Film; various chronicles of Fest and other film festivals), from the world of music, sports and sports broadcasts, art. News on 3K was broadcast sporadically - during the biggest crises, but they, as well as the related Weather Forecast, had the character of the Third Channel - with young presenters, "different" primetime and with minimal minutes; the biggest "ally" of 3K was MTV, which was constantly present on small screens - this is something that Channel Three, which was then known for songs from the eighties, is remembered by many young viewers at the time.

By broadcasting Divlja Ruža and Cassandra, the Third Channel was the first to popularize Latin American telenovelas.

By broadcasting the show ZAM, the Third Channel played a large part in the popularization of turbo-folk music in the early nineties of the 20th century. Broadcasting of the American NFL league significantly popularized American football in Serbia in the early 2000s.

In October 2003, the Third Channel and Radio 101 withdrew from the RTS system due to the announced and planned sale. Since the sale did not take place, on 9 October 2004 the Third Channel and Radio 101 were returned to RTS.

How, after the adoption of the new Law on Radio Broadcasting, RTS could not have three channels, in addition to the attempt to sell the Third Channel and the insistence of the editor-in-chief Igor Miklja on this, during the works on Mita Ružića Street (from Kralja Aleksandra Boulevard to Matica Street Serbian when lines 20 and 46 changed routes) the channel had to be shut down. The broadcast of the program was interrupted on 5 May 2006. On 17 September 2006 the Third Channel was replaced by Avala television, which received a license to broadcast programs on that frequency at the competition of the Republic Broadcasting Agency for the national frequency.

== See also ==
- RTS 1
- RTS 2
- RTS 3, current version of third channel of RTS
- Radio Television of Serbia
