= Concert Yutel for Peace =

1991 concert in Bosnia and Herzegovina

YUTEL for Peace (Serbo-Croatian: YUTEL za mir) was an anti-war concert organized by the independent Yugoslav National Broadcasting Agency Yutel, held at the Zetra Arena in Sarajevo on Sunday, 28 July 1991 as a protest against the war in Yugoslavia. The following artists played at the concert: Rade Šerbedžija, Bajaga i Instruktori, Crvena Jabuka, Goran Bregović, Haris Džinović, EKV, Dino Merlin, Indexi, Regina, Nele Karajlić, Plavi Orkestar and others.

The Concert was originally planned outdoors at the plateau in front of the Holiday Inn hotel, but was subsequently moved to the Zetra arena because of bad weather conditions. The concert was attended by over thirty thousand spectators, with another fifty thousand left outside of the sold-out venue. The program was hosted by YUTEL news anchors Goran Milić and Gordana Suša. The broadcast was aired in SR Bosnia-Herzegovina, SR Macedonia and SR Serbia (on NTV Studio B). Other four channels of the Yugoslav national public broadcasting system (JRT) refused to carry it.

== See also ==
- 1992 anti-war protests in Sarajevo
- 1991–1992 anti-war protests in Belgrade
