= Goran Milić =

Croatian journalist (born 1946)

- Born: 24 January 1946 (age 80); Zagreb, PR Croatia, SFR Yugoslavia
- Occupations: Journalist; television personality; television news executive
- Years active: 1970–present

Goran Milić (born 24 January 1946) is a Croatian and Bosnian journalist and television personality. Over his career spanning forty years, he became a prominent media personality in the countries of former Yugoslavia.

From 2011 to 2016, Milić was the Al Jazeera Balkans news and program director.

== Early life and education ==
Born in Zagreb, PR Croatia, FPR Yugoslavia to Marko Milić from Slano and Marija Smodlaka from Dubrovnik), young Goran spent a couple of months in Prague at the age of six, joining his father who was part of the Yugoslav diplomatic staff in Czechoslovakia. In 1954, his father got reassigned to an observer post in the Council of Europe so the family moved to Strasbourg where young Goran attended primary school, grades two through six. Milić's father was an active participant and supporter of Croatian Spring.

In 1959, his father got a job at the Yugoslav Ministry of Foreign Affairs, which for 13-year-old Milić meant relocation to Yugoslav capital Belgrade where he soon commenced his gymnasium studies. Before graduating gymnasium, however, he was on the move again, this time to Montevideo, Uruguay as his father got named to the post of Yugoslavia's ambassador in the South American country. Milić returned to Belgrade to graduate gymnasium, and then went back to Uruguay before returning to Belgrade once more to enroll at the University of Belgrade's Faculty of Law.

In 1969, going away to Titograd for his mandatory Yugoslav People's Army (JNA) stint, Milić served as a traffic officer. After that, Milić relocated to London, where he worked as a truck driver in Nottingham Hill. After a stint in England, Milić tried to apply for job in Belgrade once again, though he rather wished to pursue a career in maritime law.

== Journalism career ==
=== Radiotelevizija Beograd (RTB) ===
In 1970, twenty-four-year-old Milić began his journalism career at the state-run Radio-Television Belgrade (RTB). Initially, the youngster learned the ropes under seasoned journalists Ranko Lozo, Nebojša Popović, and Velimir Popović. Milić also cites Momčilo Popović as an influence, specifically his style of summarizing news items in a catchy headline before expanding upon the topic. His first job consisted of travelling around Serbia and collecting feedback about the television programme. However, the project was shortly abandoned.

==== Foreign reporter ====
RTB eventually assigned Milić to cover foreign politics (initially assigned to Latin America section) where his knowledge of languages came in handy. His first foreign assignment was reporting from the Arab League summit in Algiers in late November 1973. A year later, he reported from the scene in Cyprus in July 1974 during the Turkish invasion where he went after interviewing Greek foreign minister Georgios Mavros. In 1975, during the conference of Non-Aligned Movement in Peru, Milić witnessed a coup d'état executed by Francisco Morales-Bermúdez.

Milić soon advanced to the position of editor in the foreign affairs department and was among the Yugoslav press pack following president Tito on his foreign trips to Panama, Venezuela, Mexico, Berlin, as well as the United States in 1978.

==== Correspondent from New York City ====
In late 1979 Milić was named RTB's correspondent from New York City, moving there in April 1980 with his wife Olivera. Only a month after Milić's arrival to the United States, Yugoslav president Tito died. During the mourning period back home, Milić managed to interview the U.S. president Jimmy Carter. Milić later revealed the diplomatic maneuvering behind the interview:

Yeah, that interview was actually Carter's conciliatory offering to the people of Yugoslavia after his decision not to come to Tito's funeral where he sent his mother instead. No one in the US administration would admit it publicly, but it was clear Carter didn't want to be present and photographed at the same function with Soviet General Secretary Leonid Brezhnev in the middle of their frosty relations and disagreements over Afghanistan. So, now he wanted to make amends with the people of Yugoslavia by addressing them directly and his staffers were offering him to me and Politika's correspondent Jurij Gustinčič. However, the Yugoslav public considered Carter's skipping of Tito's funeral to be very disrespectful and even my editor-in-chief back in Belgrade, Dušan Mitević, told me not to do the interview due to Yugoslav powers that be not being keen on putting Carter on our airwaves at this particular time. I on the other hand worried about my future access to the U.S. administration figures, figuring 'if I turn down the U.S. president right now, what am I gonna do here in New York for the next five years' and Mitević gave me some freedom for the final decision. I finally even went to Budimir Lončar, Yugoslav ambassador in the US, asking him what to do, and he told me to do the interview, but also not to tell anyone he gave me the go-ahead to do it.

Milić returned from New York in 1985. During his time in the United States, Milić became a member of National Academy of Television Arts and Sciences, and was a part of the committee for News & Documentary Emmy Award for three years. Coming back home to Yugoslavia, simultaneously with work at RTB, he began teaching at the University of Belgrade's Department of Journalism as lecturer, a job he performed until 1988.

==== Dnevnik 2 news anchor ====
Right after returning from New York, Milić began hosting Saturday's Dnevnik 2, RTB's 7:30pm central daily newscast, which made him a well-known television personality all over SR Serbia and SFR Yugoslavia. He was simultaneously promotion to an executive position, being appointed as RTB news division's deputy editor-in-chief.

At Dnevnik 2, in addition to delivering the news, his Saturday newscasts also bore somewhat of a personal imprint with several thematic segments including one where he got to interview general interest guests. One of the most enduring moments of his time hosting Dnevnik was a live link into a 1987 Bijelo Dugme concert at Belgrade's Sajam, allowing the band to perform their "Pljuni i zapjevaj moja Jugoslavijo" song live for the large television audience.

In 1989, he covered the Kosovo miners' strike.

===== Side PR jobs =====
Throughout Milić's time anchoring RTB's Dnevnik 2, his popularity and prominence got him various one-off high profile side jobs in public relations.

In fall 1985, upon returning from America, he got appointed to the executive committee of the city of Belgrade's bid to host the 1992 Summer Olympics. His work at the committee from late 1985 and throughout 1986 mostly entailed dealing with the bid's media presentation and publicity in foreign press and electronic media. In October 1986, at the IOC vote, Barcelona won ahead of Paris and Brisbane, with Belgrade coming in fourth out of the six bids.

In 1987, communist politician Josip Vrhovec appointed Milić the president of the information commission for the Universiade in Zagreb.

In September 1989, Milić became spokesman for the Non-Aligned Movement's 9th summit in Belgrade.

In July 1990, Milić reportedly received a personal offer from Franjo Tuđman, the president of SR Croatia, to transfer to Croatian Radiotelevision (HRT). At the hour-long meeting, Tuđman wanted Milić to run the news division at HRT, a network undergoing major organizational and conceptual changes including name change from Radiotelevizija Zagreb (RTZ), but Milić turned down the offer.

=== Yutel ===
In October 1990, Milić became host and editor-in-chief of the newly established Yutel, Sarajevo-based daily newscast founded and financed by the Federal Executive Council (SIV) under the presidency of Ante Marković. Milić hosted the very first Yutel newscast on Tuesday, 23 October 1990 at 10pm, opening with "Good evening, Yugoslavia", which would soon become something of a signature for him. Alongside Milić, other journalists producing the hour-long Yutel daily newscasts were Gordana Suša, Dževad Sabljaković, Velibor Čović, and Zekerijah Smajić.

In July 1991, along with other Yutel personalities, Milić emceed the Yutel for Peace concert.

=== Working for the Republic of Bosnia and Herzegovina government at the start of Bosnian War ===
After the May 1992 dissolution of Yutel that took place a few weeks following the start of the Bosnian War, Milić remained in Sarajevo, being employed by the government of Republic of Bosnia and Herzegovina, one of the warring sides in the conflict. In addition to filing news reports for the government-run television BHTV, he also ran the international press center under the government auspices. During that time, Milić hosted New York Times journalist John Fisher Burns, whose reporting about the Siege of Sarajevo earned him a Pulitzer Prize. During that time, Milić faced serious difficulties, as Republika Srpska's Minister of Justice Momčilo Mandić proclaimed Milić as a war criminal because of his "Goebbels-esque propaganda against Serbian people".

In July 1992, he was the head of the Bosnia and Herzegovina delegation at the 1992 Summer Olympics in Barcelona. The engagement provided him with an opportunity to leave war-ravaged Sarajevo and once the Olympics ended, he left for Zagreb, returning to the besieged city once again in 1994 for three months.

=== 1992–1997 ===
Arriving to the newly independent Croatia under president Franjo Tuđman and his ruling right-wing nationalist Croatian Democratic Union (HDZ) party, Milić became conspicuously absent from the most prominent Croatian media outlets despite a wealth of experience and a famous name in journalism. In later interviews the journalist admitted to having an "anathema above my head in Croatia" and being blacklisted in the country's top outlets due to his prior association with Yutel and pro-Yugoslav political views.

Milić was thus relegated to a series of lower profile jobs such as local TV productions in Umag as well as an 18-month columnist stint in Slovenian newsmagazine Mladina followed by writing for Marinko Božić's controversial right-wing weekly newspaper Slobodni tjednik. Milić later revealed that during this time he turned down an offer from Soros Foundation due to "being well aware of what they're all about".

In early 1993 Milić wrote an accusatory open letter directed at Serbian journalists, his former colleagues, and Serbian society as a whole. In the letter Milić talked of his "illusions about the Belgrade democrats all of whom had the Greater Serbia idea in their heads" and dismissed the country's movement opposing Slobodan Milošević as "nothing but cackling and lighting candles". Serbian media largely ignored the open letter, except for newsmagazine Vreme that published it in full along with a rebuke by their journalist Stojan Cerović who took issue with a number of views Milić expressed in the letter.

In 1996 Milić was involved in consulting capacity in the OHR's and EU's creation of Televizija OBN in Bosnia and Herzegovina.

Milić's unofficial ban in Croatia reportedly began to thaw in late 1996 when he was invited to a state-organized Christmas dinner, along with some other prominent individuals in Croatia known or perceived to hold unpopular political views such as Igor Mandić, where the Croatian president Franjo Tuđman made a point of being seen and photographed with Milić. Within months, Milić got hired at Croatian Radio Television (HRT), the state-run broadcaster.

=== Hrvatska radiotelevizija (HRT) ===
In 1997 Milić started at the state-run Croatian Radio Television (HRT) as a contractor.

In 2002 he got his own show on HRT called Brisani prostor.

From 2004 he worked as host and editor of the Sunday edition of Dnevnik, HRT's daily newscast. He has attracted attention for his travelogues from Europe, Russia, North America, Asia, Australia and South America. He is a speaker of multiple languages including English, French, Spanish, Italian, Portuguese and Russian. He was named Best Journalist in Croatia in 2007.

He retired from HRT in early 2011, signing off his last Dnevnik on 23 January 2011.

=== 2011–present ===
Between 2020 and 2021, Milić was diagnosed with COVID-19, for which he was successfully treated in Dubrovnik. During 2020, Milić created 20 reportages for HRT's travel show, Destination Croatia. Two years later, Milić was the producer of a documentary What's up Paris, London, Berlin. The 8-part documentary features Milić exploring the life of European capitals after social and economical changes, such as Brexit, COVID-19 pandemic, and migrant crisis.

== Controversy ==
=== Alleged extortion attempt ===
In September 2003, Milić was accused by Formula One Management CEO Bernie Ecclestone of an extortion attempt: "That man, Goran Milić, rang me up several times over the last few months. He told me he wants to help me because things can go very badly for me, badly for me in Croatia, bad for my image. He didn't mention specific amounts, but it was obvious he's talking about money and absolutely obvious that it's extortion". In support of his claims Ecclestone showed two letters he received from Milić, dated March and June 2003, respectively. Reportedly, the financial compensation Milić was asking from Eccelstone had to do with HRT journalist Srebrenka Herold-Mijatović who on 20 July 2000 fell down a flight of stairs on Eccelstone's yacht named "Petara", being severely injured with a skull fracture. The yacht was docked in Bol on the island of Brač and Herold-Mijatović had reportedly been invited on board due to her husband Vlado Mijatović being friends with Ecclestone's then-wife Slavica Radić.

Ecclestone continued: "I told Milić if someone wants to sue us they're free to do so. He insisted that would be bad for my image, and that he doesn't want to destroy it. He said that Herold-Mijatović is unable to work and that someone should compensate her".

== Personal life ==
In 1977 Milić married Olivera Katanić, a fellow journalist and Radio-Television Belgrade (RTB) colleague. In 1980 when Milić became RTB's foreign correspondent from New York, the couple, along with Olivera's son Igor from her previous marriage, moved to the United States. In 1984 their daughter Lana Marija Milić was born. Katanić, already diagnosed with cancer since 1978, died in 1988.

In 1990, at a speaking engagement in Sarajevo, 42-year-old widower Milić met Ana Lončar, a Radio Sarajevo contract employee. The two soon began dating, initially long distance as Milić lived in Belgrade where he anchored RTB's Dnevnik. In late 1990, after Milić's new job at Yutel brought him to Sarajevo, the couple started living together, along with Milić's 6-year-old daughter Lana Marija whom he brought over from Belgrade. As the Bosnian War broke out during spring 1992, Ana right away fled to Zagreb with Milić's daughter Lana Marija, while Milić, who initially remained behind in Sarajevo where he began working for Alija Izetbegović's Bosnian government, joined them in Croatia within a few months. Later in 1992, Milić married Ana, and in 1993 they had a son Marko.

Milić was a close friend of Željko Malnar, who was married to Milić's cousin, Karmen.

On 2 June 2015, Milić received a citizenship of Bosnia and Herzegovina.
