= Pink 15 =

Former Macedonian private television channel

- Type: Television
- Country: Macedonia
- Availability: Macedonia
- Owner: Pink International Company
- Key people: Željko Mitrović (Owner)
- Launch date: 22 October 2010
- Dissolved: 11 May 2012
- Former names: K-15

Pink 15 (Macedonian: Телевизија Пинк 15) was a Macedonian private television channel owned by Željko Mitrović.

After buying Macedonian television channel K-15, Mitrović's Pink International Company re-branded it as Pink 15. Revealing its schedule will consist of 60% Macedonian language programming, Mitrović also announced plans of investing €5-8 million into the operation over the next eighteen months.

Barely a year and a half into its operation the channel ran into financial problems. After not meeting its broadcasting license payments, Pink 15 had its license revoked by the Macedonian Broadcasting Agency. The channel was dissolved on 11 May 2012.
