= Elita (TV series) =

Serbian reality television series

- Logo for season 7
- Genre: Reality TV series
- Created by: Željko Mitrović
- Presented by: Dušica Jakovljević (2017–present); Ivana Šopić (2021–present); Darko Tanasijević (2018–present); Ognjen Amidžić (2017–present); Ognjen Nestorović (2018); Tamara Đurić (2019); Milan Milošević (2018–present)
- Country of origin: Serbia
- Original language: Serbian
- No. of series: 10

Production
- Running time: Various
- Production company: Pink Media Group

Original release
- Network: TV Pink
- Release: 6 September 2017 – present

Related
- Farma

Elita (Serbian Cyrillic: Елита, transl. The Elite), formerly known as Zadruga (Serbian Cyrillic: Задруга, transl. Cooperative), is a Serbian reality TV series broadcasting on TV Pink, as a successor of the Farm reality TV series. The first season started on 6 September 2017.

== Production ==
Some 1,500 people work in production of this show. For scenography, consultants and technicians from Hollywood were hired. Contestants are covered with 140 cameras which viewers can access. The Zadruga complex has a climate control unit, able to create different weather conditions, i.e. snow in May, rain in August etc.

== Synopsis ==
In the show, contestants called "zadrugari" (eng. cooperators) live together in a specially constructed community that is isolated from the outside world. The show's former title refers to the term zadruga, a type of rural community in which the institution of zadruga held people's property, herds and money in common, with usually the oldest (patriarch) member ruling and making decisions for the family. Contestants are voted out (usually on a weekly basis) until only one remains and wins the cash prize. During their stay in the house, they are continuously monitored by live television cameras as well as personal audio microphones.

== Concept ==
Each week a new leader (Serbian: vođa) is selected, who has responsibilities to the whole community and special benefits. He or she also has to give out budgets, which are meant for everyday use. Then the leader is supposed to choose two helpers (potrčko) and a favourite person (omiljena osoba). In the end of week two contestants will face the eviction. One of them is the helper with most votes received from other contestants and the other a contestant with least public votes throughout that week. On Sunday night two of them will again face public vote, but they will also play a game, which if won can double the percentage the contestant's votes and possibly save him/her from the eviction.

The complex includes the 'White House', where the contestants live, hotel, in which the leader a favourite person live, the 'Garden of Eden', where the 'Wise Tree' is placed, a supermarket, pub, casino, beauty parlour and a farm. Across the lake are the fast food restaurant, pawn shop, jail etc.

== Series overview ==
Season	Network	First aired	Last aired	Days	Winner	Nationality	Prize
1	TV Pink	6 September 2017	20 June 2018	287	Kija Kockar	Serbia	€50,000
2	TV Pink	6 September 2018	6 July 2019	303	Luna Đogani	Serbia	€50,000
3	TV Pink	6 September 2019	11 July 2020	309	Iva Grgurić	Croatia	€50,000
4	TV Pink	6 September 2020	10 July 2021	307	Nadica Zeljković	Serbia	€50,000
5	TV Pink	5 September 2021	10 July 2022	308	Dejan Dragojević	Serbia	€50,000
6	TV Pink	9 September 2022	10 June 2023	274	Aleksandra Nikolić	Serbia	€50,000
7	TV Pink	2 September 2023	13 July 2024	315	Anita Stanojlović	Serbia	€100,000
8	TV Pink	7 September 2024	20 July 2025	316	Nenad Marinković; Gasttozz	Serbia	€100,000
9	TV Pink	13 September 2025	20 July 2026	310	Stanija Dobrojević	Serbia	€100,000
10	TV Pink	5 September 2026	Ongoing	1	To be announced		

== Controversy ==
Zadruga has received criticism for the display of scenes of physical and verbal violence, which has questioned the national frequency of Pink and the role of the Regulatory Authority for Electronic Media (REM). In May 2022, Media foundation Slavko Ćuruvija reported REM for their absence of appropriate reaction on the scenes of gender-related violence on Zadruga, which according to the foundation was a breach of the Law on Electronic Media and the Rulebook on the Protection of Human Rights. Subsequently in June, the Independent Association of Journalists of Serbia (NUNS) condemned Pink for promoting violence and illegal behavior.

Between March and June 2020, Nova.rs reported that there had been an alleged outbreak of COVID-19 between the contestants, which according to their sources, the producers tried to hide from the public. The third season of Zadruga continued filming in spite of the government instruction against public gatherings.

Another controversy has been in regards to contestant Miljana Kulić, who entered the first season of Zadruga pregnant and gave birth a month after the season had ended. Kulić has continued competing on every of the following seasons of Zadruga whilst also raising her son on the set, bringing up the question of the welfare and protection of her child.

== See also ==
- Parovi
- Big Brother (Serbian TV series)
