= Kija Kockar =

Serbian singer and TV personality

- Кија Коцкар
- Born: Kristina Kockar; 26 May 1989 (age 37); Zrenjanin, SFR Yugoslavia
- Occupations: Tv Host; Singer; Media personality; Flight attendant
- Spouse: Sloba Radanović (m. 2016; div. 2018)
- Mother: Nadica Zeljković
- Musical career
- Genres: Pop; pop-folk
- Instrument: Vocals
- Years active: 2018–present
- Labels: FM Play; Hype Production; MIXGY Music Group

Kristina Kockar (Serbian Cyrillic: Кристина Коцкар; born 26 May 1989), better known as Kija Kockar, is a Serbian television host and singer from Zrenjanin, who rose to prominence by winning the first season of the Serbian reality television show Zadruga in 2018.

== Early life ==
Kockar was born on 26 May 1989 in Zrenjanin, SFR Yugoslavia to mother Nadica Zeljković, who worked as a restaurant server. After graduating from the Zrenjanin Grammar School, Kija attended Hotelier College in Belgrade. Before becoming famous, she worked as a flight attendant in Airpink, Air Serbia and Etihad Airways.

== Media career ==
In November 2017, Kockar entered reality series Zadruga, aired on RTV Pink, as an anonymous personality after her husband had cheated on her with another contestant, Luna Đogani. She immediately attracted sympathies and support from the audience, eventually winning the show on 20 June the following year, with more than 55% of the public votes.

After the show, she decided to pursue a career in music with her debut single "Ne vraćam se na staro", released on 20 July 2018. The official music video for the song has collected more than thirty million views on YouTube. Additionally, in October 2019, Kija published her autobiography, titled Moj potpis (My Signature), in which she reflected on her relationship with Radanović and her time in Zadruga. Although becoming one of the biggest attractions at the Belgrade Book Fair, the book received polarizing reception in the public. Between 2018 and 2019, she also served as a judge on two talent shows broadcast on TV Pink, Pinkove Zvezde: All Talents and Pinkove Zvezdice: All Stars. In November, Kockar was declared the Serbian gay icon of 2018.

She released her debut EP, Da li si dovoljno lud da mi kažeš da?, under Hype Production in June 2021. Kockar as a presenter transferred from Hype TV to Informer TV in June 2023.

== Personal life ==
On 26 September 2016, Kockar married singer and former Pinkove Zvezde contestant, Slobodan Radanović. On 7 August 2018, it was reported that she had divorced from Radanović.

== Filmography ==
Filmography of Kija Kockar
Year	Title	Genre	Role	Notes
2017-2018	Zadruga	Television	Herself	Season 1; Winner
2018-2019	Pinkove Zvezdice	Television	Herself	Season 5: All Stars; Judge
2019	Pinkove Zvezde	Television	Herself	Season 4: All Talents; Judge

== Discography ==
Studio albums

- Kija (2021)

Extended plays

- Da li si dovoljno lud da mi kažeš da? (2022; also titled Karijera)

Singles

- "Ne vraćam se na staro" (2018); feat. Ministarke
- "Potpis" (2018)
- "Ko bi rekao" (2018); feat. Stoja
- "Amorova strela" (2019)
- "Zlatan" (2019)
- "Sanjam" (2019)
- "Bejbi" (2020)
- "Sviđaš mi se" (2020)
- "Da li si dovoljno lud da meni kažeš da" (2021)
- "Karijera" (2021)
- "Pepeljuga" (2022)

== Awards and nominations ==
Year	Award	Category	Nominee/work	Result	Ref.
2019	Music Awards Ceremony	Breakthrough Act	Herself	Nominated	
2020	Music Awards Ceremony	Folk Song of the Year	"Amorova strela"	Nominated	
