= Yutel =

Yugoslav television newscast (1990-1992)

- Presented by: Goran Milić; Gordana Suša; Zekerijah Smajić
- Country of origin: SFR Yugoslavia

Production
- Editor: Goran Milić
- Production company: Yutel

Original release
- Network: TV Sarajevo
- Release: 23 October 1990 – 11 May 1992

Yutel is a Yugoslav television newscast that ran between October 1990 and May 1992.

Financially supported by the Federal Executive Council (SIV) under the presidency of Ante Marković, Yutel was produced from the RTV Sarajevo broadcast centre.

== Background ==
In January 1990, the League of Communists of Yugoslavia (SKJ), the only political party in SFR Yugoslavia, dissolved along the lines of its six branches. Each newly independent political entity, formerly representing its own constituent republic at the Yugoslav federal level, soon reconstituted itself into a socialist or social-democratic party ahead of the upcoming multi-party elections, which were being prepared on the level of each constituent republic rather than the federal one.

Some six months later in July 1990, Ante Marković, an ethnic Croat from Bosnia presiding over the Federal Executive Council (SIV), formed his own party, Union of Reform Forces (SRSJ), with economic reform and EEC ascension central to its program. Seeing that the Yugoslav Radio Television (JRT) system was largely becoming marginalized due to its main broadcast centres from each respective constituent republic coming under local political control from within each republic, Marković sought to create a Yugoslavia-wide electronic media outlet that would present the views and policies of the SIV and SRSJ.

Controlled by a public company in which the Yugoslav state held controlling stake, the project was originally meant to be a Yugoslavia-wide television channel. However, local broadcast centers in each constituent republic, increasingly under firm control of local republic-level politicians who were generally disinterested in and even politically opposed to the federal perspective, mostly refused cooperation for such a media undertaking. That circumstance gave rise to the idea to broadcast the channel over satellite with a signal that would cover entire SFR Yugoslav territory as well as large parts of Western Europe and the Mediterranean, however, realization that only 100,000 households in SFR Yugoslavia at the time were equipped to receive a satellite signal put an end to that plan too.

Finally, an approach was made to the Yugoslav People's Army's (JNA) main staff by the Federal Secretariat of Information agreeing signal relays, equipment, access to army communications infrastructure, and helicopters for transporting people and equipment since the JNA already invested funds into its own project of mobile television. The channel also got a name, Yutel, signifying 'Yugoslavia' and 'television'. It also got its management with Nebojša "Bato" Tomašević, longtime editor-in-chief of Jugoslovenska revija getting named as Yutel's CEO. Goran Milić, well-known TV Belgrade personality, became the head of Yutel's news division while the station headquarters were selected to be in Motovun, a town in Istria. Milić who left TV Belgrade to join Yutel, went all over Yugoslavia to individual radio-television centres in search of journalists willing to join the upstart network through running local news bureaus.

However, Yugoslav Secretary of Defense and JNA chief of staff, general Veljko Kadijević reneged on the earlier promise, saying that JNA needs its frequencies for flight path control and doesn't have sufficient funds in its budget to service a television network thereby effectively killing Yutel's plans of broadcasting independently of the local constituent republic TV centers. The plan of setting up an entire channel was pretty much dead too.

The next plan was producing an hour-long nightly newscast also named Yutel and broadcasting it over TV Belgrade's upstart third channel (3K) that lacked content, however, TV Belgrade's CEO Dušan Mitević rejected the idea. Finally, the people behind Yutel went to TV Sarajevo, agreeing access to TV Sarajevo's network and production facilities for a fixed fee. After Marković and SIV approved the fee payment to TV Sarajevo, Yutel was cleared to start broadcasting, however, only as a nightly hour-long newscast instead of the originally planned full television channel.

== See also ==
- Concert Yutel for Peace
