= Radio Pink =

Serbian radio station

- Type: Broadcast radio network
- Country: Serbia
- First air date: 19 December 1993
- Headquarters: Belgrade
- Parent: Pink International Company
- Official website: pinkradio.rs
- Language: Serbian

Radio Pink is a Serbian radio station established by Željko Mitrović, the president of the Pink International Company. It was created on December 19, 1993 as one of the first commercial radio stations in Yugoslavia, and broadcast music 24 hours a day.
