= Red TV (Serbian TV channel) =

Serbian pay television channel

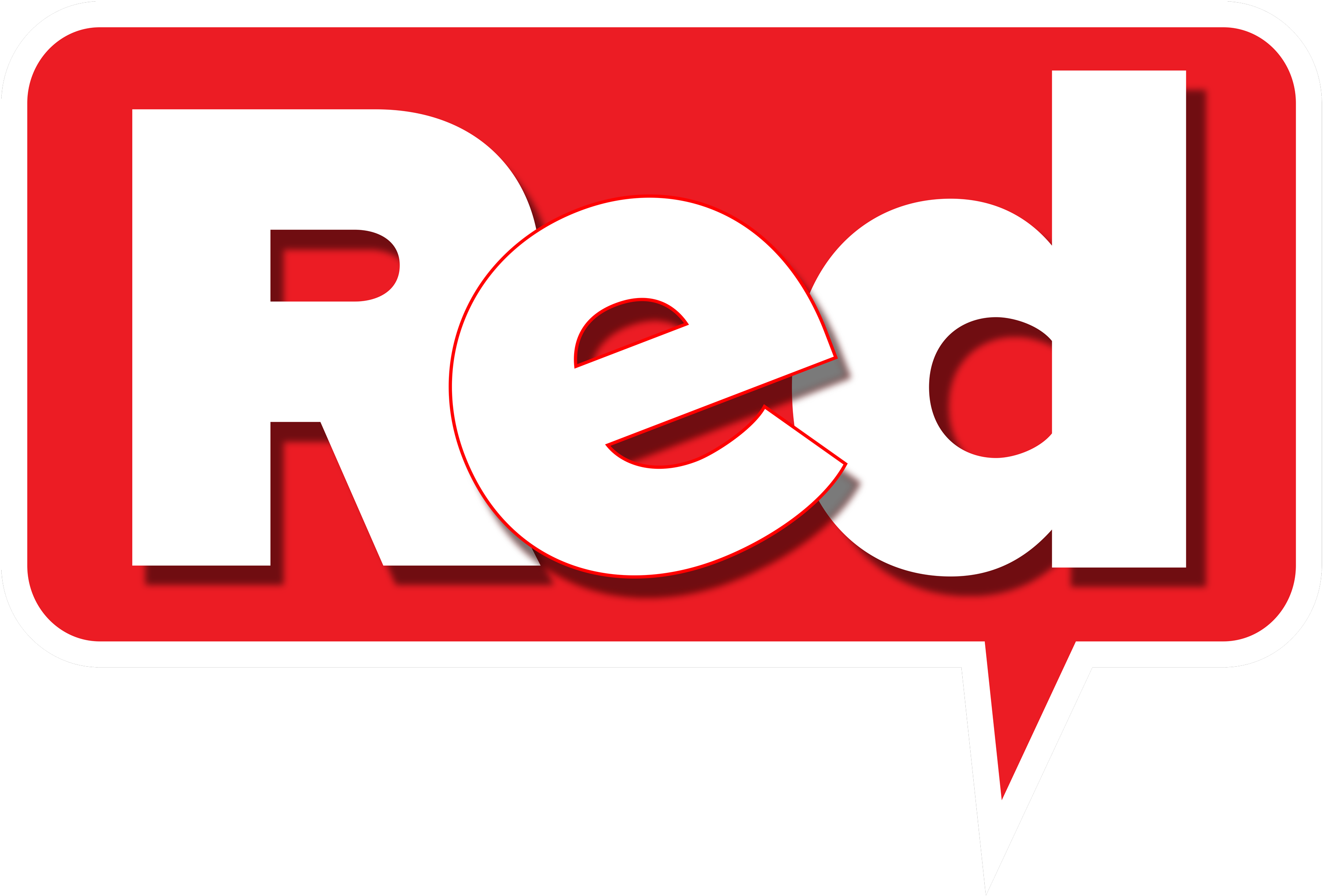
- Country: Serbia
- Broadcast area: Serbia; Bosnia and Herzegovina; Montenegro

Programming
- Language: Serbian
- Picture format: 1080i (HDTV)

Ownership
- Owner: Pink International Company
- Sister channels: Pink

History
- Launched: Television: 4 November 2012 (as Pink 2); 3 October 2020 (as Red TV); Radio: 2020

Links
- Website: redportal.rs

Red TV is a Serbian pay television channel distributed in Bosnia, Montenegro and Serbia, owned by Pink International Company.

Launched on 4 November 2012 as Pink 2, it began broadcasting as Red TV on 3 October 2020.
