= Zorica Brunclik =

Serbian singer (born 1955)

Zorica Brunclik Зорица Брунцлик
- Also known as: Živorad Miljković; S. Orsana
- Born: 29 June 1955 (age 71); Belgrade, PR Serbia, Yugoslavia
- Genres: Folk
- Occupations: Singer; lyricist; TV personality
- Years active: 1974–present
- Labels: PGP-RTB; PGP-RTS; Diskos; Diskoton; Južni Vetar; Grand Production; City Records
- Spouse(s): Zoran Tutić (divorced) Ljubo Kešelj (divorced) Miroljub Aranđelović Kemiš (m. 1985)

Zorica Brunclik (Serbian Cyrillic: Зорица Брунцлик; born 29 June 1955) is a Serbian singer and lyricist. Known for her signature hot pink colored hair, she is recognized as one of the most successful Serbian folk singers.

== Early life ==
Zorica Brunclik was born on 29 June 1955 in Belgrade, Yugoslavia to a Serb mother and Czech-Greek father. Her parents divorced during her early years. She grew up between Smederevo and Požarevac. According to Brunclik, her mother, who predominately raised her and her three brothers, was financially struggling living off of one paycheck.

Brunclik graduated from the Faculty of Economics at the University of Niš.

== Career ==
In 1969, Brunclik was introduced to singing by folk singer Bora Spužić Kvaka. After several years of performing as a working singer, with the help from songwriter Novica Urošević she released her first single "Ne daj da nas rastave" in 1974 under PGP-RTB. Two years later, Brunclik released her debut studio album. Over the years, she has collectively released 27 albums. Having sold 15 million records in total, she is recognized as one of the commercially most successful Serbian folk singers of all time. Some of her well-known songs include: "A tebe nema" (1982), "Avlije, avlije" (1991), "Kada bi me pitali", "Tamo gde si ti", "Što se mala uobrazi" (1995), "Dunjo mirisna" (1997), "Otkopčano jeleče" (1998) and "Ne dam ovo malo duše" (2002). Additionally, Brunclik has received numerous accolades, including the National Music Artist of Serbia award from the Union of Music Artists of Serbia (SEMUS) in May 2021.

In addition to singing, Brunclik also wrote lyrics for herself and other artists. She used her cousin Živorad Miljković's name as a pseudonym for songwriting purposes. Songs that she wrote include "A tebe nema", "Preboleću" (1982), "Ne dam dušu da greše" (1988), which she also composed, and "Što ne dođeš" (1985). Other artists she had written lyrics for include Zoran Jovanović, Asim Brkan, Merima Njegomir, Angel Dimov, etc. Her other pseudonym was S. Orsana.

On 11 November 2014, Brunclik celebrated forty years of her career with a solo concert in the Belgrade Arena, titled Sve je ljubav (Everything is Love). The live show featured guest performances from more than thirty regional musicians, including: Lepa Brena, Ceca, Dragana Mirković, Vesna Zmijanac, Saša Matić, Aca Lukas, Željko Joksimović, Sinan Sakić, Ana Bekuta and Aco Pejović. On 28 June 2022, she held a concert in the Tašmajdan Center to celebrate close to fifty years of work. Footage from the concert aired on the Radio Television of Serbia on 1 January the following year.

Outside of her career in music, she starred in the movies Kakav deda takav unuk (1983) and Špijun na štiklama (1988). Between March and June 2010, Brunclik participated on the second season of the reality television show Farma, where she placed 6th. She also served as a judge on the singing competitions Zvezde Granda (2013–2015) and Pinkove Zvezde (2016–2017).

== Personal life ==
Brunclik was married three times. Her first two husbands were Serbian accordion players Zoran Tutić and Ljubo Kešelj. Since 1985, she has been married to Serbian accordion player and composer, Miroljub Aranđelović Kemiš. Brunclik has four children: a daughter she gave birth to at 18, a son with Tutić, a daughter with Kešelj and a daughter with Kemiš.

Reportedly, she was a close personal friend of the Serbian politician and wife of Slobodan Milošević, Mirjana Marković, and was a member of the Yugoslav Left. Brunclik stated that she and her family faced inconveniences from the protestors several days after the overthrow of Slobodan Milošević on 5 October 2000. She has publicly endorsed Aleksandar Vučić.

== Discography ==
- Ne daj da nas rastave (1976)
- Aj, mene majka jednu ima (1977)
- Između Mene i tebe (1979)
- Tri noći ljubavi (1979)
- Odakle si sele (1980)
- Pahuljica (1981)
- Ako te poljubim (1981)
- Radosti moja (1982)
- Ti si moja najslađa bol (1983)
- Uteši me (1984)
- Ja sam tvoja karamela (1985)
- Neću da te menjam (1986)
- Ne dam da mi krila lome (1987)
- Muke moje (1988)
- Eh da je sreće (1989)
- Rođeni jedno za drugo (1990)
- Ja znam (1992)
- Branili su našu ljubav (1993)
- Kada bi me pitali (1995)
- Kad procvetaju zumbuli (1996)
- Dunjo mirisna (1997)
- Celog života žalim za tobom (1998)
- Ej, sudbino (2000)
- Težak je ovaj život (2002)
- Rođendana dva (2004)
- Zorica Brunclik (2006)
- Trebaš mi (2017)

== Filmography ==
Filmography of Zorica Brunclik
Year	Title	Genre	Role	Notes
1983	Kakav deda takav unuk	Film	Singer	Cameo appearance
1988	Špijun na štiklama	Film	Singer	Cameo appearance
2010	Farma	Television	Herself	Season 2, 6th place
2013-2015	Zvezde Granda	Television	Herself	Judge
2016-2017; 2025-present	Pinkove Zvezde	Television	Herself	Judge
2022	Na večeri kod	Television	Herself	Season 4, Winning team

== Festivals ==
- 1977 Hit of the Summer – "Zivot si mi odneo sa sobom"
- 1978 Ilidža Music Festival – "Kad udjes u moj dom"
- 1978 Hit Parade – "Cuti ja te molim"
- 1982 Hit Parade – "Plava Ljubicica"
- 1986 Hit Parade – "Ti si mi bio sve"
- 1988 Ilidža Music Festival – "Ne imao srece"
- 1990 MESAM – "Evo vec je Bozic"
- 1990 Šumadijski Sabor – "Ja Znam"
- 1992 MESAM – "Sve je ljubav"
- 1992 Šumadijski Sabor – "Ubile me oci zelene"
- 1993 Moravski Biseri – "Veliki grad"
- 1993 Šumadijski Sabor – "Na kestenu starom"
- 1994 Moravski Biseri – "Tako je kod Srba"
- 1994 Šumadijski Sabor – "Niko nije rodjen da bude sam"
- 1996 MESAM – "Prazna ostala mi dusa"
- 2006 Grand Festival – "Dan po dan"
- 2010 Grand Festival – "Moja zakletvo"
