= Pink M =

Montenegrin TV channel

- Type: Free-to-air television network
- Country: Montenegro
- Headquarters: Podgorica

Programming
- Picture format: 1080i (HDTV)

Ownership
- Owner: Pink Media Group
- Parent: Pink International Company
- Sister channels: Pink TV; Pink BH; Pink Family; Pink Soap; Pink Kids; Pink Super Kids; Pink Reality

History
- Launched: 22 October 2018; 7 years ago
- Former names: Pink Media (2018)

Pink M is a Montenegrin cable television channel based in Podgorica. It was established on 3 September 2018 as Pink Media when Pink Media Group sold its terrestrial commercial channels "Pink M" (now Nova M) and "Pink BH" (now Nova BH) to The United Group.

== Programming ==
Pink M channel lineup consists of programmes from Pink's terrestrial channel Pink TV or Pink World intended to linear broadcasting or re-broadcasting on the Montenegro market. By concept and name, a similar television channel called Pink BH which exists in Bosnia and Herzegovina.

=== News ===
- Minut 2 - daily news bulletin, every full hour - duration 2 minutes with an overview of the most important news for and from Montenegro.

=== Entertainment ===
- Zadruga - reality TV show from Serbia.

=== Series, Telenovelas ===
October 2019:

Original name	Bosnian translation	Origin
Elif	Elif	(Turkey)
Cesur ve Güzel	Ljubav iz osvete	(Turkey)
Crveni mesec	Crveni mesec	(Serbia)
