= Bora Spužić Kvaka =

Bora Spužić Kvaka Бора Спужић Квака
- Birth name: Velibor Spužić
- Also known as: Kvaka
- Born: 10 November 1934; Orahovac, Vardar Banovina, Kingdom of Yugoslavia
- Died: 9 March 2002 (aged 67); Požarevac, Serbia, FR Yugoslavia
- Genres: Traditional, folk, blues
- Occupation: Singer
- Years active: 1969–1996

Bora Spužić (Serbian Cyrillic: Бора Спужић; 10 November 1934 – 9 March 2002), better known by his nickname Kvaka (Serbian Cyrillic: Квака), was a Serbian vocalist and recording artist with a career spanning almost three decades.

== Biography ==
Spužić was born as Velibor Spužić (Serbian Cyrillic: Велибор Спужић) on 10 November 1934 in the Metohija town of Orahovac to father Todor and mother Olga. He was the fifth of six children in the family. In 1941, the Spužić family had to emigrate from Kosovo, deciding on Ćićevac. While living in Ćićevac at the very end of the war in 1945, he fell from a tree during a playground game and dislocated his hip. As a result, his left leg remained twenty-five centimetres shorter than his right leg. Due to that fracture, he had to wear a cast for eleven months after which he had to spend a lot of time in the Sremska Kamenica hospital and his education was late by a few years. From Ćićevac, the family moved to Zemun and shortly after to Požarevac where his father gained employment as a clerk in the Tax Administration. Spužić began singing and playing the accordion in Požarevac using his neighbour's accordion.

He was a member of the cultural arts society KUD Abrašević where he first received the nickname Kvaka thanks to his friend's mispronunciation in calling him a fakin (the Serbian language version of a guappo, usually translated as mangup). In the 1952–53 school year, he left high school and got his first job in the Dunav kafana in Veliko Gradište. There they bought him an accordion which he had to pay off by singing on the condition that he stays in the kafana until the debt is paid off. He also played Mexican songs.

In 1968 in the Pančevo Army Hall, he met Budimir "Buca" Jovanović who at that time was already a known composer of folk music. Jovanović offered him to record a single with four songs. The single was recorded by Zagreb-based Jugoton. It sold 400,000 copies and had a silver and gold publication.

In the Summer of 1968, the director of Beogradska estrada Rade Mumin offered him a contract. He had his first serious appearance that same year in the Dom Sindikata in Belgrade with the song Pođimo u krčmu staru. In Autumn of that same year, he competed in the festival in Sokobanja where the audience awarded him first place. In 1970, he recorded his second single and at the Ilidža '69 Festival where the expert jury co-awarded him and Nada Mamula first place.

His first album was published in 1971 by Jugoton. The album contained the songs from his first five singles.

He lived a bohemian lifestyle, earning and spending money quickly. He enjoyed the company of women and kafanas and married four times. His popularity rose quickly – reaching the top – but decreased gradually over time. He published twenty-three singles, sixteen albums and three CD-s.

He held his last concert in 1996. In 1997, he had a stroke which robbed him of using the entire right side of his body and speaking ability. He managed to recover thanks to Hanka Paldum who brought him to Sarajevo and financed the expenses of his recovery. In March 1998, a large humanitarian concert was held in the Požarevac Sports Hall and all benefits went towards Spužić's recovery. The most responsible for this concert were Zoran Kalezić and Zorica Brunclik.

Spužić died on 9 March 2002 in Požarevac. He was interred on 11 March 2002 at the Požarevac Old Cemetery. He had two daughters.

== Discography ==
=== Albums ===
- 1971. Bora Spužić Kvaka (Jugoton)
- 1972. Svirajte mi noćas (Jugoton)
- 1975. Dođi, dođi ljubavi (PGP RTB)
- 1979. Ako sretneš majku moju (Beograd disk)
- 1980. Goranine, čobanine (CFS Košutnjak)
- 1981. Bora Spuzic Kvaka (PGP RTB)
- 1983. Za sina da nađem majku (Jugodisk)
- 1984. Ti si prava žena (Jugodisk)
- 1990. Lažno srce (Jugodisk)
