= Zrenjanin Gymnasium =

School in Serbia

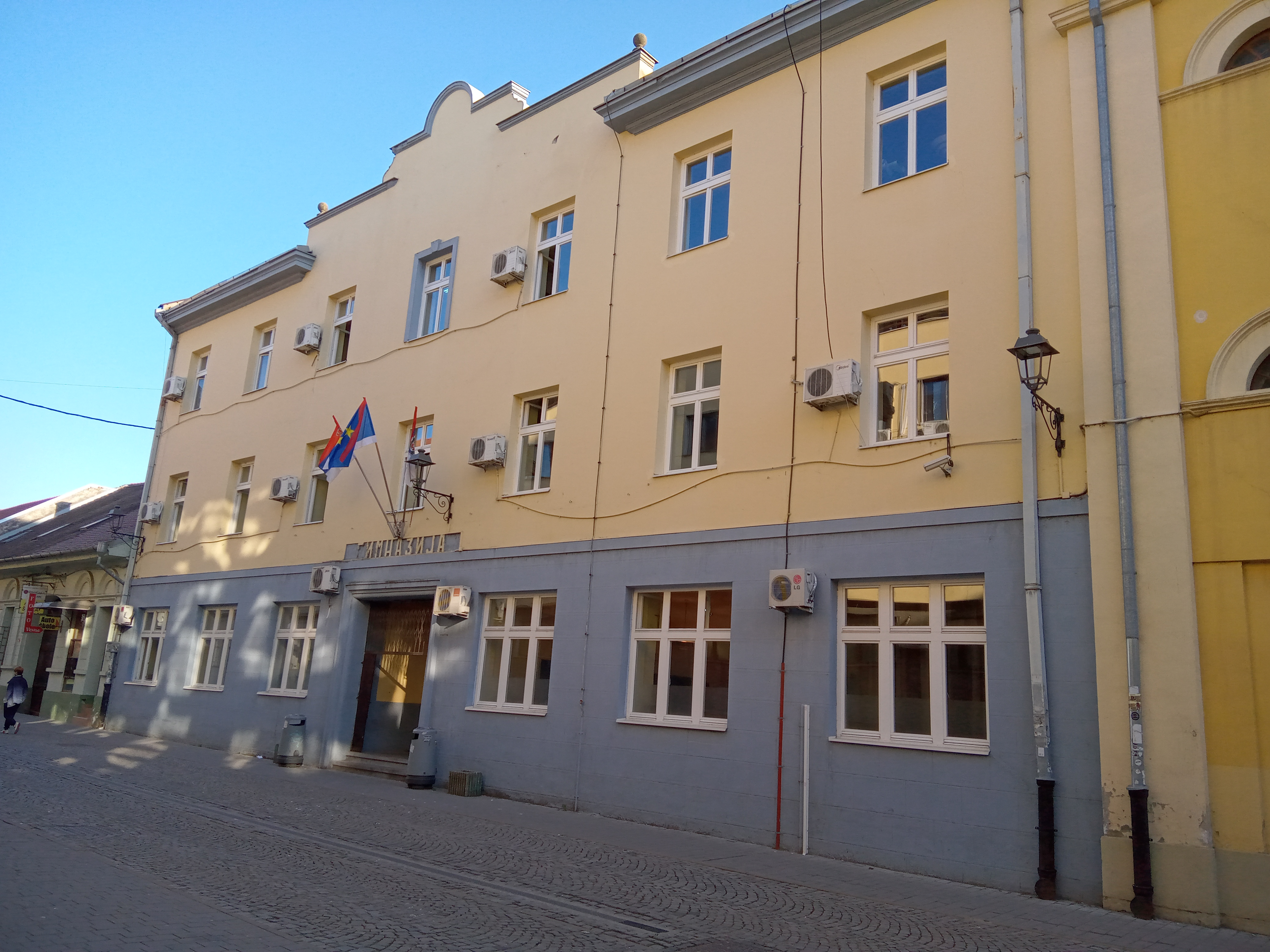
- Zrenjanin Gymnasium main entrance

Location
- 45.3795°N 20.3918°E

Zrenjanin Gymnasium (Serbian: Зрењанинска гимназија, Zrenjaninska gimnazija) is the oldest secondary school in Zrenjanin. It was established in 1846 as a Piarist school. At the beginning, the school was primarily Hungarian, although Serbs were a large minority in Veliki Bečkerek. Students were obliged to learn the Hungarian and German languages (after 1907 only Hungarian). The gymnasium became Serbian after 1918. The school today has one class in the Hungarian language.

== Building ==
The school building was built in 1846. It has two floors. It was enlarged in 1937, by adding a yard wing. Unfortunately, the street facade lost its decoration after World War II. The Piarist church was built at the same time as the building, just aside it, as a part of the Gymnasium complex.

== Famous students ==
- Branimir Brstina, actor
- Goran Knežević, politician and a mayor of Zrenjanin
- Kija Kockar, singer and a TV personality
- Vasilije Krestić, historian
- Gyula Pártos, Hungarian architect
- Čedomir Popov, historian, current chairman of Matica srpska
