= Pink BH =

Bosnian cable television channel based in Sarajevo

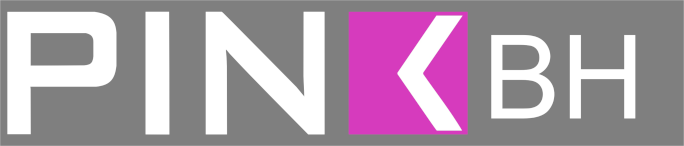
- Type: Free-to-air television network
- Country: Bosnia and Herzegovina
- Availability: National
- Headquarters: Sarajevo, Bosnia and Herzegovina
- Owner: Pink Media Group
- Parent: Pink International Company
- Launch date: 22 October 2018
- Former names: Pink Media BH (2018)
- Picture format: 1080i (HDTV)
- Affiliations: Pink TV; Pink M; Pink Family; Pink Soap; Pink Kids; Pink Super Kids; Pink Reality

Pink BH is a Bosnian cable television channel based in Sarajevo. It was established on 3 September 2018 as Pink Media BH when Pink Media Group sold its terrestrial commercial channels Pink BH (now Nova BH) and Pink M (now Nova M) (now Nova M) to The United Group.

== Programming ==
Pink BH channel lineup consists of programmes from Pink's terrestrial channel Pink TV intended for linear broadcasting or re-broadcasting on the Bosnian market. By concept and name, a similar tv channel called Pink M is intended for public in neighboring Montenegro.

=== News ===
- Minut 2 - daily news bulletin, every full hour - duration 2 minutes with an overview of the most important news for and from Bosnia and Herzegovina.

=== Entertainment ===
- Zadruga - reality TV show
- Pinkove Zvezdice - music singing contest for kids
- Pinkove Zvezde - music singing contest for adults
- Bravo Show - music show
- Ami G Show - talk show hosted by Ognjen Amidžić
- Premijera - tv magazine about celebrities
- Ekskluzivno - tv magazine about celebrities
- Premijera vikend specijal - tv magazine about celebrities
- Akademija debelih - reality show
- Kuvanje i muvanje - cooking show
- Prvi kuvar Srbije - reality cooking show
- Kuća od srca - TV show of humanitarian character
- Izvedi me - Take Me Out

=== Series, Telenovelas ===
September 2018:

Original name	Bosnian translation	Origin
O Hayat Benim	Bahar	(Turkey)
Çoban Yıldızı	Zavjet	(Turkey)
Šifra Despot	Шифра Деспот	(Serbia)
