= Pljugica =

Serbian rapper

Pljugica Пљугица
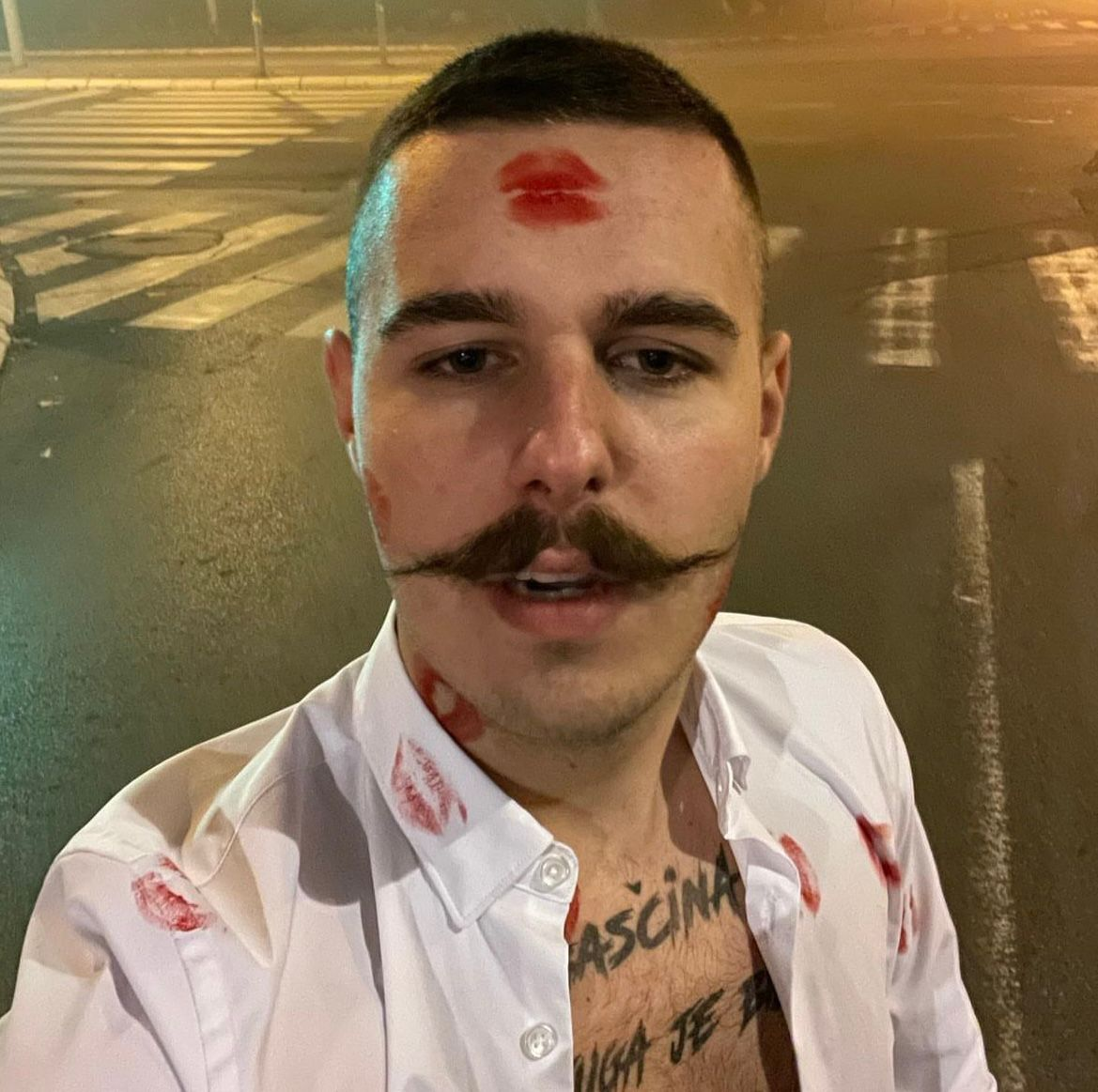

Background information
- Born: Luka Bijelović; December 20, 2000 (age 25); Novi Sad, Serbia, FR Yugoslavia
- Genres: Trap music, Turbo folk
- Years active: 2016-present

Luka Bijelović (Serbian Cyrillic: Лука Бијеловић; born: December 20, 2000), better known by his stage name Lule Pljugica or simply Pljugica, is a Serbian musician.

== Biography ==
Luka Bijelović was born in 2000 in Novi Sad. In his hometown, he finished design school, and since 2016 he has been uploading videos to YouTube.

He began his music career in 2022, when together with Dragomir Despić, better known as Desingerica, he released his first single “Kucci Kucci.” The song quickly gained attention from the public and media, since they stopped a highway for the purpose of filming the music video.

In the summer, this duo collaborated with Lacku, with whom they released the song “Pistacc.” Then, in September, the song “Balkanacc” was released, representing a fusion of rap and turbo-folk. By the end of the year, the songs “Tuckavacc” and “Praccka” followed, and at the beginning of 2023, they released the duets “Ficcni” and “Novacc.” At the end of June 2023, he performed at the Belgrade Music Week festival at Ušće in front of several tens of thousands of visitors.

== Discography ==
=== Singles ===
- “Kucci Kucci” (ft. Desingerica, 2022)
- “Pistacc” (ft. Desingerica, Lacku, 2022)
- “Balkanacc” (ft. Desingerica, 2022)
- “Tuckavacc” (ft. Desingerica, 2022)
- “Praccka” (ft. Desingerica, Lacku, 2022)
- “Ficcni” (ft. Desingerica, 2023)
- “Novacc” (ft. Desingerica, 2023)
- “Merccedecc” (ft. Desingerica, Djexon, Coja, 2023)
- “Recci” (ft. Desingerica, 2023)
- “Djuskavacc” (ft. Desingerica, 2023)
- “Fleccc” (ft. Desingerica, 2023)
- “Heart of Carbon” (2023)
- “Pile of Cash” (2024)
- “I Whisper” (2024)
- “Opa opa” (2024)
- “Bastard” (2024)
- “Davaj, davaj” (ft. Bilyanish, 2024)
