= Kristina Đukić =

Serbian influencer (2000–2021)

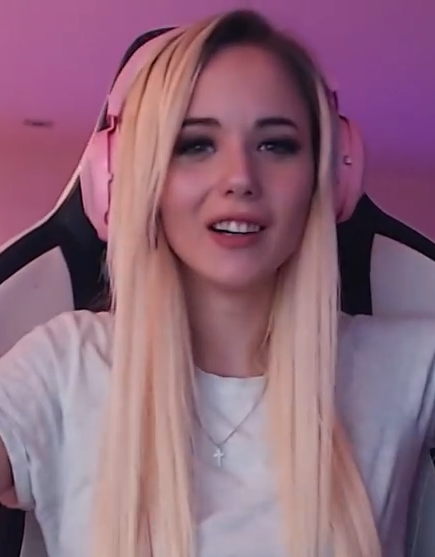
- Đukić in December 2021, shortly before her death
- Born: 25 July 2000; Belgrade, Serbia, FR Yugoslavia
- Died: 8 December 2021 (aged 21); Belgrade, Serbia
- Other names: Kika; k1kax3
- Occupations: YouTuber; live streamer

YouTube information
- Channel: K1KAx
- Years active: 2015–2021
- Genres: Gaming; vlog
- Subscribers: 809 thousand
- Views: 89.1 million
- Last updated: 2 July 2026

Kristina Đukić (Serbian Cyrillic: Кристина Ђукић; 25 July 2000 – 8 December 2021), better known by her alias Kika (Serbian Cyrillic: Кика, stylised as K1KA), was a Serbian YouTuber and livestreamer.

Born in Belgrade in 2000, Kika began her solo YouTube career in 2015. Initially, she had recorded content related to Minecraft, but later moved on to Grand Theft Auto V, Counter-Strike: Global Offensive, and League of Legends. She was involved in an online drama with Baka Prase in 2019, which received national attention, and was later a target of cyberbullying. Kika's death was announced to the public on 9 December 2021; it raised suspicion that she had died by suicide, although her mother claimed that she was allegedly the subject of a murder.

== Internet career ==
Before opening her YouTube channel, Kika had a channel with her friend Katy called "Kika and Katy". At first Kika quoted "private reasons" as the reason "Kika and Katy" was dissolved, but later confirmed that that the two had gotten into a fight. Kika launched her channel in March 2015 where she began posting Minecraft content. Given that she was one of the few Serbian female YouTubers at that time, Kika managed to gather attention quickly, garnering 1,000 subscribers in less than a month. At one point her channel was the fastest-growing channel in the Balkans, and in less than a year she had amassed 50,000 subscribers. Kika later expanded her content to include Grand Theft Auto V and Counter-Strike: Global Offensive, as well as reaction videos and Vlogs, all of which fostered more popularity for her. Videos with her mom were extremely popular with a number of them surpassing 2 million views; these videos were not gaming-related. Later on Kika also launched a Twitch account, where she mainly livestreamed League of Legends. She uploaded her only music video in 2019. Kika was also involved in esports and was a member of several esports organisations. She was known for her skills in Counter-Strike: Global Offensive in particular, playing the game at a competitive level.

Kika had received national attention after being involved in an online drama with Baka Prase, a Serbian YouTuber, in 2019. The two had also argued on a television show which aired on Prva; thereafter Kika became a target of cyberbullying by Baka Prase and his followers, which allegedly negatively impacted her mental health.

== Personal life ==
Kika was born on 25 July 2000 in Belgrade, where she finished primary school. She enrolled in an engineering class in the Belgrade Trade School, but switched to a trading school. Kika was offered to take part in the Sinđelići television series, although she declined the offer; she later stated that "rejecting the role was the worst move in my career".

== Death ==
On 9 December 2021, it was revealed to the public that Kika had died the previous day. Although not revealed at first, the police confirmed that her body was found around 11:40 pm in her apartment, including medication, which raised suspicion that she died by suicide. Her funeral was held on 14 December. In July 2022, the Public Court had concluded that her death was caused by an overdose of MDMA and bromazepam. In a 23 July video, Kika's mother had claimed that Kika was murdered. She had also noted that Kika's farewell letter was written by an unknown person at her computer a day after her death. Baka Prase had later published a video in which he agreed with Kika's mother and stated a similar theory regarding her death.

Due to her involvement in the drama that took place in 2019, Baka Prase was subsequently detained and sent to questioning. He was later released on the same day. The Independent Association of Journalists of Serbia (NUNS) had strongly condemned the "shameful reporting about the person who committed suicide" and stated that many media tabloids allegedly violated the Code of Journalists of Serbia.

== See also ==
- List of unsolved deaths
