= Viki Miljković =

Serbian singer (born 1974)

Viki Miljković Вики Миљковић
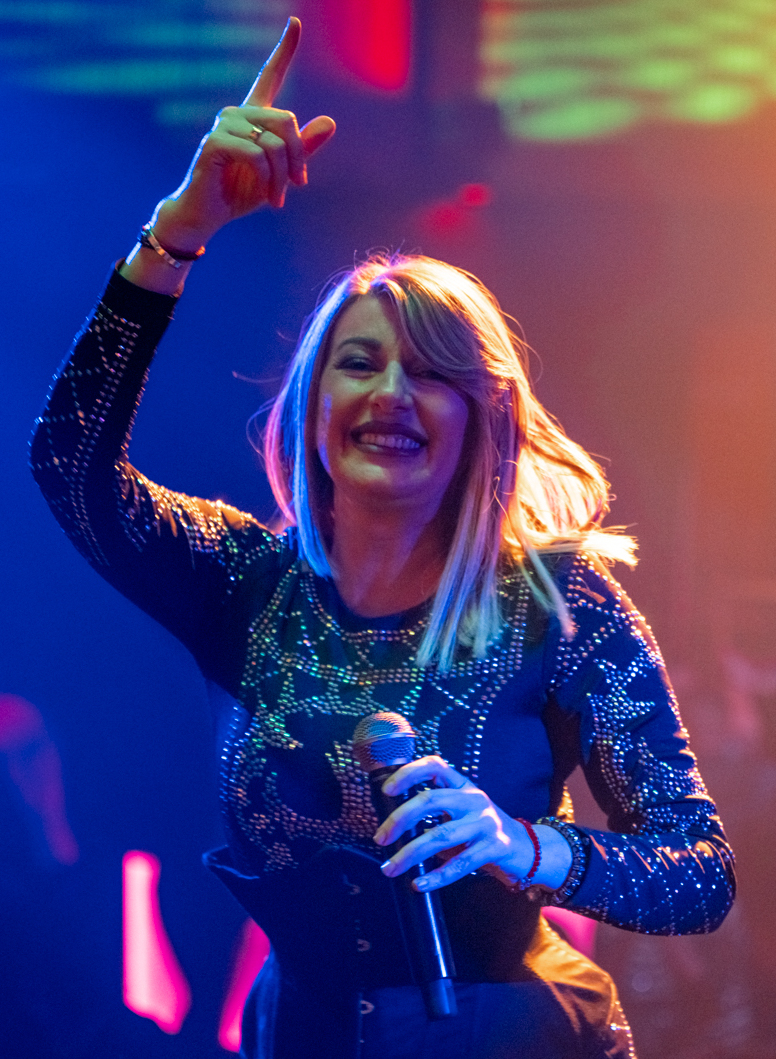
- Viki Miljković in 2019

Background information
- Born: Violeta Miljković; 18 December 1974 (age 51); Niš, SR Serbia, SFR Yugoslavia
- Genres: Turbo-folk
- Occupations: Singer; TV personality
- Years active: 1992–present
- Labels: Diskos; Grand Production
- Spouse: Dragan Tašković (m. 2007)

Violeta "Viki" Miljković (Serbian Cyrillic: Виолета "Вики" Миљковић; born 18 December 1974) is a Serbian singer. Born in Niš, she debuted in 1992 and has so far released ten studio albums. Her best known songs include "Crno na belo", "Mariš li" (2003), "Ti muškarac" and "Mahi, mahi" (2005).

She has served as a judge on televised singing shows Zvezde Granda (2015-2025) and Pinkove Zvezde (2025-present).

== Career ==
Born and raised in Niš, Viki started performing as a teenager alongside her brother who played the accordion. After getting discovered by the song-writing duo Marina Tucaković and Aleksandar Radulović, she released her debut album, Loša sreća (Bad Luck, 1992), under Diskos. However, it was only the following year that Viki saw significant commercial success with her second release and breakout hit "Nikom nije lepše nego nama" (No One Has It Better Than Us). Her music career peaked in the early 2000s with albums Mariš li (Do You Care, 2003) and Mahi, mahi (2005), released through Grand Production. In 2006, Viki held her first solo concert in Belgrade's Sava Centar.

In 2015, Miljković began appearing on the televised singing competition Zvezde Granda as a judge and mentor. In 2022, she had a winning contestant as a mentor with Nermin Handžić.

== Personal life ==
Miljković has a degree in musical arts from the Faculty of Arts, University of Pristina.

In 2007, she married accordion player Dragan Tašković "Taške", with whom she has a son, born in October the same year. It has been noted that Miljković has maintained close friendships with singers Ceca Ražnatović and Sanja Đorđević, who served as bridesmaids at her wedding.

Miljković and her husband publicly endorsed Aleksandar Vučić for the 2023 Serbian parliamentary election.

== Discography ==
Studio albums

- Loša sreća (1992)
- Hajde, vodi me odavde (1994)
- Svadbe neće biti (1995)
- Tunel (1996)
- Kud puklo da puklo (1997)
- Okrećem ti leđa, tugo (1998)
- Godine (2001)
- Mariš li (2003)
- Mahi, mahi (2005)
- Ovde se ne plače (2009)

Compilations

- The Best Of (2011)

== See also ==
- Music of Serbia
- List of singers from Serbia
- Turbo-folk
