= RTS 3 =

- Country: Serbia

Programming
- Picture format: 1080i (16:9) (HDTV)

Ownership
- Owner: RTS
- Sister channels: RTS 1 RTS 2

History
- Launched: 26 November 2008; 17 years ago
- Former names: RTS Digital (2008–2015)

Links
- Website: Official website

Availability

Terrestrial
- Digital: Channel 3

RTS 3 (Serbian: РТС 3), known as RTS Program Three (Serbian: Трећи програм РТС-а, romanized: Treći program RTS-a), or Treći (Serbian: Трећи) is a Serbian public TV channel operated by Radio Television of Serbia (RTS). The channel's programming is dedicated mostly to culture and the arts. It started broadcasting in 2008 on the digital terrestrial network, hence its former name, RTS Digital. It changed to its current name in 2015.

== History ==
RTS Digital started broadcasting on 26 November 2008 in a year marked by the fiftieth anniversary of RTS's television broadcasts. It was initially available on the Avala and Iriški venc transmitters, the first to have digital terrestrial signals. Outside these areas, the channel could only be found on Telekom Srbija's IPTV platform. In its first year on air, 70% of its programming consisted of national and international musical content, including concerts from notable philharmonics and conductors. The rest largely consisted of programs from its archives. Taking advantage of the digital terrestrial platform, the channel was the first RTS service to broadcast in the 16:9 aspect ratio.

The channel's ratings increased substantially, reaching a record high in October 2012. RTS officials claim that the increase was due to the upgrade of the Serbian DTT network from DVB-T to DVB-T2, coupled with that, the expansion of its digital transmitter network.

On 8 June 2015, RTS Digital was renamed RTS 3. As of 2023, the channel is not available on all cable and satellite television companies, despite having digital terrestrial coverage nationwide. It was expected to become must-carry once a revision to the Electronic Media Law was approved.
