= Pink SI =

Slovenian television station

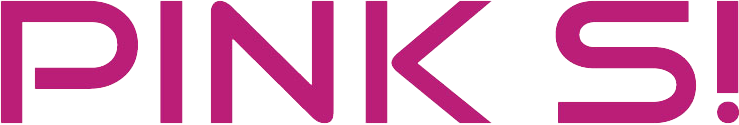
- Country: Slovenia

Programming
- Picture format: 16:9

Ownership
- Owner: Pink International Company (Pink Media Group)

History
- Launched: September 30, 2010

Pink SI is a Slovenian television station owned by the Serbian media company, Pink.

The channel changed its name to Pink 3 in March 2012. In September of the same year, the channel rebranded as TV3 Medias. In December 2017 it was renamed to TV3 Slovenija, due to new owners politics.
