= Pink Media Group =

Serbian media company headquartered in Belgrade

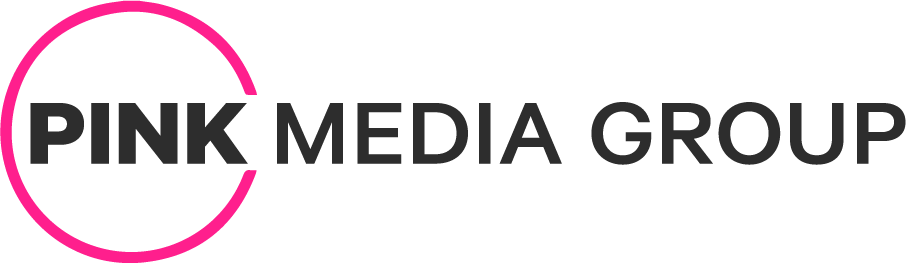
- Logo since 2021
- Company type: d.o.o.
- Industry: Mass media
- Founded: 25 June 1998; 27 years ago
- Headquarters: Neznanog junaka 1, Belgrade, Serbia
- Key people: Željko Mitrović (CEO)
- Products: Television; Radio; Film Production; Video streaming Record label
- Revenue: ▼€80.63 million (2023)
- Net income: ▲€16.09 million (2023)
- Total assets: ▲€214.16 million (2023)
- Total equity: ▲€107.75 million (2023)
- Owner: Željko Mitrović (100%)
- Number of employees: 879 (2023)
- Subsidiaries: Subsidiaries
- Website: pinkmediagroup.net

Pink Media Group, formerly known as Pink International Company, is a Serbian mass media company headquartered in Belgrade.

The company is run and owned by Željko Mitrović, and operates a various companies including: Pink TV, Red TV, Rock Radio, City Records (record label), Apollon (video streaming service), and PFI Studios (film production studio), Odeon Theatre, and PR-DC (aerospace R&D center).

== History ==
Registered as a limited liability company, Pink Media Group is owned by Serbian businessman and entrepreneur Željko Mitrović who amassed his fortune during the 1990s under the regime of Slobodan Milošević. Mitrović was a close personal friend of Milošević's wife Mira Marković and an influential official of her Yugoslav Left (JUL) party.

Mitrović founded Pink Media Group in the 1990s following the formation of the radio activities and later expansion into television. The company was re-registered on 25 April 2005, in accordance with new Serbian laws and regulations.

In June 2018, Pink Media Group sold to "Direct Media" its Montenegrin and Bosnian divisions – Pink M and Pink BH, respectively.

== Activities ==
Pink Media Group's range of activities encompass:

=== Radio ===
Radio Pink was started in 1993, covering only the Belgrade metropolitan area. The premise behind the radio was to focus on music programming. No news is broadcast.

=== Television ===
Pink TV is the leading commercial television station in Serbia. Founded in 1994 and covering initially only the Belgrade area, the station later achieved countrywide reach by the late 1990s. In 1998, Pink TV achieved the leading position in the market. Pink TV's emphasis is on light entertainment programming: movies, sitcoms, music variety shows, talk shows, reality shows and news.

=== Satellite television ===
Pink Media Group provides production content for two global satellite channels (Pink Extra and Pink Plus) broadcast to subscribers in Europe, Australia and North America. There are nine direct-to-home (DTH) satellite channels that have been created in cooperation with Serbia's largest cable company, Serbia Broadband (SBB) although some content from Pink Extra and/or Pink Plus is available on the DTH channels. Pink Media Group provides content for these satellite channels from its own production (TV Pink) and well as content purchased from or co-produced with independent production companies.

=== Fashion TV Southeast Europe ===
In November 2008, Pink Media Group launched Fashion TV Southeast Europe (Fashion TV SEE or FTV SEE). Pink Media Group obtained the franchise rights, from Fashion TV International, for Bosnia and Herzegovina, Croatia, Macedonia, Montenegro, Serbia and Slovenia. This regional satellite channel is distributed through cable and DTH. Michel Adam Lisowski, the owner of Fashion TV International, attended the launch activities with senior Pink representatives including Zeljko Mitrovic in Belgrade, Ljubljana and Zagreb. Fashion TV SEE has a potential market reach of more than 20 million viewers.

=== Film production ===
PFI Studios (opened in 2007), a division of Pink Media Group, consists currently of eight sound stages that have been designed and built to attract international productions, primarily American and West European. A ninth sound stage, planned for completion in 2011, will be one of the largest in Europe. In addition to the sound stages, the studio complex consists of administrative office buildings, warehouses and a back lot (12.5 hectares), all located in Šimanovci just 15 minutes outside of Belgrade. PFI Studios provides full production support in addition to studio infrastructure to international film projects. To date, productions such as Lockout and The Raven have been shot there.

PFI Studios has also co-produced Serbian films that have achieved local box office acclaim: Promeni me (Change Me), Četvrti čovek (The Fourth Man), Čitulja za Eskobara (Obituary for Escobar), and Zona mrtvih (Zone of the Dead).

== Channels ==
=== TV ===
==== Terrestrial ====
- Pink TV – Serbia

==== Satellite and cable ====
Specialized cable television channels:

- Pink Plus – Based in Vienna, Austria
- Pink BH – Based in Sarajevo, Bosnia and Herzegovina
- Pink M – Based in Podgorica, Montenegro
- Pink Extra – Broadcasts programs from Pink BH
- RED TV
- VESTI TV
- INSTA TV
- Pink Premium – Broadcasts foreign movies
- Pink Movies – Broadcasts foreign action movies
- Pink Romance – Broadcasts foreign romance movies
- Pink Sci-Fi & Fantasy – Broadcasts foreign sci-fi movies
- Pink Action – Broadcasts foreign action movies
- Pink Thriller – Broadcasts foreign thriller movies
- Pink Crime & Mystery
- Pink Classic – Broadcasts foreign classic movies
- Pink Western – Broadcasts foreign western movies
- Pink Horror – Broadcasts foreign horror movies
- Pink Comedy – Broadcasts foreign comedy movies
- Pink World Cinema – Broadcasts foreign movies
- Pink Film – Broadcasts domestic movies
- Pink Family – Broadcasts foreign series
- Pink Soap
- Pink Serije – Broadcasts domestic series
- Pink Koncert
- Pink Hits
- Pink Hits 2
- Pink N Roll
- Pink Music
- Pink Music 2
- Pink Folk
- Pink Folk 2
- Pink Show
- City Play
- Bravo Music
- Pink Pedia
- Pink Fashion
- Pink Style
- Pink Kuvar
- Pink Super Kids
- Pink Kids
- Pink Zabava
- Pink World
- Erotic
- Erotic 2
- Erotic 3
- Erotic 4
- Erotic 5
- Erotic 6
- Erotic 7
- Erotic 8
- Pink Reality

=== Radio ===
- Radio Pink – Able to be heard all over the world via satellite and internet
- Red Radio
- WTF Radio

==== Film production ====
- PFI Studios

== Subsidiaries ==
=== Active assets ===
The following is a list of subsidiary companies of Pink Media Group (as of 31 December 2023):

- Pink Ugostiteljstvo d.o.o. Beograd
- Pink Films International Studios (PFI Studious) d.o.o. Šimanovci
- Pink Library d.o.o. Beograd
- Global Digital Agency d.o.o. Beograd
- Pink Research & Development Center (PR-DC) d.o.o. Šimanovci
- S Choice Food d.o.o. Beograd
- Red Network d.o.o. Beograd
- Apollon Media d.o.o. Beograd
- Red Media Group d.o.o. Beograd
- RTV Centar d.o.o. Beograd
- Teatar Odeon d.o.o. Beograd
- Help Tim d.o.o. Beograd
- Pink Media M d.o.o., Podgorica, Montenegro
- Pink Media BH d.o.o., Sarajevo, Bosnia & Herzegovina

=== Former assets ===
- Pink M (2002–2018)
- Pink BH (2003–2018)
- Pink 15 (2010–2012)
- Pink Si (2010–2012)
- FTV SEE d.o.o. Beograd
