= Desingerica =

Serbian rapper

Desingerica (Desinger) Десингерица
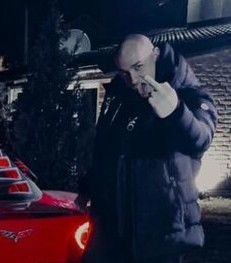

Background information
- Born: Dragomir Despić; 8 February 1993 (age 33); Belgrade, Serbia, FR Yugoslavia
- Genres: Trap; Serbian hip hop
- Occupations: Rapper; music video director; singer; songwriter
- Instruments: Vocals
- Years active: 2022–present
- Label: Desingerica (IDJTunes)
- Spouse: Nevena Brkljač (m. 2021)

Dragomir Despić (Serbian Cyrillic: Драгомир Деспић; born 8 February 1993), better known by his stage name Desingerica (Serbian Cyrillic: Десингерица) or shortly Desinger, is a Serbian rapper and director.

== Biography ==
Despić was born on 8 February 1993 in Belgrade, Serbia, where he was also raised. During his youth, he had a promising basketball career. Since 2019, he has been working as a tattoo artist.

Desinger began his music career in 2022 with the release of the single "Kucci Kucci," a collaboration with fellow rapper Lule Pljugica.

In June 2023, Desinger performed at Belgrade Music Week, attracting a crowd of over 10,000 attendees.

In August 2023, Draško Stanivuković banned Desinger from performing in Banja Luka due to a controversial on-stage act where he tapped audience members on the head with his shoe.

== Discography ==
- Kucci Kucci (ft. Lule Pljugica) (2022)
- Pistacc (ft. Lule Pljugica and Lacku) (2022)
- Balkanacc (ft. Lule Pljugica) (2022)
- Tuckavacc (ft. Lule Pljugica) (2022)
- Praccka (ft. Lule Pljugica) (2022)
- Ficcni (ft. Lule Pljugica) (2023)
- Novacc (ft. Lule Pljugica) (2023)
- Merccedecc (ft. Lule Pljugica, Đekson and Coja) (2023)
- Recci (ft. Lule Pljugica) (2023)
- Djuskavacc (ft. Lule Pljugica) (2023)
- Flecc (ft. Lule Pljugica) (2023)
- Ccokolada (2023)
- Ccuti (ft. Zera) (2023)
- Skakavacc (2024)
- Penetraccia (ft. Đekson) (2024)
- Rendalicca (2024)
- Ccapela (2024)
- Ccrno (ft. Pajak and Zera) (2024)
- Mrkavacc (2024)
- Pumpalicca (ft. Đekson) (2025)
- Cocctel (ft. Napoleon and Frantz) (2025)
- Cchap Cchap (2025)
- Devedeseticce (2025)
- Folkicc (2025)
- Medovacca (2026)
- Ccrevo (ft. Đani) (2026)
- Ccucla (2026)
- Narodnjacc (2026)
- Ccirke (ft. Đekson) (2026)
