= Yugoslav Radio Television =

National public broadcaster of the SFR Yugoslavia

Yugoslav Radio Television Jugoslavenska radiotelevizija Југословенска радиотелевизија
- Official logo

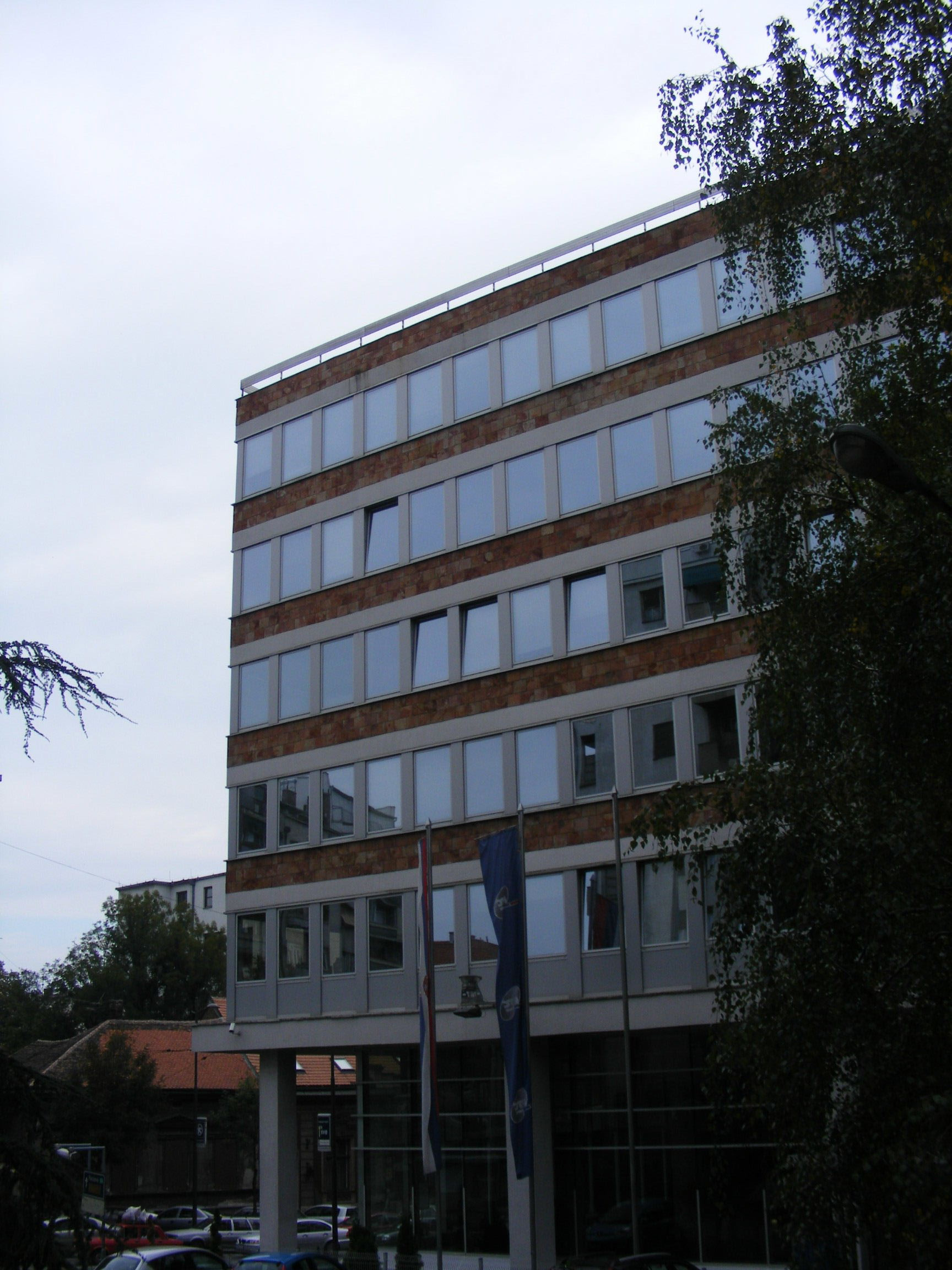
- Former JRT headquarters, now RTS headquarters, in Belgrade (2007)
- Type: Broadcast radio and television
- Country: Yugoslavia
- Availability: National; International
- Founded: 1956
- Headquarters: Takovska 10, Belgrade, Yugoslavia
- Broadcast area: Yugoslavia
- Owner: Government of Yugoslavia
- Launch date: 1956
- Dissolved: 1992
- Affiliation: European Broadcasting Union
- Language: Serbo-Croatian; Macedonian; Slovene; Albanian; Bulgarian; Czech; Greek; locally Hungarian; Romanian; Ruthenian; Slovak; Turkish; English; French; Italian; German; Russian

Yugoslav Radio Television (Jugoslavenska radiotelevizija/Југословенска радиотелевизија or Jugoslavenska radio-televizija/Југословенска радио-телевизија; JRT/ЈРТ) was the national public broadcasting system in the SFR Yugoslavia. It consisted of eight subnational radio and television broadcast centers with each one headquartered in one of the six constituent republics and two autonomous provinces of Yugoslavia.

== History ==
JRT was one of the founding members of the European Broadcasting Union, and SFR Yugoslavia was the only socialist country among its founding members.

Among other activities, JRT organized the Yugoslav national final for the Eurovision Song Contest and broadcast both events for the Yugoslav audience.

Each television center created its own programming independently, and some of them operated several channels. The system dissolved during the breakup of Yugoslavia in the early 1990s when most republics became independent countries. As a result, the once subnational broadcasting centers became public broadcasters of the newly independent states, with altered names:

Federal unit	HQ	Established as	TV launch	Present-day broadcaster
SR Bosnia and Herzegovina	Sarajevo	RTV Sarajevo	1 June 1961	Radio and Television of Bosnia and Herzegovina (BHRT)
SR Croatia	Zagreb	RTV Zagreb	15 May 1956	Croatian Radiotelevision (HRT)
SR Macedonia	Skopje	RTV Skopje	14 December 1964	Macedonian Radio-Television (MRT)
SR Montenegro	Titograd	RTV Titograd	4 May 1964	Radio Television of Montenegro (RTCG)
SR Serbia	Belgrade	RTV Belgrade	23 August 1958	Radio Television of Serbia (RTS)
SR Slovenia	Ljubljana	RTV Ljubljana	11 November 1958	Radio-Television Slovenia (RTVSLO)
SAP Kosovo	Pristina	RTV Priština	1975	Radio Television of Kosovo (RTK)^{[a]}
SAP Vojvodina	Novi Sad	RTV Novi Sad	26 November 1975	Radio Television of Vojvodina (RTV)

a. RTV Pristina still legally exists in Serbia as a dormant entity due to ongoing territorial dispute

== Frequencies ==
JRT TV frequencies:

- 1956: Zagreb 1
- 1958: Beograd 1
- 1958: Ljubljana 1
- 1961: Sarajevo 1
- 1964: Titograd 1
- 1964: Skopje 1
- 1970: Ljubljana 2
- 1971: Koper – Capodistria
- 1971: Titograd 2
- 1971: Beograd 2
- 1972: Zagreb 2
- 1975: Novi Sad
- 1975: Priština
- 1977: Sarajevo 2
- 1978: Skopje 2
- 1979: Split (trials; became a RTV Center of RTVZ in 1980)
- 1988: Zagreb 3, satellite program relays (usually Super Channel and Sky Channel); full program commenced in 1989 as Z3
- 1989: Beograd 3K, same as Zagreb 3; full program from July 1989
- 1989: 3P Novi Sad (time-sharing with Beograd 3)
- 1989: Sarajevo 3, same as Beograd 3K and Zagreb 3
- 1991: Novi Sad Plus
- 1991: Skopje 3, same as Beograd 3K and Zagreb 3
- 1991: Titograd 3K, same as all third channels mentioned

== See also ==
- Yutel (1990–1992), newscast
- Udruženje javnih radija i televizija (2001–2006, Serbia and Montenegro)
