= Dušan Mitević =

Serbian journalist

- Born: 3 February 1938; Pljevlja, Kingdom of Yugoslavia
- Died: 30 May 2003 (aged 65); Belgrade, Serbia and Montenegro
- Occupation: Journalist

Dušan Mitević (Serbian Cyrillic: Душан Митевић; 3 February 1938 – 30 May 2003) was a Serbian journalist.

From 1989–91 he was director of Radio Television Belgrade (RTB, later renamed Radio Television of Serbia in 1992), Serbia's public broadcaster, during the breakup of Yugoslavia and the ascent to power of Slobodan Milošević. He resigned from the post following the violent March 1991 Belgrade protests which had been organized by opposition parties against the increasingly propagandist content of state-controlled media.

Mitević made a statement about the nature of state media in Serbia under Milošević's guidance: "The things that happened at state TV: warmongering, things we can admit to now: false information, biased reporting. That went directly from Milošević to the head of TV". He appeared on the British TV series "The Death of Yugoslavia."
