= RTS 1 (Serbian TV channel) =

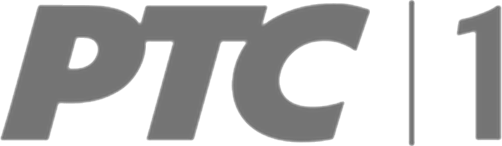
- Country: Serbia
- Headquarters: Belgrade

Programming
- Language: Serbian
- Picture format: 1080i (16:9) (HDTV)

Ownership
- Owner: RTS
- Sister channels: RTS 2 RTS 3

History
- Launched: 23 August 1958; 67 years ago
- Former names: Televizija Beograd (1958–1971); TVB 1 (1971–1992); RTS B1 (1992–1995)

Availability

Terrestrial
- Digital: Channel 1

RTS 1 (Serbian: РТС 1, romanized: RTS jedan), known as RTS Program One (Serbian: Први програм РТС-а, romanized: Prvi program RTS-a), or Prvi (Serbian: Први), is a Serbian television channel that is part of Radio Television of Serbia (RTS). It was established on 23 August 1958 as the first television station in Serbia.

== History ==
RTS 1 was the first television channel founded in the territory of Serbia. The channel began broadcasting on 23 August 1958 at 8:55 am, under the name Televizija Beograd, as part of the Yugoslav Radio Television. Its first programme was the opening of the 2nd International Fair of Technics and Technical Achievements. When TVB Program Two was launched on 31 December 1971, the new name for Program One became TVB 1. With the dissolution of Yugoslavia, the channel received its current name on 1 January 1992, when Radio Television of Serbia was established.

The final of the 2008 Eurovision Song Contest, held in Belgrade and produced by RTS, attracted a record high audience of 4,560,000 viewers. At the time, nine out of the ten most watched programs on Serbian television were from RTS' channels.

== See also ==
- RTS 2, second channel launched in 1971
- RTS 3, the third channel since 2008
- Radio Television of Serbia
