= Pink (Serbia) =

Media company in Serbia

- Type: Free-to-air radio station and television channel
- Country: Serbia
- Availability: Serbia
- Market share: 16.9% (2021)
- Headquarters: Belgrade, Serbia
- Owner: Pink Media Group
- Parent: Pink International Company
- Launch date: Radio: 24 December 1993; 32 years ago; Television: 16 September 1994; 31 years ago
- Picture format: 1080i (HDTV)
- Affiliations: Pink BH; Pink M; Pink Family; Pink Soap; Pink Kids; Pink Super Kids; Pink Reality; Pink Action
- Official website: www.pink.rs www.rtvpink.com
- Language: Serbian

Pink is a private-owned national brand of radio stations and TV channels in Serbia. It is the flagship brand of the Belgrade-based Pink Media Group, which is owned by Zoran Drašković and Željko Mitrović.

== History ==
TV Pink was founded by media mogul Željko Mitrović and launched on 16 September 1994. It has used the splat as the basis of its logo from the beginning, with the wordmark being initially set in the Cartoon Bold font.

Pink has more than 60 cable channels, ranging from Pink Kids and Pink Music to Pink Erotica.

During the 1990s, the station provided turbo-folk music along with political programming that reflected the nationalist ideals of the period. By the end of the decade, it had become the leading commercial television station in the country. It maintained close ties with the ruling regime of the time and until 21 April 1999, it broadcast its programme from the Ušće building, the same building as the premises of the Socialist Party of Serbia (SPS).

Originally registered as a trademark in August 2001, a new logo premiered on 12 February 2004 on-screen.

In 2009, it began broadcasting reality shows such as Big Brother.

A major change to the logo occurred in September 2012. Although the shape of the splat itself has remained, it gained a 3D effect and the wordmark became lowercase for the first time.

In 2018 Mitrović bought a 10% stake in Pink TV held by the company Direct Media, making him the sole owner of the channel. Pink International sold the national channels Pink BH in Bosnia and Herzegovina and Pink M in Montenegro to United Media.
