= Željko Mitrović =

Serbian businessman and media magnate (born 1967)

- Жељко Митровић
- Born: Željko Mitrović; 31 May 1967 (age 59); Belgrade, SR Serbia, Yugoslavia
- Occupations: Businessman; Media proprietor
- Spouses: Sonja Mitrović (m. 1990; div. 1994) Milica Mitrović (m. 1995)
- Children: 5

Željko Mitrović (born 31 May 1967) is a Serbian entrepreneur, media executive, and CEO of Pink Media Group.

== Early life ==
Mitrović was born on 31 May 1967 in Belgrade, then part of the SR Serbia, within Yugoslavia.

== Career ==
In 1988, Mitrović founded one of Yugoslavia's first music recording studios. He opened a radio station in 1993 and established TV Pink in 1994. He later founded the music publishing house City Records. After launching the satellite program, Mitrović launched TV Pink Montenegro in 2002 and Pink BH in Bosnia and Herzegovina in 2003.

Mitrović included a subsidiary in the Pink International Company: the PFI—Pink Films International, a film production complex intended for commercial film and television production. In May 2008, the Los Angeles Times wrote about Mitrović's new project, a 452,000 square feet (42,000 m^{2}) film studio complex.

In 2004, Mitrović founded Air Pink, a business jet airline, one of seven companies under Pink Media Group. They extended their 11-airplane fleet with three new Cessna XLS+ aircraft. The company specialized in VIP and corporate aviation services. The airline was grounded in February 2024, following the suspension of its air operator certificate. Air Pink has since been rebranded as ImperialJet, following a 68% stake acquired by companies affiliated with Abed El Jaouni.

Mitrović established the Pink Digital Company, a subsidiary of the Pink Media Group, to develop digital products and platforms. The company's Pink Digital Media System developed applications such as Pink.rs and KlikTV.

== Honors and awards ==
In 2006, Mitrović was awarded 'Manager of the Year' by the Belgrade Chamber of Commerce (BCC) for his role in the growth and development of the Pink Media Group.
