= Zdravko Šotra =

Serbian film director (1933-2025)

- Здравко Шотра
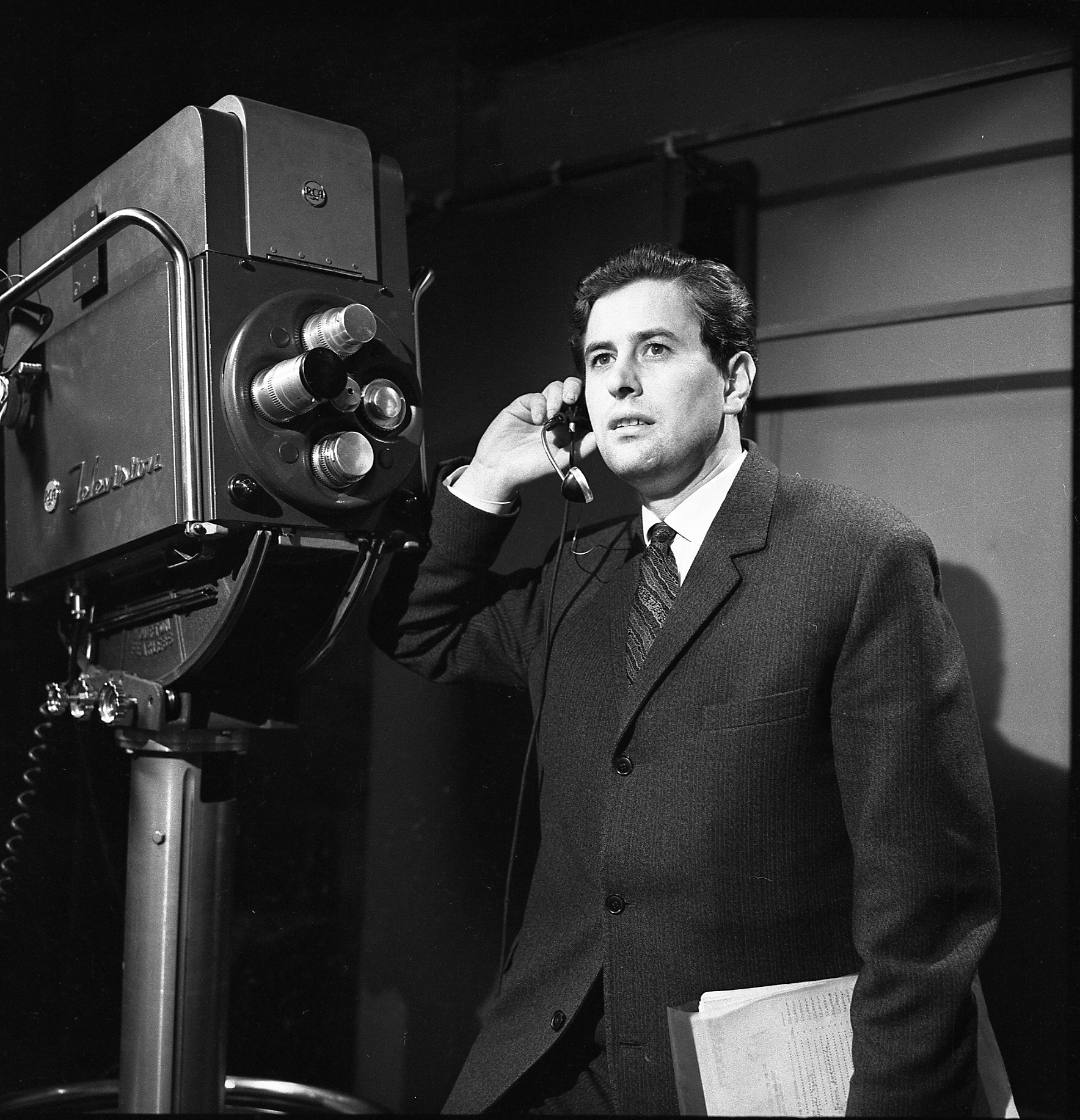
- Born: 13 February 1933; Kozice, Littoral Banovina, Kingdom of Yugoslavia
- Died: 8 October 2025 (aged 92); Belgrade, Serbia
- Occupations: Film and television director
- Years active: 1950s–2025
- Spouse: Nikica Marinović (m. 1970)
- Children: 1

Zdravko Šotra (Serbian Cyrillic: Здравко Шотра; 13 February 1933 – 8 October 2025) was a Serbian film and television director and screenwriter. He is known for having directed the films Zona Zamfirova, Boj na Kosovu, Šešir profesora Vujića, Santa Maria della Salute among others, as well as television mini-series.

== Early life ==
Šotra was born in the village of Kozice, near Stolac (modern-day Bosnia and Herzegovina), into an ethnic Serb family as the seventh child of Mara and Đorđe Šotra. As a child his family moved to Kosovo just prior to the outbreak of World War II, where he would grow up.

== Career ==
Šotra graduated from the Faculty of Dramatic Arts, University of Arts in Belgrade with a degree in film directing. He began his professional career at TV Belgrade, working there since its inception.

His film Zona Zamfirova (2002) was watched by a record 1.2 million people in Serbia.

He directed several television mini-series based on novels by Mir-Jam: Ranjeni orao, Greh njene majke, Nepobedivo srce and Samac u braku.

In his films, he frequently portrayed historical events from Serbian history, which had a considerable influence on the way these events are perceived in Serbian popular culture. Notable among his works are the documentary Where the Yellow Lemon Blooms and the feature film Battle of Kosovo.

== Personal life and death ==
Šotra was married to the former beauty queen Nikica Marinović. Together they had a son, Marko, who is a television director employed at the Serbian state television.

He was a fan of Red Star Belgrade.

Šotra died on 8 October 2025, at the age of 92.

== Filmography ==
Films

- Osvajanje slobode (1979)
- Šesta brzina (1981)
- Idemo dalje (1982)
- Igmanski marš (1983)
- Držanje za vazduh (1985)
- Braća po materi (1988)
- Boj na Kosovu (1989)
- Dnevnik uvreda 1993 (1994)
- Barking at the Stars (1998)
- Zona Zamfirova (2002)
- Pljačka Trećeg rajha (2004)
- Ivkova slava (2005)
- Gde cveta limun žut (2006)
- Kneževina Srbija (2008)
- Kraljevina Srbija (2008)
- Šešir profesora Vujića (2012) (Professor Kosta Vujic's Hat)
- Santa Maria della Salute (2016)

Series

- Više od igre (1976)
- Gde cveta limun žut (2006)
- Ranjeni orao (2008–2009)
- Greh njene majke (2009–2010)
- Nepobedivo srce (2011–2012)
- Alexander of Yugoslavia (2021)
