= Ja imam talenat! series 4 =

Ja imam talenat!
- Series 4
- Hosted by: Ivana Bajić and Vladimir Aleksić
- Judges: Ivan Tasovac; Nataša Ninković; Ivan Bosiljčić

Release
- Original network: RTS
- Original release: 18 November 2012

Series chronology
- ← Previous; Series 3

Ja imam talenat! 2012–13 is a series of the Serbian edition of the Got Talent franchise. It is the third instalment of the series. Its applications were opened on the night of the final of the third series. Over five thousand acts have performed in front of the producers, while four hundred of them got to perform for the judges and live audience.

After Mili and Mina left the judging panel, they were replaced with Nataša Ninković and Ivan Bosiljčić, making Tasovac the only judge on the panel who has been the part of the show since the first series. For the first time, the auditions are moved from Terazije Theatre to the National Theatre. The series premiered on 18 November.

== Auditions ==
Over five thousand applicants performed in front of the producers in late August, after which the selected four hundred got to perform in front of the judges and a live audience. Most of the candidates were from Serbia; some of other candidates came from Montenegro, Croatia, Brazil, Mexico and Ukraine. Auditions were broadcast in nine episodes. The last episode also featured judges deciding the final cut and selecting forty acts that would proceed to the live semi-finals. This year, the acts were informed if they got through to semi-finals via phone calls, that judges themselves made - some of the reactions were filmed and broadcast.
