= Ja imam talenat! series 3 =

Ja imam talenat!
- Series 3
- Hosted by: Ivana Bajić and Vladimir Aleksić
- Judges: Ivan Tasovac; Mina Lazarević; Aleksandar Milić Mili

Release
- Original network: RTS
- Original release: 20 November 2011 – 4 March 2012

Series chronology
- ← Previous; Series 2 Next → Series 4

Ja imam talenat! 2011-12 was a series of the Serbian edition of the Got Talent franchise. It was the third series broadcast in Serbia.

For the first time since the show's debut, the judging panel was altered – Danica Maksimović was replaced with Mina Lazarević. The press reported that Maksimović and the producers couldn't reach an agreement on her fee, so it was decided that Mina would take her place.

The first episode of the series was aired on 20 November 2011. In addition to the weekly auditions show, during the workdays a companion show is broadcast.

This season, the logo was changed; the new logo looked like the one used for the fifth series of the British version of the show, with a slightly altered colour scheme.

== Auditions ==
Over 4000 auditionees performed in front of the judges in September 2011, in Terazije Theatre. Prior to this, contestants had to audition in front of the production team. For this season, some of the contestant came from countries other than Serbia, including a singer from Tunisia, and a male oriental dancer from Croatia.

== Semi-finals ==
Semi-finals are broadcast live from RTS' studios in Filmski Grad. After all the acts perform, there is a 15 minute break, when the judges are interviewed and guests perform, during which viewers can vote. This year the semifinal shows are broadcast without ad breaks.

Key	X Buzzed out	✔ Judges' choice	Won the public vote	Won the judges' vote	Lost the judges' vote

=== Semi-final 1 ===
Aired on: 29 January 2012

Order	Artist	Act	Buzzes and judges' choices		
Order	Artist	Act	Mili	Ivan	Mina
1	Jelena Urosević	Violinist and composer			
2	Katarina i Stevan Gojković	Serbian traditional singers			
3	Sanja i Uroš	Dancers			
4	Milena Damnjanovic	Singer			
5	Dejana Bajic	Ballerina	✔	✔	✔
6	Katarina Krznarić	Cabaret performance			
7	Marko Milanovic	Opera singer			
8	Swing	Dance troupe			

Guest performer: Milica i Nenad

=== Semi-final 2 ===
Aired on: 5 February 2012

Order	Artist	Act	Buzzes and judges' choices		
Order	Artist	Act	Mili	Ivan	Mina
1	Pogrešila roda	Rock band	✔	✔	
2	Emilija Đonin	Singer			
3	Vjekoslav Didović	Oriental dancer			
4	Marija Serdar	Singer			
5	Mina i Marko	Classical singer and composer			
6	Boris Subotić	Singer			✔
7	Dance Factory	Dance troupe			
8	Milan i Manja	Alternative Juggling and bartendering			

Guest performer: Kiki Lesendrić i Piloti

=== Semi-final 3 ===
Aired on: 12 February 2012

Order	Artist	Act	Buzzes and judges' choices		
Order	Artist	Act	Mili	Ivan	Mina
1	Marija Lazić	Singer and pianist			
2	Dijana i Davor	Serbian folk dancers			
3	Jovana Jokić	Singer			
4	Elektra	Latin dance troupe			
5	Dejan Drakulić	Singer			
6	Glas ne žice	Glee club	✔	✔	✔
7	Saša Trajković	Singer			
8	Dream team	Dance troupe			

Guest performer: Zemlja gruva - "Najlepše želje"

=== Semi-final 4 ===
Aired on: 19 February 2012

Order	Artist	Act	Buzzes and judges' choices		
Order	Artist	Act	Mili	Ivan	Mina
1	Irina Bogdanović	Baton twirling			
2	Nikola Mijomanović	Break dancer			
3	Tijana Vlajkovic	Singer			
4	Street Dance	Dance crew			✔
5	Anja Mihajlović	Singer			
6	Dejan Ćosić	Comb player and singer			
7	Infinity Quintet	String quartet	✔	✔	
8	Katarina Dumančić	singer			

Guest performer: Eva Braun

=== Semi-final 5 ===
Aired on: 26 February 2012

Order	Artist	Act	Buzzes and judges' choices		
Order	Artist	Act	Mili	Ivan	Mina
1	Natalija and Petar	Singer and guitarist			
2	Forty	Rapper			
3	Fly	Dancers			
4	Bojana and Nikola	Gusle and Accordion duo			
5	Stefan Lukovic	Singer			
6	Tatjana Tatić	Ballet dancer			
7	Danilo and Jelena	Singers			
8	Bojana Stamenov	Singer	✔	✔	✔

Guest performer: Negative; Sergej Trifunović

== Final ==
Aired on: 4 March 2012

Key	Winner	Runner-up

Order	Artist	Act
1	Marko Milanović	Opera singer
2	Emilija Đonin	Singer
3	Glas ne žice	Glee club
4	Dejana Bajić	Ballerina
5	Infinity Quintet	String quartet
6	Katarina Dumančić	Singer
7	Bojana and Nikola	Gusle and Accordion duo
8	Pogrešila roda	Rock band
9	Bojana Stamenov	Singer
10	Dream team	Dance troupe
