= Professor Kosta Vujic's Hat =

- Film poster
- Serbian: Šešir profesora Koste Vujića
- Directed by: Zdravko Šotra
- Written by: Milovan Vitezović; Zdravko Šotra
- Based on: Šešir profesora Koste Vujića by Milovan Vitezović
- Starring: Aleksandar Berček; Miloš Biković
- Release date: 1 February 2012
- Running time: 121 minutes
- Country: Serbia
- Language: Serbian

Professor Kosta Vujic's Hat (Serbian: Шешир професора Косте Вујића / Šešir profesora Koste Vujića) is a 2012 Serbian film directed by Zdravko Šotra. The film was based on a novel written by Milovan Vitezović.

== Plot ==
The protagonist of the film is professor Kosta Vujić who in the mid-19th century taught an extraordinarily talented generation of gymnasium students, some of whom would go on to become prominent members of the Serbian society and eventually historically significant figures.

== Cast ==
- Aleksandar Berček - Professor Kosta Vujić
- Miloš Biković - Mihailo Petrović Alas
- Aleksandar Radojičić - Milorad Mitrović
- Ljubomir Bulajić - Jovan Cvijić
- Andrija Daničić - Jakov Jaša Prodanović
- Mateja Popović - Pavle Popović
- Branimir Brstina - Professor Zečević
- Vojin Ćetković - Principal Kozarac
- Dragan Jovanović - Professor Stanić
- Tamara Aleksić - Mirjana Marinković
- Marko Bacović - Minister Marinković
- Ivan Bosiljčić - Professor Mokranjac
- Vesna Čipčić - Minister's wife
- Dragomir Čumić - Old principal Milosavljević
- Nikola Ranđelović - Ljubomir Stojanović
- Igor Đorđević - Captain Mišić
