= Ana Stjelja =

Serbian writer, translator

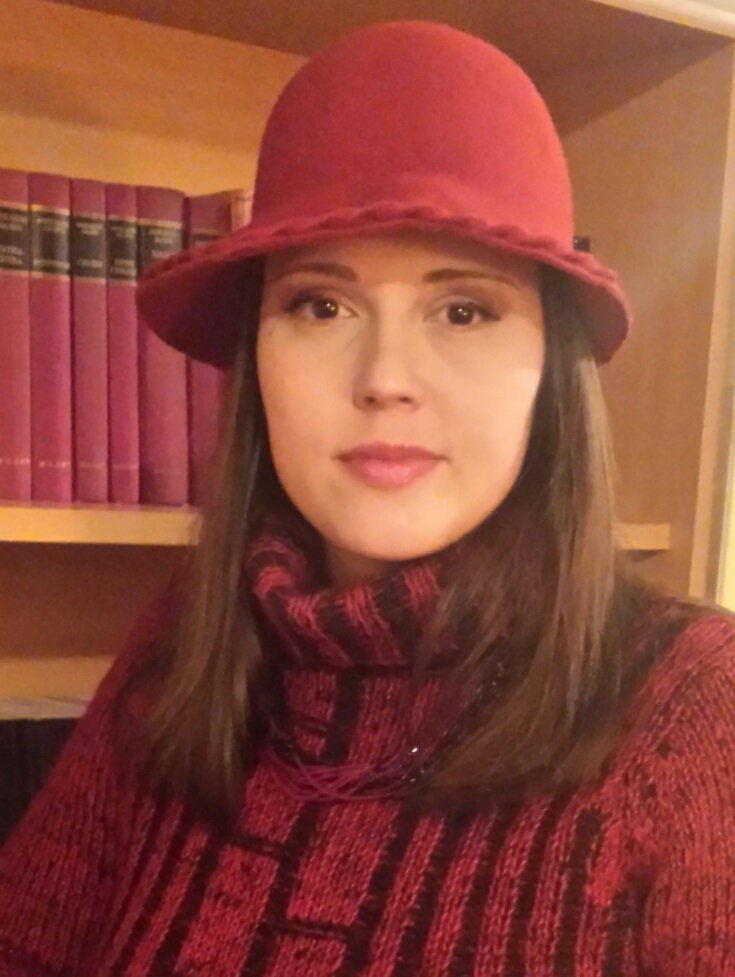
Ana Stjelja

Ana Stjelja (Belgrade, August 14, 1982) is a Serbian writer, literary translator, orientalist, independent scientific researcher, journalist and cultural activist. During her writing career, she has translated or edited books on various topics such as religion, history of literature and Sufism. She was a two-time candidate for the Award of the city of Belgrade for cultural contributions. She is currently the Editor-in-chief of Alia Mundi magazine for cultural diversity. She lives in Muscat (Oman).

== Biography ==
Ana Stjelja was born on 14 August 1982 in Belgrade, (Serbia). After finishing elementary school and graduating from Fifth Belgrade Gymnasium in Belgrade she enrolled in the Faculty of Philology at Belgrade University. In 2005 she graduated from Turkish language and Literature. In 2009 she defended her master thesis titled "The Human and Divine Elements in the works of Mawlānā Jalāl ad-Dīn Rūmī and Yunus Emre”.

At the same Faculty, she defended her doctoral thesis titled "Traditional and modern elements in the work of Jelena Dimitrijević". She writes poetry, short stories, haiku, aphorisms, poems for children, essays, travels. She also translates from English, Spanish, Turkish and Portuguese. Her poems in Portuguese have been published in a famous Brazilian literary portal. Her poems in English have been translated into the Croatian language and published in Balkan Literary Herald magazine. Her poems in Spanish are published in two anthologies of poems published in Madrid in 2007. Many of her works have been published in various Serbian magazines and journals. She is a regular collaborator of the Nur magazine, the official publication of Cultural Center of the Islamic Republic of Iran in Belgrade. She is the creator and the editor of the website dedicated to Serbian writer Jelena Dimitrijević. She is among four Serbian writers who became the members of World Poets Society.

== Published works ==
=== Author's books ===
- collection of poems "Moira", (2002)
- collection of poems "Atavi", (2004)
- collection of poetry and essays "Eden & Had", (2006)
- collection of haiku "Three Geishas/ Tri Gejše", (2008)
- collectionof poems for children "One step to the rainbow/ Na korak do duge", (2009)
- monography "Poets of the Universe: Mawlānā Jalāl ad-Dīn Rūmīand Yunus Emre/ Pesnici Univerzuma... Rumi i Emre", (2013)
- collection of short stories "How I became a bird/Kako sam postao ptica", (2015)
- collection of poems "Lira Divina", (2015)
- collection of aphorisms "Oximoron/Oksimoron", (2016)
- collection of poems and haiku "POESIA: coleção de poemas e haikais" /POETRY: a collection of poems and haiku, (in Portuguese), (2016)

=== Translation books ===
- Federico García Lorca "The shadow of my soul", (translation from Spanish to Serbian), (2008)
- Pablo Neruda "The land in You", (translation from Spanish to Serbian) (2008, 2010)
- Yunus Emre "The nightingale of love", (translation from Turkish to Serbian, (2010, 2016)
- Federico García Lorca "Divan of Tamarit",(translation from Spanish to Serbian), (2014)
- William de Mille "The Deceivers / Obmanjivači", (translation from English to Serbian), (2016)
- Jelena J. Dimitrijević "Une Vision:poème/Priviđenje:poema" (translation from French to Serbian), (2016)

=== Edited books ===
- The republished version of the book of poems by Serbian poet Jovan Jovanović Zmaj "Oriental pearl" - collection of Persian, Turkish and Azerbaijani poetry /Istočni biser: sakupljene pesme istočnjačkih pesnika, (2011)
- The republished version of the book of Jelena J. Dimitrijević "Une Vision:poème/Priviđenje:poema" (translation from French to Serbian), (2016)

== Memberships in Associations ==
- The Association of Writers of Serbia, (2007-)
- The Association of Literary Translators of Serbia, (2009-)
- The Society of Writers of Belgrade, (2015-)
- The Association of Journalists of Serbia, (2015-)
- International Federation of Journalists, (2016-)
