= Ranjeni orao (TV series) =

- Created by: Mir Jam
- Starring: Sloboda Mićalović Ćetković; Ivan Bosiljčić; Danica Maksimović; Dragan Nikolić; Lidija Vukićević; Marinko Madžgalj; Danijela Stajnfeld; Vojin Ćetković
- Country of origin: Serbia
- No. of seasons: 1
- No. of episodes: 17

Production
- Executive producer: Zdravko Šotra
- Running time: 55 minutes

Original release
- Network: RTS1
- Release: December 22, 2008 – January 15, 2009

Ranjeni orao (Serbian Cyrillic: Рањени орао, English: Wounded eagle) is a Serbian television show produced in 2008 and aired on RTS1 during late 2008 and early 2009. The 17-episode series is based on the 1936 novel of the same name by Serbian author Mir Jam. The show had unprecedented success, with the last episode averaging over 3 million viewers, making it the most watched Serbian television series ever made.

== Plot ==
Like the novel, the television series is based in the Kingdom of Yugoslavia between the two World Wars and centres around the love life of the young and naive protagonist, Anđelka Bojanić, a war orphan brought up by her protective aunt. After marrying a Montenegrin lawyer, she quickly realizes she has made a mistake. Having lost her virginity during her university years while on an excursion—a social taboo at the time—to her first love who supposedly later died before they were able to develop their relationship, her husband, who only learned of his liaison after marrying her, quickly divorces her. Anđelka relocates to Trebinje in order to start a new job and get away from idle gossip in Belgrade. In Trebinje, she meets new people she becomes close with, but also meets up with old friends and ghosts from her past. Several interwoven plot lines include Anđelka's childhood friend, Nenad Aleksić, now an aviator, and his family in Belgrade, and how their life circumstances and fate ultimately bring them together.

== Cast and crew ==
The television series was produced and adapted by the legendary Serbian producer and director Zdravko Šotra. The production company behind the series is Košutnjak Film. The major reason for the success of the show was mostly due to its writing, romantic style and drama, however it also received high praise due to the famous Serbian actors which appeared in the show. They included:

- Sloboda Mićalović Ćetković (protagonist) as Anđelka Bojanić
- Ivan Bosiljčić (Anđelka's new love and future husband) as Nenad Aleksić
- Vojin Ćetković (Anđelka's first husband) as Tomo Đurović
- Nenad Jezdić (Anđelka's first love) as Gojko Marić
- Nataša Ninković (Anđelka's friend) as Vukica Marić
- Marinko Madžgalj (Trebinje resident and Anđelka's love interest) as Safet
- Danica Maksimović (Anđelka's host in Trebinje) as Saveta
- Dragan Nikolić (Nenad's uncle) as Uglješa Knežević

== Ratings ==
The show received extremely positive critical reviews and outstanding ratings. The show's first episode, aired in December 2008, was watched by a respectable 1.5 million people. The show aired 4 times per week. Each episode saw a ratings increase. Soon after, newspapers and other media picked up on the massive success of the show. The final episode, with much fanfare, aired on January 15, 2009 was watched by 3,277,000 people, making it the most watched television show in Serbia to date.

Due to viewer requests, once the show ended, it was immediately reprised in primetime, making it the fastest encored show on RTS. In its reruns it also managed to produce extremely high ratings.

Because of its success as a television series, the 1936 novel was quickly reprinted and hit the bookshelves in book stores across Serbia. In 2009, a film was produced based on the book and series with all the original cast from the television show appearing in it.

== See also ==
- Radio Television of Serbia

Awards
New title	Serbian Oscar Of Popularity; TV Series of the Year; 2009	Succeeded by Selo gori, a baba se češlja
