= Milka Canić =

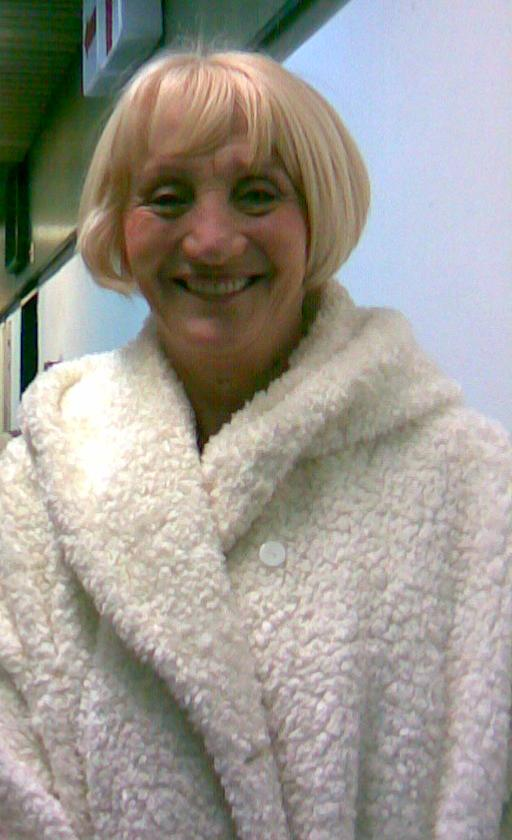
- Milka Canić
- Born: 18 July 1944; Belgrade, Yugoslavia
- Died: 19 October 2016 (aged 72); Belgrade, Serbia
- Occupations: Television journalist, academic

Milka Canić (Serbian Cyrillic: Милка Цанић; 18 July 1944 – 19 October 2016) was the supervisor of the Serbian TV quiz show "TV Slagalica" on RTS.

== Career ==
Canić graduated from the University of Belgrade Faculty of Philology and was a professor of the Serbian language at the gymnasium in Priština, at the military gymnasium in Belgrade, and at XV Belgrade gymnasium.

Canić worked for five years on RTS program "Srbija danas" (Serbia today), and after that she became part of "Slagalica" crew in the 90s, and gained enormous popularity in Serbia since then.

On 2008 Serbian parliamentary election Milka Canić was a candidate of the Democratic Party of Serbia (DSS).

== Death ==
Milka Canić died in Belgrade on 19 October 2016 after a long illness, aged 72.
