= Greh njene majke =

Serbian television series

Greh njene majke (The sin of her mother) is a Serbian television series filmed in 2009 based on the novel by Mir-Jam. It has been shown at Radio Television of Serbia from 20 November 2009 to 12 March 2010. The series is set in the time before the Second World War in Serbia. The series follows Neda, a young girl who remained tragically orphaned. Alone in the world, she begins to fight for a place in society and life trying to figure out what was her mother once did and why she has to pay her "sin".

== Roles ==
Glumac:	Uloga:
Ivana Jovanović	Neda
Ivan Bosiljčić	Bojan
Marija Vicković	Ranka
Siniša Ubović	Dušan
Miloš Đuričić	Svetislav
Vesna Stanojević	Vuka Perić
Marija Krulj	Meri
Slaviša Čurović	
Marinko Madžgalj	Kosta
Jasmina Avramović	Kostina majka
Maja Kolundžija	Gabrijela
Vojin Ćetković	Jovan
Ružica Sokić	Anica
Katarina Janković	Dušanka
Bojana Grabovac	Olga
Milan Vasić	Mitko
Nebojša Dugalić	Dobrivoje
Branislav Tomašević	Branko
Marko Milanović	Toša
Slobodan Roksandić	Ivan
Saša Joksimović	Lule
Tijana Čurović	Dunja
Tomo Kuruzović	poštar
