= Ja imam talenat! series 2 =

Ja imam talenat!
- Series 2
- Hosted by: Ivana Bajić and Vladimir Aleksić
- Judges: Ivan Tasovac; Danica Maksimović; Aleksandar Milić Mili
- Winner: Milica i Nenad

Release
- Original network: RTS
- Original release: 17 April – 26 July 2011

Series chronology
- Next → Series 3

The second season of Serbian talent show Ja imam talenat!, which was shot during the second half of 2010. Hosted by Vladimir Aleksić and Ivana Bajić, and judged by Ivan Tasovac, Danica Maksimović and Aleksandar Milić Mili. This was the first season that was broadcast on the Public Broadcasting Service of Serbia, RTS. The first episode was aired on 17 April 2011.

== Auditions ==
The producer auditions were held in the first part of 2011, in 4 cities: Belgrade, Novi Sad, Niš and Kragujevac. The number of acts that applied was higher than the previous year (over 4000). The auditions in front of the judges were held in late August and during the first days of September 2010, and all took place in Belgrade.
The variety of talents and acts is a lot bigger than the first season. Although most of the acts are singers and dancers, there was a fakir, some contortionist, comedians and other variety acts.

== Semi-finals ==
Top 40 acts that made the semi-finals were revealed on 5 June 2011.
Unlike the previous year, live shows are aired from Studio 8 - studio in suburban neighbourhood of Košutnjak, where most of the shows that are broadcast on RTS are recorded. Stage and the set are also different, less similar to staging of the British version of the show.
Two semifinals are aired per weekend, with 8 semi-finalists performing per show. After all the semi-finalists perform, lines are opened for 15 minutes, after which the votes are counted.

=== Semi-finalists ===
Key	Winner	Runner-up	Finalist	Semi-finalist (lost judges' or public vote)

Artist	Age(s)	Act	From	Semi	Position reached
Milica i Nenad	21, 22	Dancers (both are deaf)	Paraćin	2	Winner
Đurađ Đuričić	7	Drummer	Kraljevo	2	Runner-up
Anđela Nikolić		Accordion player	Ruma	3	Finalist
Draga Džinić		Opera singer	Niš	4	Finalist
Katarina Bogićević		Singer	Podgorica	4	Finalist
Tamara i Dušan		Singer and a guitar player		5	Finalist
Boris Lukman	14	Dancer/Michael Jackson tribute act	Belgrade	1	Finalist
Katarina Jovanović		Singer		5	Finalist
USB		Street dancers	Niš	3	Finalist
Kvartet Nevski	18-24	Clarinet quartet	Belgrade	1	Finalist
Just 2 Cool		Street dancers		3	Semi-finalist
Studio Alektik		Musicians		5	Semi-finalist
Svetlana Vukomanović	27	Singer	Čačak	2	Semi-finalist
Rade Zdravković		Whistling (can play any song by whistling)		4	Semi-finalist
Jeleče	15	Traditional/etno singers	Belgrade	1	Semi-finalist
Naser Alitović	33	Singer	Belgrade	1	Semi-finalist
Miša Mladenović		Fakir and contortionist		3	Semi-finalist
Julijana Živković	20	Singer	Sremska Mitrovica	1	Semi-finalist
Miodrag Spasić		Singer		5	Semi-finalist
Aleksandar Mrakić		Singing	Bačka Palanka	4	Semi-finalist
Igor Srećković	19	Beatboxing	Kostolac	2	Semi-finalist
Pozitiv		Variety dance act		1	Semi-finalist
Sonja Škorić		Singing		5	Semi-finalist
Grubb Music		Boy band		4	Semi-finalist
Katarina Đorđević - Frida		(Female) rapper		3	Semi-finalist
Luka Živković		Ballroom dancer		5	Semi-finalist
Fenix		Dancers		4	Semi-finalist
Siniša Marček	33	One man band	Belgrade	2	Semi-finalist
Maris		Street dance		5	Semi-finalist
Erin's Fiddle		Irish dancers		5	Semi-finalist
Miroslav Milanović	46	Opera singer	Belgrade	1	Semi-finalist
Evil smile		Rock band		4	Semi-finalist
Biljana Drecun	18	Belly dancer	Podgorica	1	Semi-finalist
Željko i Srđan	29, 28	Break dancers	Belgrade	4	Semi-finalist
Play Dance Studio		Jazz Ballet dancers	Novi Sad	2	Semi-finalist
Iva i Sara		Singer and a guitar player		3	Semi-finalist
Petar Bošković	23	Singer	Niš	2	Semi-finalist
Erhan Jusufi	45	Freestyle dancer	Skopje	2	Semi-finalist
Ivana Maksimović		Singer		3	Semi-finalist
Risto Kraćković		Magician		3	Semi-finalist

Key	X Buzzed out	✔ Judges' choice	Won the public vote	Won the judges' vote	Lost the judges' vote

=== Semi-final 1 ===
Order	Artist	Act	Buzzes and judges' choices		
Order	Artist	Act	Mili	Danica	Ivan
1	Naser Alitović	Singer			
2	Pozitiv	Variety dance act			
3	Kvartet Nevski	Clarinet quartet	✔	✔	✔
4	Julijana Živković	Singer			
6	Miroslav Milanović	Opera singer			
5	Jeleče	Traditional/etno singers			
7	Biljana Drecun	Belly dancer			
8	Boris Lukman	Dancer/Michael Jackson tribute act			

Guest performer: Nina Radojičić - Čaroban

=== Semi-final 2 ===
Order	Artist	Act	Buzzes and judges' choices		
Order	Artist	Act	Mili	Danica	Ivan
1	Petar Bošković	Singer			
2	Play Dance Studio	Jazz dance group			
3	Đurađ Đuričić	Drummer			
4	Milica i Nenad	Dancers	✔	✔	✔
5	Igor Srećković	Beatboxer			
6	Siniša Marček	One man band			
7	Erhan Jusufi	Freestyle dancer			
8	Svetlana Vukomanović	Singer			

Guest performers: Miki Perić i Aleksandar Čolić - Da te ne volim

=== Semi-final 3 ===
Order	Artist	Act	Buzzes and judges' choices		
Order	Artist	Act	Mili	Danica	Ivan
1	USB	Street dancers/bicycle stuntmen	✔	✔	✔
2	Just 2 Cool	Street dancers			
3	Ivana Maksimović	Singer			
4	Katarina Đorđević - Frida	Female rapper			
5	Iva i Sara	Guitar player and a singer			
6	Anđela Nikolić	Accordion player			
7	Risto Kraćković	Magician/ilusionist			
8	Miša Mladenović	Fakir/contortionist			

=== Semi-final 4 ===
Order	Artist	Act	Buzzes and judges' choices		
Order	Artist	Act	Mili	Danica	Ivan
1	Grubb Music	Boy band			
2	Evil smile	Rock band			
3	Fenix	Dance act			
4	Aleksandar Mrakić	Singer			
5	Katarina Bogićević	Singer	✔	✔	✔
6	Draga Džinić	Opera singer			
7	Rade Zdravković	Whisler			
6	Željko i Srđan	Break dancers			

=== Semi-final 5 ===
Order	Artist	Act	Buzzes and judges' choices		
Order	Artist	Act	Mili	Danica	Ivan
1	Studio Alektik	Musicians			
2	Miodrag Spasić	Singer			
3	Sonja Škorić	Singer			
4	Maris	Street dance			
5	Katarina Jovanovic	Singer			
6	Erin's Fiddle	Irish dancers			
7	Luka Živković	Ballroom dancer			
8	Tamara i Dušan	Singer and a guitar player	✔	✔	✔

== Final ==
Key	Winner	Runner-up

Order	Artist	Act
1	Đurađ Đuričić	Drummer
2	Katarina Bogićević	Singer
3	Anđela Nikolić	Accordion player
4	Boris Lukman	Dancer/Michael Jackson tribute act
5	Kvartet Nevski	Clarinet quartet
6	Katarina Jovanovic	Singer
7	USB	Street dancers with bicycle stuntmen
8	Draga Džinić	Opera singer
9	Tamara i Dušan	Singer and a guitar player
10	Milica i Nenad	Dancers
