= TV Slagalica =

Serbian game show

- The opening screen showing the mascot, Skočko
- Serbian: ТВ Слагалица
- Created by: RTS
- Presented by: Marija Veljković; Kristina Radenković; Milica Gacin; Jelena Simić
- Countries of origin: FR Yugoslavia (1993–2003); Serbia and Montenegro (2003–2006); Serbia (2006–present)
- Original language: Serbian
- No. of seasons: 203
- No. of episodes: 10,003

Production
- Production location: Belgrade
- Camera setup: Multiple-camera setup
- Running time: 20-25 minutes
- Production company: Radio-television of Serbia

Original release
- Network: RTS 1
- Release: 22 November 1993 – present

Related
- Muzička Slagalica

TV Slagalica (Serbian Cyrillic: ТВ Слагалица; English: Puzzle TV), or simply Slagalica, is a Serbian quiz show produced by RTS and aired on RTS 1. It is based on the French show Des chiffres et des lettres. It first aired on 22 November 1993 at 7 pm. The quiz show consists of seven simple mindgames (viz., word, number and knowledge games). Contestants play for a spot in the quarter-finals, semi-finals and then the finals, winning prizes as they progress. It is presented by four hosts: Marija Veljković, Kristina Radenković, Milica Gacin and Jelena Simić. After the end of each 10th series, winners of each of the previous 10 series', with the addition of 6 runners-up, play in the "super final" using the same system as a regular series, with an additional game being played as well.

== History ==
TV Slagalica is the longest-running quiz show, which has survived competition from internationally created quiz shows with local production in Serbia (such as Who Wants to Be a Millionaire? and The Weakest Link). The original French versions of this game stopped airing in September 2024 after more than 12000 episodes.

The first show aired on 22 November 1993 under the name of Muzička Slagalica (English: Musical Puzzle). The producers changed over time, there have been a total of 20 hosts, 20 different games, 5000 contestants, the air time has changed numerous times, the studio design has changed as well as the sponsors, prizes and the name (to TV Slagalica).

On 7 April 2006 the quiz aired its 3000th episode. Since May 2007 the show has started airing daily at 19:00 Central European Time. The 157th season of TV Slagalica began airing on 2 December 2022. On 8 January 2024, the quiz aired its 9000th episode. The quiz aired its 10,000th episode on October 20, 2026.

== Programming ==
TV Slagalica is aired according to seasons. Each season has 61 episodes and in each show there are 2 contestants. The contestants are chosen by a test conducted before the quiz is filmed. Out of the total 61 episodes in each season, 40 are qualifier shows for the quarter-finals and 21 episodes are for those that have won in the previous forty episodes, competing for a spot in the top 8. Each contestant gets an award even if they are defeated by their opponent. Each episode starts with the host announcing the episode number and current season and introducing the contestants. The introduction used to include the supervisor Milka Canić that welcomed the viewers with the now iconic, greeting: Good evening.

=== Ratings ===
Even though the quiz show is not as high-tech as others, TV Slagalica has managed to bring in a high rating for its network. According to the Time Use Surveys conducted in 2021 and 2022 by the Statistical Office of Serbia around 5 percent of man and women in Serbia say that they regularly watch TV Slagalica. The show is more popular with older demographics, that aged 65 or more, with 10.25 percent of man and 9.51 percent of women watching the show regularly.

== Games ==
Slagalica - Igra sa slovima (Puzzle - Letter game)

A computer flashes letters of the Serbian Cyrillic alphabet. The first contestant says "stop" 12 times, and therefore twelve letters are displayed. The two contestants try and work out the longest Serbian word they can make from the 12 letters. Each letter is worth 1 point. If the word declared is the longest possible, an additional 5 points are awarded. The person with the word with more letters wins. The game is played twice (each contestant chooses the letters once).

Moj Broj - Igra sa brojevima (Math game)

The players randomly (by saying "stop", like in the first game) pick a 3-digit number and 6 more numbers (4 single-digit numbers, one of which is one of 10, 15 or 20 and one is 25, 50, 75 or 100). The players must use the six numbers and basic mathematical operations to get a result as close to the given number as possible. A 90-second time limit is imposed. After the time limit, the players report their results and the one with the closer result presents the equation. If the equation is wrong, the other player presents his equation. The game is played twice, each time one of the contestants picks the numbers.

Korak po korak - Igra otkrivanja pojmova (Word detection game)

The players are trying to guess the hidden word through 7 steps, with the value in points decreasing as more steps are revealed. Time takes about 5 seconds on each step, then the player in turn must guess the word. If he cannot guess, the other player tries to do it. The first step is always the hardest and last step is the easiest.

Skočko (Mastermind)

The players play mastermind game. Each player plays once and has 6 attempts to guess the 4-symbol combination. If the player fails to do so, the other player has one attempt to guess his opponents' combination. Skočko refers to the mascot of the show, which is also one of the 6 images that can form the combination. Others are playing card suits (hearts, clubs, diamonds and spades) and a star.

Slovo po slovo (Hangman)

This game is only played in the super final.

The players are offered blank letter spaces that, when filled, contain a phrase, book name, movie name and similar. The game is played twice, each time started by a different player. Each player starts off with 30 points. The player guesses a letter. When guest, the letter appears in all empty spaces it would show up in when the phrase is complete. Every time they guess a letter that appears in the clue, they lose a point, but if the letter does not appear at all, they lose three points. After the time runs out, the player guesses the phrase. If they manage to do so, they are awarded the number of points they had left. If they do not, the other player gets a chance to guess the phrase. If they manage to do so, they are awarded five points. No points are awarded if neither player guesses the given phrase.

Spojnice (Connections)

The players are offered two sets of 10 words or sentences. The game is played twice, each started by a different player. Each game has a theme, and each word from the first set needs to be paired up with the corresponding word in the other set. Each connection is worth two point. When they make a mistake, they move onto the next word, not getting points for the missed word. The process repeats until the last word. If any words remain unconnected, the second player tries to connect them, receiving one point per connection. No points are awarded for words that none of the players could connect.

Ko zna zna (General knowledge game)

Ten general knowledge questions are asked, the first one always being related to the Serbian language, and the last one always being related to sport. When the question is asked, players can apply to answer. If players apply, the player that applied first gets the opportunity to answer first. Each question is worth 10 points. If the first applied contestant does not know the answer, and the second contestant applied as well, the second contestant gets a chance to answer and vice versa. If a contestant answers incorrectly, they lose five points. It is possible for a contestant's score to fall below zero. This game brings the most points to the players, with up to 100 points up for grabs.

Asocijacije (Associations game)

Contestants must solve 2 associations. They have four minutes to do so.

=== Retired games ===
Berza (Auction game)

The players have been offered a set of questions to which the answers are 50:50 or 3:1 chance to answer correctly (most usually yes/no questions), and then the players bid which one will have more correct answers. If the highest bidder answers the exact number of questions they bid for or more, they win, otherwise, the other player takes points.

Budite detektiv (Detective game)

The players have been told about a mysterious person or object, and they must guess who the person/object is.

Dodavanje (Number adding game)

The players choose five numbers from the randomly chosen set of numbers. Then the player randomly chooses a target number, which contestants must reach by adding up their chosen numbers. They take turns adding numbers. If a player reaches the target number, they are the winner. If it is players' turn to add, and after the addition the sum becomes larger than the target number, their opponent wins.

Nije nego ("The other way around")

The players must guess the names of books, movies etc. by the title with antonym words (for example: "A Midwinter Day's Reality" for "A Midsummer Night's Dream"). Each player has five titles to guess and has five seconds for each. After that, the other player tries to guess the ones the first player missed.

== Crew ==
Current crew of Slagalica:

- Hosts: Marija Veljković, Kristina Radenković, Milica Gacin, Jelena Simić
- Director: Živojin Čelić
- Quiz coordinator: Anja Vasiljević

Gaming supervisor Milka Canić became somewhat of a staple television personality from Serbia, as she always started the show by simply greeting the contestants and the host with the catchphrase "Dobro veče" ("Good Evening"), the remark for which she became notable for being in use for more than 10 years of the show's run. Canić is not present in the studio during the competition since 2012, but is still credited as the supervisor.

== Seasons and rankings ==
As of April 2026, Slagalica is on its 197th season. Winners and rankings in each season can be seen in the table below.

Season	Winner	Runner-up	Third	Fourth
1	Ivan Jakovljević	Dragan Bešević	Jan Bažik	Nenad Komadinić
2	Dušan Nikić	Miroslav Cvetković	Branislav Nikić	Miroslav Lalić
3	Dejan Nedić	Mile Janković	Sajo Vilotić	
4	Omer Ekić	Đorđe Simić	Vitomir Pavlović	Aleksandar Vujanović
5	Marko Obradović	Miroslav Cvetković	Miodrag Vojvodić	
6	Mihajlo Nejkov	Bojan Đokanović	Veselin Sekulić	Čedomir Milanović
7	Zoran Jovanović	Dragan Radosavljević	Aleksandar Bjelica	
8	Vladan Zarić	Dario	Goran Damjanović	Gojko Šurbatović
9	Perica Đorđević	Sajo Vilotić		
10	Miodrag Vojvodić	Lazar Kojić		
11	Vladimir Pešić	Bojan Pijevac		
12	Goran Damjanović	Petar Miljković	Aleksandar Đorđević	Novica Lukić
13	Gordana Milešić	Momčilo Šaranović	Dejan Žukovski	Dejan Komar
14	Dragan Stojanović			
15	Zoran Milićević			
16	Damir Duraković	Vladimir Miletić	Nenad Mušikić	Nebojša Jevtović
17	Ilija Loncar	Arsenije Milivojevic	Goran Radović	
18	Stanko Bosnic			
19				
20	Željko Komarica	Miroljub Arsić	Sajo Vilotić	
21				
22	Andrej Pešikan	Novak Nikolić	Marjan Gosta	Miloš Đorđević
23	Goran Radović	Ivan Stamenković	Slaviša Simović	Ivica Janković
24	Marija Subotić	Vladimir Ranđelović	Srećko Golubovič	Aleksandar Kovačević
25	Aleksandra Čolakov	Milan Živanović	Dejan Doroslovački	Ivan Bukumirić
26	Predrag Antić	Milan Rmus	Dejan Jelić	Ksenija Danković
27	Sofija Necin	Vladan Zarić	Zvonko Vukićević	Dragan Milenković
28	Milenko Marković	Miloš Cvetić	Miroslav Pavlović	Milorad Cvejić
29	Đorđija Popović	Mirjana Radmilović	Vladan Stevanović	Dejan Đorđević
30	Vladimir Vujović	Sandra Trifunović	Branko Milić	Pero Đorđeski
31	Veljko Gluščević	Dragan Zeljković	Aleksandar Ćosić	Balša Nikolić
32	Milan Ivanović	Petar Tepavčević	Aleksandar Bukinac	Ivan Andonov
33	Darko Božičković	Vlastimir Purić	Dragan Pešović	Žarko Milovanović
34	Dejan Vukelić	Radomir Jovanović	Andrija Dodig	Milan Radulović
35	Jovan Ćuk	Siniša Ljustina	Gojko Šurbatović	Saša Stoiljković
36	Želimir Lalić	Saša Tonić	Vojin Ostojić	Daniel Pantović
37	Branislava Knežević	Milan Đorić	Vojislav Lazarević	
38	Dušan Babić	Branko Hristov		Milan Pavlović
39	Dragan Isailović	Svetislav Mijović	Goran Stajić	Staniša Nikolić
40	Miloš Slavković	Vladimir Krnač	Boban Luković	Sajo Vilotić
41	Aleksandar Simić	Ivan Ilić	Nikola Ivanović	Veljo Spasojević
42	Nenad Kunovac	Vojkan Veličković	Boroljub Zlatanović	Nenad Milčić
43	Dušan Jovanović	Nikola Vujičić	Goran Jovanović	
44	Marjan Gosta	Goran Avalić	Zoran Živojinović	Vladimir Vilotić
45	Jovan Stojičić	Zoran Horvatov	Igor Markov	Aleksandar Ivković
46	Draško Ešpek	Duško Gvozdenović	Dragovan Vasić	Darko Kuzeljević
47	Kosta Željski	Vladimir Jovičić	Miroslav Cvetković	Aleksa Popadić
48	Darko Krčmar	Slavko Bovan	Sava Mirčić	Đorđe Cimerman
49	Miloš Petronijević	Miodrag Petrović	Milorad Cvejić	Siniša Čolović
50	Dragan Đukanović	Branislav Bošnjaković	Bojan Janković	Srđan Radović
51	Stevan Uzelac	Miloš Stojanović	Miroslav Luka Mrković	Željko Bohinc
52	Slavka Bakalov	Zvonko Vukićević	Goran Ranđelović	Miodrag Cerović
53	Aleksandar Vesić	Đorđe Panić	Saša Radonjić	Sofija Ikonić
54	Vladimir Džamić	Vladan Mihajilović	Igor Repić	Jovan Nikolić
55	Goran Sević	Zoran Čekerinac	Zoran Krstić	Ranko Knežević
56	Velibor Marjanović	Zlatko Emeđi	Dragan Jonović	Nenad Veljković
57	Bojan Peruničić	Zoran Radisavljević	Milenko Pelević	Radosav Ilić
58	Milica Marković	Mihajlo Simić	Andrej Vujović	Ivan Branković
59	Milorad Ankić	Đorđe Lacmanović	Dragan Rajković	
60 (super final)	Mihajlo Nejkov	Novica Lukić	Vlastimir Purić	Bojan Savić
61	Vladimir Janjić	Božidar Tanić	Goran Vukojević	Dragoljub Selaković
62	Aleksandar Divović	Ivan Cvijović	Dušan Ivanović	Dragan Popović
63	Nenad Petrović	Željko Tomašević	Milan Stevanović	Bojan Subotić
64	Vladimir Nikolić	Siniša Marjanović	Ratko Aleksić	Goran Miletić
65	Veljko Mihajlović	Vladimir Obradović	Danijel Popović	Dejan Vejinović
66	Ljubiša Vidanović	Đorđe Karna	Slađan Đorđević	Ivanka Radisavljević
67	Igor Zeljković	Nikola Živanović	Žarko Stevanović	Branko Martin
68	Braca Kundalić	Nikola Stefanovic	Zoran Duvnjak	Igor Žegarac
69	Filip Vukojević	Biljana Malinović	Boško Knežević	Nikola Lukić
70	Bogdan Ivković	Dragoslava Medenica	Nenad Vujadinović	Zoran Miketek
71	Dejan Barać	Damjan Bogosavljević	Milan Jovanović	Mina Đurić
72	Vladimir Asenov	Nebojša Despotović	Milorad Todorov	Srđan Mirković
73	Radoljub Vranić	Srđan Lakić	Milan Nikolić	Jovica Đorđević
74	Nenad Nježić	Miroslav Anđelković	Uroš Jovanović	Luka Ristić
75	Milica Jokanović	Vladimir Stefanović	Marko Radosavljević	Nebojša Savić
76	Vladan Vujanović	Jovan Miljković	Sanja Tadić	Aleksandar Ostojić
77	Dragutin Đorđević	Stojan Sekulin	Igor Burlica	Branka Šorak
78	Srđan Stanković	Boban Milutinović	Borivoj Dević	Jasmina Vortić
79	Mladen Mitrović	Milorad Nedeljković	Danilo Stevanović	Nemanja Cvijić
80	Duško Sekulić	Bojan Nikolić	Đorđe Jovčić	Bojan Zdravković
81	Srđan Lončarević	Gradimir Veljković	Jovana Pavlović	Vuk Trnavac
82	Igor Biga	Radiša Nikolić	Dejan Maksimović	Aleksandar Petrović
83	Marija Gvozdenović	Dragan Kojadinović	Magdalina Čivović	Darko Jović
84	Branislav Belajev	Novica Aćimović	Marija Čivović	Jelena Lazović
85	Vladislava Stanišić	Zorana Đurđević	Branko Đorđević	Ivan Ilić
86	Božidar Ćukić	Anastazia Tokić	Jovan Javorina	Dragan Lukić
87	Dušan Erceg	Aleksandar Savić	Dragan Andrić	Nenad Rosić
88	Marko Jelić	Danijel Predarski	Darko Ostojić	Ivan Petrović
89	Jovan Error	Đorđe Dragićević	Dušan Vuković	Bogdan Ašković
90	Nikola Lacković	Dragan Kreculj	Ivan Todorov	Marko Kostić
91	Nikola Tomić	Nenad Petrović	Jana Jonlija	Predrag Lazarević
92	Vesna Bogdanović	Nikola Milošević	Aleksandar Tomašević	Slobodan Veličković
93	Srđan Selimovski	Dragan Mikić	Aleksandra Stanković	Milan Grubetić
94	Žarko Stevanović	Nikola Ilić	Aleksandar Stanković	Miroslav Kičinja
95	Bojan Lukić	Aleksandar Simić	Ivana Pešterac	Pavle Škorić
96	Marko Dukić	Dragan Spasenić	Goran Nedović	Stefan Savić
97	Vlastimir Purić	Dejan Kovačević	Vesna Prvulović	Darko Arnaut
98	Sanja Milovanović	Milica Marković	Nikola Stojanović	Dejan Mršević
99	Ivan Babić	Ilija Dragić	Dragan Isailović	Nedeljko Šujica
100 (super final)	Žarko Stevanović	Vladimir Nikolić	Sanja Milovanović	Dušan Erceg
101	Zoran Horvatov	Ljubiša Vidanović	Velibor Marjanović	Ljiljana Radulović-Dimitrov
102	Žarko Vidosavljević	Jasmina Aleksić	Aleksandar Savković	Filip Stevanović
103	Filip Tot	Nenad Isailović	Miroslav Jevremović	Uroš Armuš
104	Bojan Savić	Stevan Todorović	Miloš Petrović	Nemanja Malinović
105	Vladimir Krnač	Branimir Arsić	Milan Ugrenović	Marija Nikolić
106	Milan Vukadinović	Srđan Jeremić	Stefan Vardić	Stefan Stošić
107	Miloš Timotijević	Dragan Petrović	Aleksandar Cvrkotić	Dragan Tomašević
108	Miladin Sekulić	Boris Baćan	Dimitrije Spasić	Nikola Smiljanić
109	Jovan Mišković	Petar Rogan		
110	Zdravko Tomić	Bogdan Gavrilović		
111	Bojan Pjevac	Jugoslav Ratković		
112	Dejan Komar	Igor Burlica		
113	Petar Stojković	Vladimir Jokanović		
114	Ivan Gavrilović	Marko Protić		
115	Dejan Kovačević	Vladimir Tomić		
116	Dušan Erceg	Ljubiša Bojadžija		
117	Vladimir Mladenov	Ivan Petrović		
118	Vladimir Krnač	Neđeljko Svrkota		
119	Sergej Prošić	Želimir Lalić		
120	Janko Valenćik	Vuk Milutinović		
121 (super final)	Ivan Gavrilović	Dejan Kovačević	Dušan Erceg & Jovan Mišković	
122	Zoran Ivanović	Nemanja Mandić		
123	Darko Krčmar	Nikola Jelenić		
124	Stefan Grnčarski	Mihajlo Zdravković		
125	Rade Goljović	Dušan Macura		
126	Dragan Stojanović	Aleksandar Stanković		
127	Stefan Stanković	Danilo Ćosić		
128	Dušan Nedović	Nikola Smiljanić		
129	Nikola Mihajlović	Željko Mršević		
130	Dušan Ivanović	Vukašin Janjić		
131	Miloš Karna	Aleksandar Tomašević		
132	Aleksa Grubešić	Miloš Timotijević		
133 (super final)	Miloš Karna	Rade Goljović	Dušan Macura & Stefan Stanković	
134	Biljana Milanović	Željko Jelaš		
135	Nedeljko Šujica	Milan Novaković		
136	Aleksandar Simić	Marko Stamenković		
137	Mihajlo Nejkov	Aleksandar Milošević		
138	Slobodan Obućina	Petar Alempijević		
139	Branimir Arsić	Miladin Šakić		
140	Boris Stanković	Mirko Krstović		
141	Vlastimir Purić	Filip Stevanović		
142	Damir Duraković	Bojan Đokić		
143	Ivan Manić	Bojan Savić		
144	Đurđe Radić	Tanja Cvetinov		
145 (super final)	Branimir Arsić	Boris Stanković	Aleksandar Simić & Nedeljko Šujica	
146	Arsenije Arsić	Lazar Živkov		
147	Bogdan Cvetković	Dragan Jovanović		
148	Aleksa Stefanović	Stefan Savić		
149	Luka Radić	Dejan Vacić		
150	Đorđe Nikolić	Veselin Sekulić		
151	Miloš Spasović	Nikola Bojić		
152	Marko Nikolić	Ljubomir Babočajić		
153	Vanja Tomašev	Ivan Todorović		
154	Jovan Eror	Aleksa Krkić		
155	Kristian Knežević	Veljko Mihajlović		
156	Biljana Malinović	Dragan Isailović		
157 (super final)	Kristian Knežević	Aleksa Stefanović	Arsenije Arsić & Veljko Mihajlović	
158	Nikola Simić	Filip Kovačević		
159	Saša Stajčić	Milan Singurilović		
160	Aleksa Kondić	Dragan Jonović		
161	Stevan Brdar	Darko Živanović		
162	Dušan Popov	Dušan Miolski		
163	Stevan Todorović	Svetomir Šindić		
164	Vladimir Vulić	Dušan Bogdanović		
165	Nikola Vasić	Milorad Obrenović		
166	Dušan Grgovski	Zoran Petrović		
167	Miloš Rakita	Darko Arnaut		
168	Miloš Rakita	Aleksa Kondić	Nikola Vasić & Stevan Todorović	
169 (super final)	Filip Tot	Žarko Stevanović	Kristian Knežević & Miloš Karna	
170	Ema Avramović	Vladimir Mitrović		
171	Emil Ikonić	Danko Brajović		
172	Zoran Horvatov	Dragan Mikić		
173	Igor Burlica	Žarko Bojović		
174	Miroljub Arsić	Petar Stanisavljević		
175	Aleksandar Petrović	Vladimir Šormaz		
176	Jovan Miljković	Luka Tomašević		
177	Dušan Ivanović	Dušan Nikolić		
178	Sergej Prošić	Marko Kostić		
179	Sanja Žarković	Vladimir Milenković		
180	Bojan Nešić	Žarko Vidosavljević		
181 (super final)	Bojan Nešić	Sanja Žarković		
182	Nikola Janković	Dejan Komar		
183	Siniša Luković	Đorđe Arsić		
184	Nikola Jelenić	Goran Vukoje		
185				

=== Super finals ===
Besides regular seasons, as of March 2013, four super finals have taken place featuring the best contestants in regular seasons. The fourth super final was also counted as Season 60, which took place in 2009, and it included the total of 231 best competitors since the inception of TV Slagalica. Below is the table of super final rankings.

Superfinal	Year	Winner	Runner-up	Third	Fourth
Super final 1	1994	Jan Bažik	Dušan Nikić	Dragan Bešević	Miroslav Cvetković
Super final 2	1995	Omer Ekić	Bojan Đokanović	Mihajlo Nejkov	Đorđe Simić
Super final 3	1997	Zoran Jovanović	Aleksandar Bjelica	Novica Lukić	Lazar Kojić
Super final 4 (also Season 30)	2002	Sajo Vilotić	Marjan Gosta	Dejan Lekić	Saša Tonić
Super final 5 (also Season 60)	2009	Mihajlo Nejkov	Novica Lukić	Vlastimir Purić	Bojan Savić
Super final 6 (also Season 100)	2017	Žarko Stevanović	Vladimir Nikolić	Sanja Milovanović	Dušan Erceg
Super final 7 (2019 Winners and Runners-Up)	2019	Ivan Gavrilović	Dejan Kovačević	Dušan Erceg & Jovan Mišković	
Super final 8 (2020 Winners and Runners-Up)	2020	Miloš Karna	Rade Goljović	Dušan Macura & Stefan Stanković	
Super final 9 (2021 Winners and Runners-Up)	2021	Branimir Arsić	Boris Stanković	Aleksandar Simić & Nedeljko Šujica	
Super final 10 (2022 Winners and Runners-Up)	2022	Kristian Knežević	Aleksa Stefanović	Arsenije Arsić & Veljko Mihajlović	
Super final 11 (2023 Winners and Runners-Up)	2023	Miloš Rakita	Aleksa Kondić	Nikola Vasić & Stevan Todorović	
Super final 12 (30 years quiz show)	2023	Filip Tot	Žarko Stevanović	Kristian Knežević & Miloš Karna	
