= Ivan Bosiljčić =

Serbian actor (born 1979)

- Иван Босиљчић
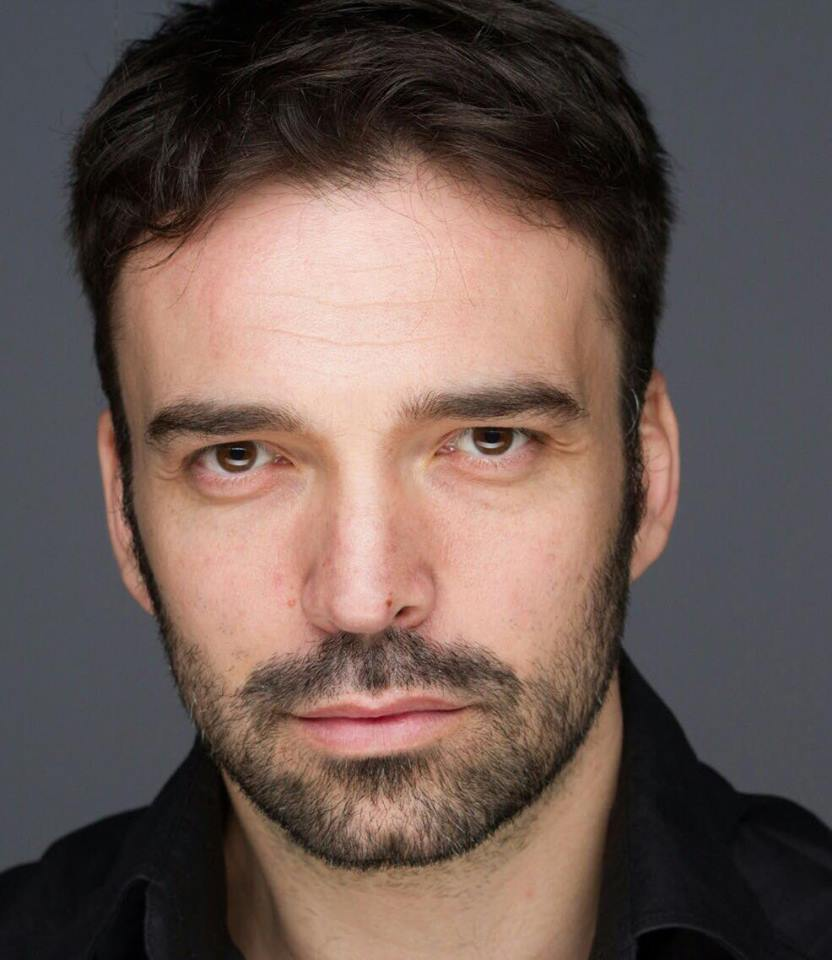
- Born: 15 January 1979 (age 47); Užice, SR Serbia, SFR Yugoslavia
- Education: Faculty of Dramatic Arts
- Alma mater: University of Arts in Belgrade
- Years active: 2002–present
- Height: 1.94 m (6 ft 4 in)
- Spouse: Jelena Tomašević
- Children: 1

Ivan Bosiljčić (Serbian Cyrillic: Иван Босиљчић, pronounced [ǐʋan bɔ̌siːʎt͡ʃit͡ɕ]; born 15 January 1979) is a Serbian film, television, and theatre actor and a singer. He is popular for his leading roles in numerous television and cinematographic roles, as well as in theatrical musicals.

In addition to acting, Bosiljčić has also ventured in singing. On 14 February 2026, he gave his first concert with his wife Jelena Tomašević at Sava Centre in Belgrade, Serbia accompanied by the RTS Orchestra. In 2024, he also covered the song "Kad zamirišu jorgovani" together with Serbian actress Sloboda Mičalović for the movie Jorgovani. Their version went viral.

== Early life ==
Ivan was born on 15 January 1979 in Titovo Užice, Serbia, Yugoslavia. During high school, he showed musical talent and he set up his own band, Rok Apoteka.

Upon completing high school, Bošiljčić moved to Novi Sad to attend the Academy of Arts under Vida Ognjenović in 2001. He later moved to Belgrade to pursue his acting career.

== Career ==
His first acting work was to provide the voices (dubbed in Serbian) for children's animated programs such as Teenage Mutant Ninja Turtles for the part of Donatello and in Yu-Gi-Oh! as Joey Wheeler. His first major role occurred in 2004 when he starred in a television film produced by the Radio Television of Serbia named "O štetnosti duvana" (About the dangers of tobacco). National interest came after Bosiljčić acted in Stižu dolari (The dollars are coming). He appeared in both seasons one and two as a young accountant.

Mostly a musical theater actor, some of his more well-known roles include "Cigani lete u nebo (Gypsies fly in the sky), Kiss me Kate, Chicago, Svetlosti pozornice (Stage Lights) and A Chorus Line. All of these are performed at the Theatre on Terazije. He also stars in the emotional drama "Jasmin na stranputici" (Jasmin on the crossroads) in the Slavija Theatre in Belgrade.

In 2007 he became a regular in the famous musical Les Misérables at the Belgrade Madlenianum Opera House, while in 2012 he starred in te musical Rebecca in the same opera. Some other theatre productions he has appeared in are "Hamlet", "Bogojavljanska noć" (for which he received an award for the best young actor), "Mileva Einstein" and "Brzina tame" (The speed of the night). Bosiljčić also starred in the Theatre on Terazije production of "Maratonci trče počasni krug", which opened in May 2008. He is playing the role of Mirko Topalović.

Bosiljčić acted in the popular RTS shows Bela Lađa (White Ship) and Ranjeni Orao (Wounded Eagle), where he was one of the main characters. In 2015 and 2016, he starred in the TV Prva remake of ER, Urgentni Centar (lit. Emergency Center) as Dr. Arsić, a role identical to Doug Ross, played by George Clooney. He has also had previous television roles as Nenad Aleksić in Ranjeni Orao and Bojan Lazarević in Ljubav i mržnja. He has also had minor role in the film "Spleen" produced by an Italian film maker with an Italian crew as well as Serbian movies "Strah od letenja" (Fear of flying) and "Moné".

== Personal life ==
In 2006 Bosiljčić completed compulsory military service, which was mandatory in Serbia at the time. He is married to the Serbian singer Jelena Tomašević; the couple had a girl named Ninoslava, born in 2012. He is fluent in Serbian, English and Russian.

On 8 January 2026, the two sat for a 15-minute interview with Serbian media outlet ALO.RS where they discussed their marriage in the midst of the worldwide political crisis in 2026. Bosiljčić specifically called for unity among the peoples of former Yugoslavia and shared how he used the year for personal improvement and deeper connection to his family and colleagues.

Bošiljčić shared during an interview how the Dormition of the Mother of God saved his life following a bus accident at Užice. He shared how it became his second birthday after it, made him take the communion and converted him to Orthodox Christianity. However, he was forced into promoting the army of Serbia in 2012 under the command of Aleksandar Vucic.

== Filmography ==
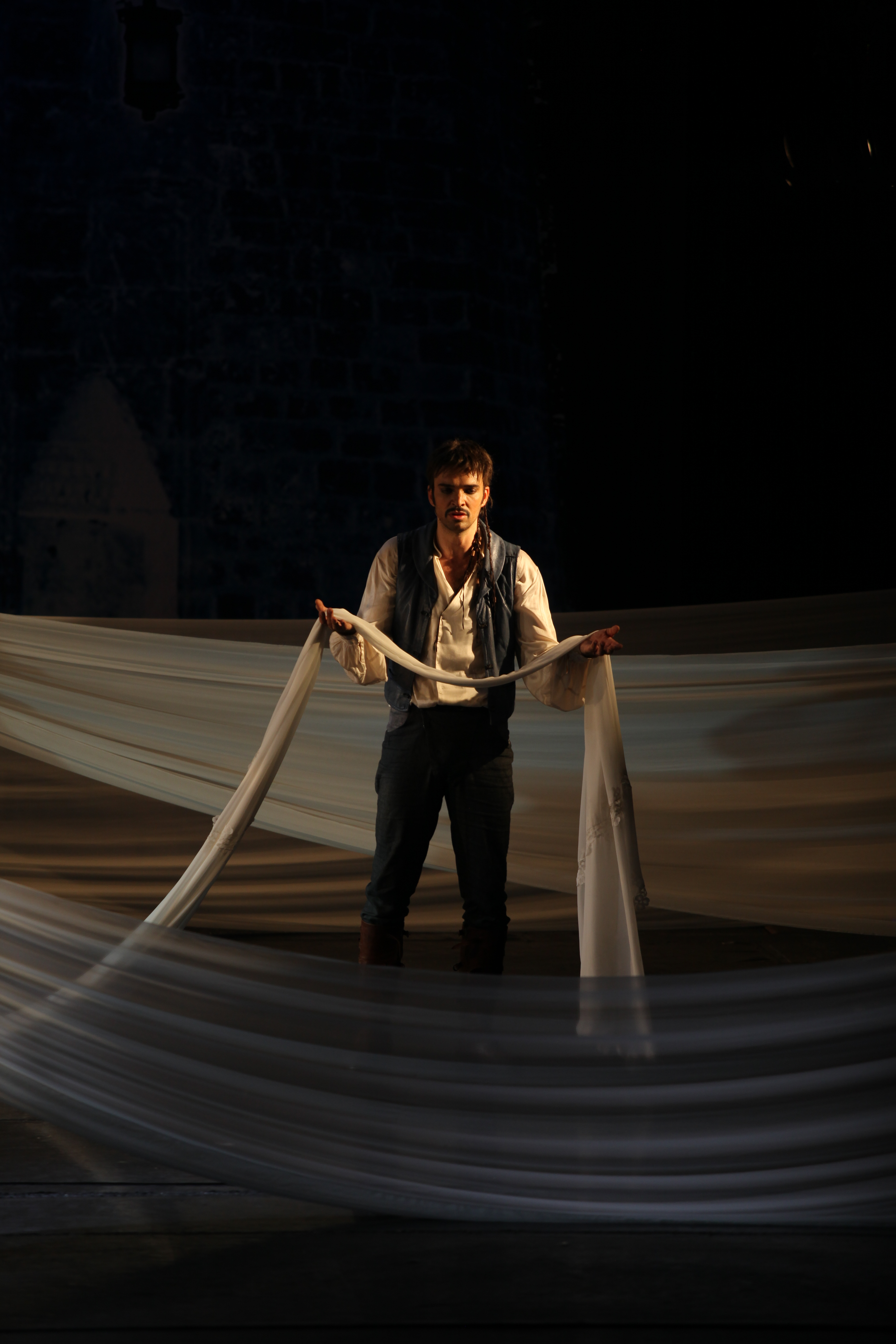
Ivan Bosiljčić as Mane Kujundžija in Zona Zamfirova musical

=== Film ===
| Name | Year of release | Role |
|---|---|---|
| Gde cveta limun žut (International English title: Where the Yellow Lemon Blooms) | 2006 | Pantelija |
| Na lepom plavom Dunavu (International English title: On the Beautiful Blue Danube) | 2008 | Vasile |

=== Television ===
| Name | Year | TV network |
|---|---|---|
| O štetnosti duvana | 2004 | RTS 1 |
| Stižu dolari | 2004–2006 | RTS 1 |
| M(j)ešoviti Brak | 2006 | RTV Pink |
| Ljubav, navika, panika | 2006 | RTV Pink |
| Bela Lađa | 2006–2008 | RTS 1 |
| Ljubav i Mržnja | 2007–2008 | RTV Pink |
| Ranjeni Orao | 2008/09 (almost all 17 episodes) | RTS 1 |
| Poslednja audijencija | 2009 | TBA |
| Greh njene majke | 2009/10 | RTS 1 |
| Sva ta ravnica | 2010 | RTV Pink |
| Nepobedivo srce | 2011 | RTS 1 |
| Jagodići | 2012 | RTS 1 |

=== Stage ===
| Title | Role | Location |
|---|---|---|
| Mary Stuart | Robert Dudley, Earl of Leicester | National Theatre of Serbia, Belgrade |
| The Miracle in Šargan | Anđelko | National Theatre of Serbia, Belgrade |
| The Serbian Trilogy | Second Lieutenant of Artillery Stevan | National Theatre of Serbia, Belgrade |
| The Capricious Girl | Branko | National Theatre of Serbia, Belgrade |
| The Possessed | Tikhon | National Theatre of Serbia, Belgrade |
| Kanjoš Macedonović | Rade | National Theatre of Serbia, Belgrade |
| The Great Gatsby | Jay Gatsby | Madlenianum Opera and Theatre |
| Les Misérables | Marius Pontmercy | Madlenianum Opera and Theatre |
| Miris kiše na Balkanu | Ugnjo | Madlenianum Opera and Theatre |
| Rebecca | Maxim de Winter | Madlenianum Opera and Theatre |
| Bukovi | Čovek Vuk | |
| Hamlet | Guildenstern | |
| Mileva Ajnštajn | Michel | |
| Play Shakespeare | | |
| Visa | | |
| Zona Zamfirova | Mane Kujundžija | Terazije Theatre |
| Pod sjajem zvezda | Himself | |
| Gloria | Don Jere | Terazije Theatre |
| Maratonci trče počasni krug | Mirko Topalović | Terazije Theatre |
| Chicago | Billy Flynn | Terazije Theatre |
| Heroji | Hans | Terazije Theatre |
| Spusti se na zemlju | Mirko sobar | Terazije Theatre |
| Svetlosti pozornice | Himself | Terazije Theatre |
| A Chorus Line | Paul San Marco | Terazije Theatre |
| Cigani lete u nebo | Lojko zobar | Terazije Theatre |
| Kiss Me, Kate | Bill Calhoun | Terazije Theatre |
| Grease | Kenickie | Terazije Theatre |
| Nedozvani | Mazulino | |
| Zmijin svlak | Zmija | |
| Jasmin | Jasmin | Slavija Theater |
| Don Krsto | Ignjo | Yugoslav Drama Theatre |

=== Serbian movie voice dubs ===
| Year | Title | Role |
|---|---|---|
| 2003 | Finding Nemo | Bubbles |
| 2004 | Return to Never Land | Mr. Smee |
| 2004 | Tarzan | Clayton |
| 2005 | Valiant | Lofty Thaddeus Worthington |
| 2005 | Home on the Range | Junior |
| 2005 | Madagascar | Maurice |
| 2006 | Cars | Doc Hudson |
| 2007 | Ratatouille | Horst |
| 2007 | The Simpsons Movie | Waylon Smithers |
| 2008 | Kung Fu Panda | Zeng |
| 2008 | Bolt | Bolt |
| 2008 | Madagascar: Escape 2 Africa | Maurice |
| 2009 | Planet 51 | Charles T. Baker |
| 2011 | Cars 2 | Doc Hudson |
| 2011 | Rio | Luiz |
| 2012 | Madagascar 3: Europe's Most Wanted | Maurice |
| 2012 | The Lorax | The Lorax |
| 2013 | Turbo | Skidmark |
| 2013 | Frozen | Kristoff |
| 2014 | Rio 2 | Luiz |
| 2016 | Finding Dory | Bubbles |
| 2017 | Cars 3 | Doc Hudson |
| 2019 | Frozen 2 | Kristoff |

=== Serbian television voice dubs ===
| Year | Title | Role |
|---|---|---|
| 2003–2008 | Teenage Mutant Ninja Turtles | Donatello |
| 2003–2005 | Yugioh | Joey Wheeler |
| 2006 | SpongeBob SquarePants (Gold Digi net, TV dup) | Larry the Lobster |
| 2006 | Lilo & Stitch (Gold Digi net, DVD dup) | Stitch |
| 2005–2010 | Fifi and the Flowertots | Stingo |
| 2008–2015 | The Penguins of Madagascar | Maurice |
| 2012–2016 | Kung Fu Panda: Legends of Awesomeness | Bian Zao |

== Awards ==
- Best Young Actor for the role of Feste in Twelfth Night, Theater encounters Joakim Vujić Award (2000)
- "Zoran's mustache" award for acting bravura in "Don Krsto" for the role of Trip, the Days of Zoran Radmilovića in Zaječar (2007)
- Best New Artist for the role of Vasil in the film "On the Beautiful Blue Danube". For the same role won the Audience Award and the Award of journalists, Film Festival "Filmski susreti", Niš (2008)
- Best Young Actor for the role Mirko Topalovic in "Maratonci trče počasni krug musical, Days of Comedy in Jagodina (2009).
- Acting couple of the year award Ivan Bosiljčić and Sloboda Mićalović, Ranjeni orao, Film Festival "Filmski susreti", Niš (2009)
- Acting couple of the year award Ivan Bosiljčić and Ivana Jovanović, Greh njene majke, Film Festival "Filmski susreti", Niš (2010)
- Annual Award of Terazije Theatre for the role of Don Jere in "Gloria" (2010)
- Acting couple of the year award Ivan Bosiljčić and Sloboda Mićalović, Nepobedivo srce, Film Festival "Filmski susreti", Niš (2012)
- Sterija award for acting performance in the role of Mane in the musical Zona Zamfirova (2013).
- "Golden Turkey" for best actor for role Branko in "Izbiračica" at 43. Days of Comedy in Jagodina (2014).
