= Santa Maria della Salute (film) =

- Directed by: Zdravko Šotra
- Starring: Vojin Ćetković; Tamara Aleksić
- Release date: 20 December 2016
- Running time: 118 minutes
- Country: Serbia
- Language: Serbian

Santa Maria della Salute is a 2016 Serbian biographical film about the Serbian poet Laza Kostić.

== Cast ==
- Vojin Ćetković – Laza Kostić
- Tamara Aleksić – Lenka Dunđerski
- Sloboda Mićalović – Olga Dunđerski
- Nela Mihailović – Sofija Dunđerski
- Aleksandar Đurica – Lazar Dunđerski
- Nebojša Ilić – Dr. Milan Savić
- Milica Grujičić – Julijana Palanački
- Aleksandar Berček – Arhimandrit Gavrilo
- Svetlana Bojković – Ana Palanački
