= Sloboda Mićalović =

Serbian actress (born 1981)

- Слобода Мићаловић
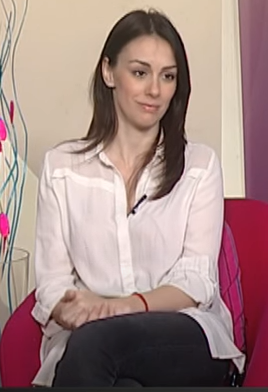
- Born: Sloboda Mićalović; 21 August 1981 (age 45); Leskovac, SR Serbia, SFR Yugoslavia
- Occupation: Actress
- Years active: 2001–present
- Spouse: Vojin Ćetković (m. 2008)

Sloboda Mićalović Ćetković (Serbian Cyrillic: Слобода Мићаловић Ћетковић; born 21 August 1981), better known as Sloboda Mićalović, is a Serbian actress. She is best known for her roles in film Zona Zamfirova and television series M(j)ešoviti brak and Ranjeni orao.

== Early and personal life ==
Sloboda Mićalović was born on 21 August 1981 in Leskovac, Yugoslavia. She is a daughter of actor Dragan Mićalović, and has two sisters, Mirjana and Dragana. As a child, Mićalović wanted to be an opera singer and took serious singing lessons.

Mićalović is a close friend of actresses Zorana Bečić and Ana Franić. In 2008 she married fellow actor Vojin Ćetković in Belgrade and took his surname, thus she is commonly dubbed Sloboda Mićalović–Ćetković. In February 2010 she gave birth to twin girls, Mila and Vera. The couple and their children live in Novi Beograd, Belgrade.

== Career ==
Mićalović began her career on stage. After small roles on film and television, she made her breakthrough with the role of Vaske in 2002 film Zona Zamfirova, starring Katarina Radivojević and Vojin Ćetković. Mićalović then portrayed Jelena Čađenović in the RTV Pink television series M(j)ešoviti brak, starring Milutin Karadžić and Dara Džokić, from 2003 to 2007. In 2007 and 2008 she acted in Serbo-Croatian television series Ne daj se, Nina, a version of telenovela Yo soy Betty, la fea, and also appeared as Queen Natalija Obrenović in television film Kraljevina Srbija.

In 2008 and 2009 Mićalović starred in the RTS television series Ranjeni orao, which became the most-watched Serbian television series of all time. She was also considered for the role of Katarina in 2009 film Sveti Georgije ubiva aždahu, eventually given to Nataša Janjić. In 2011/2012 she starred in television series Nepobedivo srce.

== Filmography ==
Film
Year	Film	Role	Notes
2002	Klasa 2002	Cameo Appearance	Television Film
2002	Zona Zamfirova	Vaska	
2002	Ko čeka dočeka	Cameo Appearance	Television Film
2003	Ilka	Draga	Television Film
2004	Pljačka Trećeg rajha	Sana	
2008	Kraljevina Srbija	Queen Natalija Obrenović	Television Film
2016	Santa Maria della Salute	Olga Dunđerski	
Television
Year	Title	Role	Notes
2002	Podijum	Emanuela	
2003	Laku noć, deco	Herself	Guest Appearance
2003—2007	M(j)ešoviti brak	Jelena Čađenović	
2004	Tragom Karađorđa	Jelena	
2007—2008	Ne daj se, Nina	Vanesa Tintor	
2008—2009	Ranjeni orao	Anđelka Bojanić	Main role
2015	Čizmaši	Sofija	
2017	Nemanjići — rađanje kraljevine	Anna Dandolo	

== Discography ==
=== Soundtrack albums ===
- 2002 — Zona Zamfirova

Awards
New title	Serbian Oscar Of Popularity; The Female Actor of the Year; 2009	Succeeded by Ljiljana Stjepanović
