= Jelena Dimitrijević =

Serbian writer

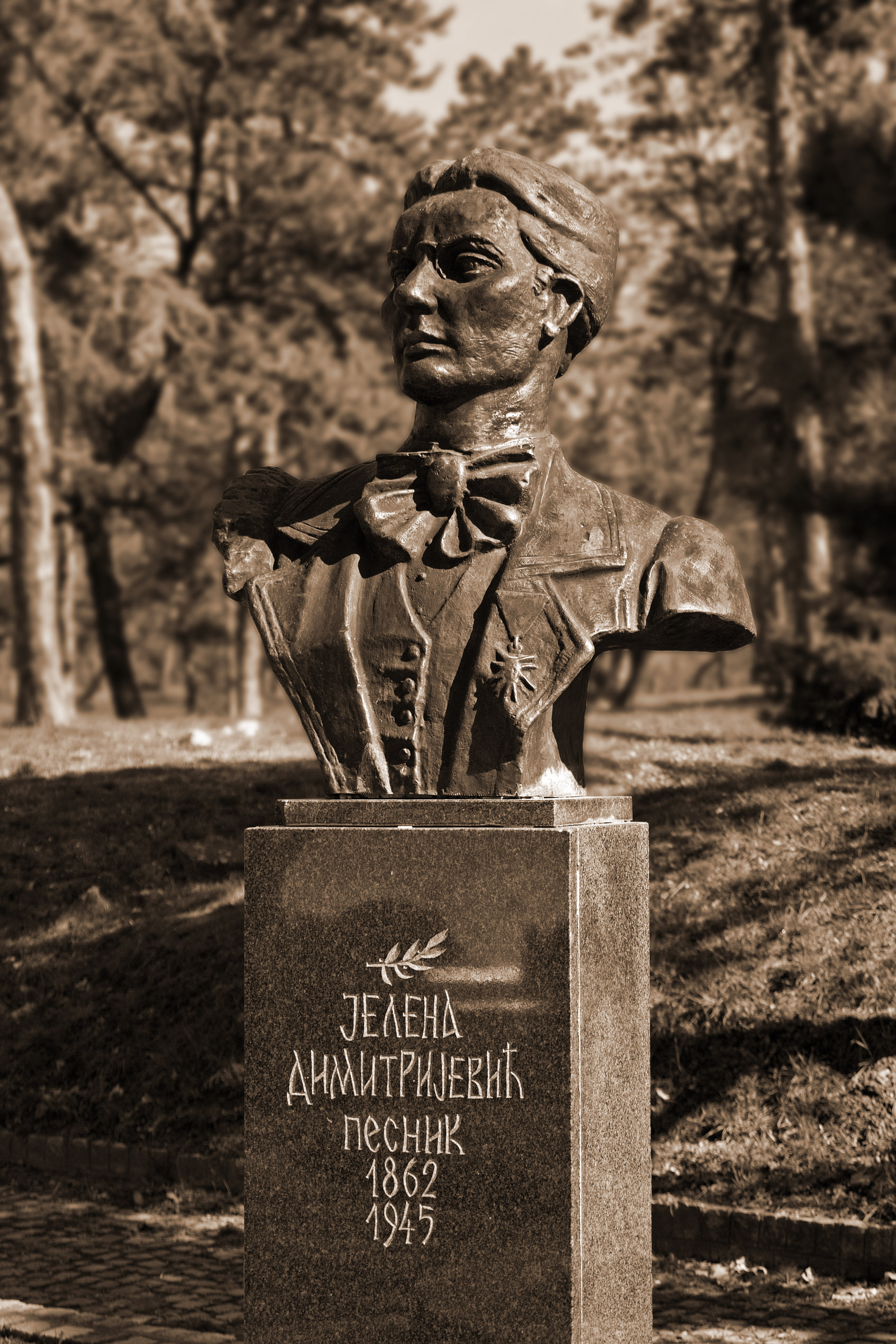
Bust of Jelena J. Dimitrijević

Jelena Dimitrijević (27 March 1862 – 10 April 1945) was a Serbian short story writer, novelist, poet, traveller, social worker, feminist, and a polyglot. She is considered to be the first woman in modern Serbian history to publish a work of travel related prose in 1894. During the years 1926 to 1927 she traveled around the world, including the Far East, East Asia, and India, where she was the guest of Rabindranath Tagore.

== Biography ==
Dimitrijević was born in Kruševac on 27 March 1862, and featured as a prominent Serbian writer of the late 19th- and early 20th-century. She taught herself to speak French, English, Russian, Italian, Greek and Turkish. She was raised in a respected and wealthy family, in the spirit of Serbian cultural heritage and Orthodox religion.

From an early age, she dedicated herself to writing – notwithstanding a childhood eye injury that forced her to leave school, and against medical advice forbidding her to read. She had a great support in her husband Jovan Dimitrijević. Besides supporting her writing and social activities, he was often her fellow traveler and the person she could completely rely on. Dimitrijević travelled widely, describing her experiences of Greece, India, Egypt, and America in a series of books. When he died, she was in mourning for the rest of her life.

In 1881 they moved to Niš, which had been part of the Ottoman Empire until 1878. She devoted her energies to the study of Muslim women, and in 1897 published Pisma iz Niša o haremima (Letters from Niš Regarding Harems) – "... the first Serbian prose book written and published by a female author." Among her achievements were gaining an understanding of the lives of Turkish women, including access to the private world of the harem, and undertaking a journey around the world in her sixties. Such portraits are a valuable counter to the narrow conceptions of nineteenth- and early twentieth-century feminism which sees it firmly rooted in north-west Europe and North America. For example, "Jelena was proud to have met Mrs Hoda Sha’arawi, the founder of the Egyptian Feminist Union; an encounter she wrote about in great detail in her acclaimed 1940 travelogue Sedam mora i tri okeana (Seven Seas and Three Oceans) which deals with her travels across the Near East Her most important novel Nove (New Women) deals with the dilemmas facing educated Muslim women in the twentieth century in relation to their traditional way of life. For Nove Dimitrijevic won the prestigious Matica Srpska prize for literature in 1912.

She also wrote lyric poetry as well as novels, but is possibly most famous for her Pisma iz Nisa o Haremima, a semi-fictionalised, semi-historical, anthropological narrative containing portraits of life in the Turkish harems 50 years before her birth when the south-Serbian city of Niš was still a part of the Ottoman Empire, and Pisma iz Soluna/Letters from Salonica, a genuine travelogue from the Ottoman Empire during the Young Turk Revolution in 1908, of which Salonica was the centre. The Letters were published first in Srpski književni glasnik (Serbian Literary Review) in 1908–09, and then as a separate book in 1918 in Sarajevo. An English translation was published in 2017.

By the beginning of the 20th Century she and her husband were living in Belgrade and she was a member of the Serbian Writers' Society. She died in Belgrade on 10 April 1945, aged 83.

== Works ==
- Jelenine pesme (Pesme Jelene Jov. Dimitrijevića), 1894.
- Pisma iz Niša o haremima, 1897.
- Đul-Marikina prikažnja, short stories, 1901.
- Fati-Sultan, Safi-Hanum,Mejrem-Hanum, short stories, 1907.
- Nove, 1912.
- Amerikanka, 1918.
- Pisma iz Soluna, 1918.
- Pisma iz Indije, 1928.
- Pisma iz Misira, 1929.
- Novi svet ili u Americi godinu dana, 1934.
- Une vision, 1936.
- Sedam mora i tri okeana. Putem oko sveta, 1940.

== See also ==
- Isidora Sekulić
- Mir-Jam

== Sources ==
- Jelena Dimitrijević (1986). "Pisma iz Niša o haremima". National Library of Serbia.
- Slobodanka Peković (2008). "Putopisi Jelene Dimitrijević kao mogućnost viđenja Drugog (117-35)" [Jelena Dimitrijević's travellogues] (in Serbian). Belgrade, Serbia: Institute for Literature and Arts. Archived from the original on 19 April 2021.
- Hawkesworth, Celia, Voices in the Shadows: Women and Verbal Art in Serbia and Bosnia, published by Central European University Press (Budapest, New York, 2000).
- Skerlić, Jovan, Istorija Nove Srpske Književnosti/A History of New Serbian Literature (Second Edition, 1921), p. 476.
