= Vojin Ćetković =

Serbian actor

- Војин Ћетковић
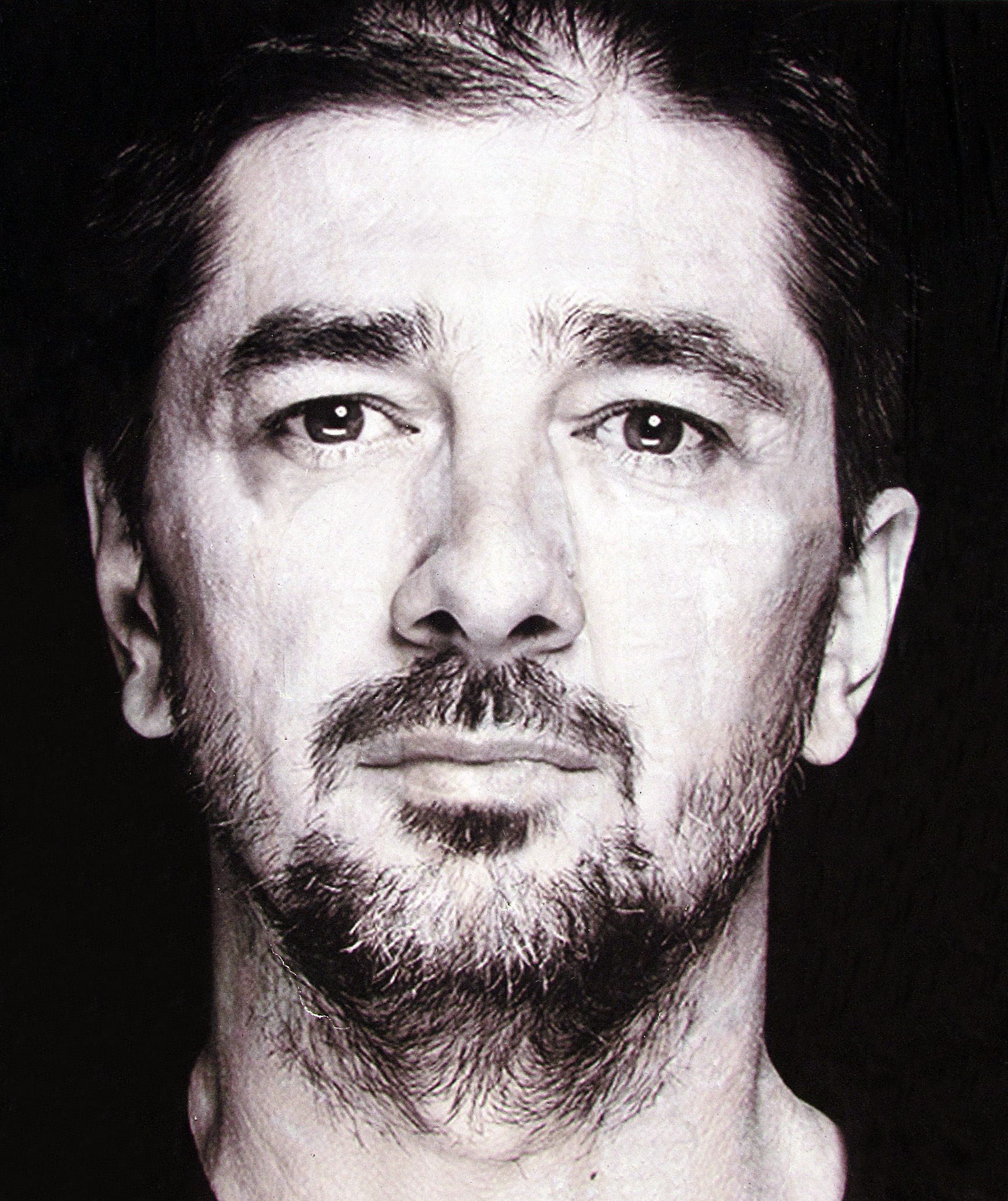
- Ćetković in May 2015
- Born: 22 August 1971 (age 55); Kruševac, SR Serbia, SFR Yugoslavia
- Education: Faculty of Dramatic Arts; University of Arts in Belgrade
- Occupation: Actor
- Years active: 1993–present

Vojin Ćetković (Serbian Cyrillic: Војин Ћетковић; born 22 August 1971) is a Serbian actor. He is best known for his role in the TV series Porodično blago.

== Selected filmography ==
=== Television ===
Year	Title	Role	Notes
1993	Heaven	Tomin drug (Toma's friend)	TV movie
1995	Simpatija i antipatija	Dimitrije	TV movie
1998	Dosije 128	Miroslav Bojić, slikar	TV movie
1998–2002	Porodično blago	Goran 'Brando' Gagić	TV series
2000	A sad adio	Brando	TV movie
2005	Vila Maria	Djordjie Vučinić	TV series
2005	Zlatno runo	Kir Kajsunizade, lekar	TV movie
2007–2008	Vratiće se rode	Vražalić	TV series
2008–2009	Ranjeni orao	Tomo Djurović	TV series
2008–2011	Moj rođak sa sela	Milomir Vranić	TV series; lead role
2008–2015	Ulica lipa	Ivan	TV series
2009–2010	Greh njene majke	Jovan	TV series
2010	Sva ta ravnica	Svetozar	TV series
2011–2012	Cvat lipe na Balkanu	Dušan Antić	TV series
2012–2014	Montevideo, God Bless You!	Mihajlo Andrejević	TV series
2013	Šešir profesora Koste Vujića	Direktor Kozarac	TV series
2017	Santa Maria della Salute	Laza Kostić	TV mini-series
2018	Nemanjić Dynasty: The Birth of the Kingdom	Stefan the First-Crowned	TV series
2021–	Tajne vinove loze	Vuk Tomović	TV series
2021	Alexander of Yugoslavia	Dimitrije, Serbian Patriarch	TV series

=== Film ===
Year	Title	Role	Notes
1998	The Dagger	Ljubo Nikšićanin	
2001	Boomerang	Zgodni	
2002	Zona Zamfirova	Mane Kujundžija	
2004	The Robbery of the Third Reich	Franc Beme	
2005	Ivko's Feast	Fizikus	
2007	Hadersfild	Dule	
2007	Klopka	Vlada	
2014	See You in Montevideo	Mihailo Andrejević	
2016	Santa Maria della Salute	Laza Kostić	Lead role

== Personal life ==
He is married to Sloboda Mićalović, a Serbian actress. They have two daughters, Mila and Vera. He is the godfather of two of actor Nebojša Glogovac's sons.
