= Terazije Theatre =

- Позориште на Теразијама; Pozorište na Terazijama
- Official logo

- Location within Belgrade
- Address: Terazije 29
- Location: Stari Grad, Belgrade, Serbia
- Coordinates: 44.8128627°N 20.4593324°E
- Owner: City of Belgrade
- Type: Theatre

Construction
- Opened: 1949; 77 years ago
- Renovated: 2005
- Architect: Georgije Samoylov

Website
- www.pozoristeterazije.com

Theatre on Terazije (Serbian: Позориште на Теразијама, romanized: Pozorište na Terazijama) is a Broadway-style theatre located in Belgrade, Serbia.

Located in Terazije square, it is the only theatre in Serbia which exclusively produces musicals and has produced the Serbian versions of Chicago, Kiss Me, Kate, and many more. Due to its reconstruction, which started in 2003 and ended in 2005, it is also one of the most up-to-date and technologically advanced theatres in Serbia.

== History ==
The Theatre on Terazije was opened in 1949, with an actors' ensemble as well as ballet, choir and orchestral ensembles. The building of the Terazije theatre in the same named area in Belgrade’s city centre was created by Georgije Samoylov, a Russian immigrant who completed his studies at the University of Belgrade's Faculty of Architecture.

At the end of 1991-92 season, The theatre was closed in order to undergo long overdue reconstruction. The ensemble had temporarily relocated to the cultural institution "Vuk Karadžić", with expectations that they would return to the reconstructed building within two seasons. However, due to the ethnic conflicts in the former Yugoslavia during the 1990s, the theatre lost most of its funding and produced small musicals in difficult conditions. In 2000, when a political change occurred in Serbia and it was once again accepted into world organisations, the project of reconstructing old, out of date theatres in Belgrade began. In 2003 it was the theatre on the Terazije that finally came under reconstruction.

=== Reconstruction ===
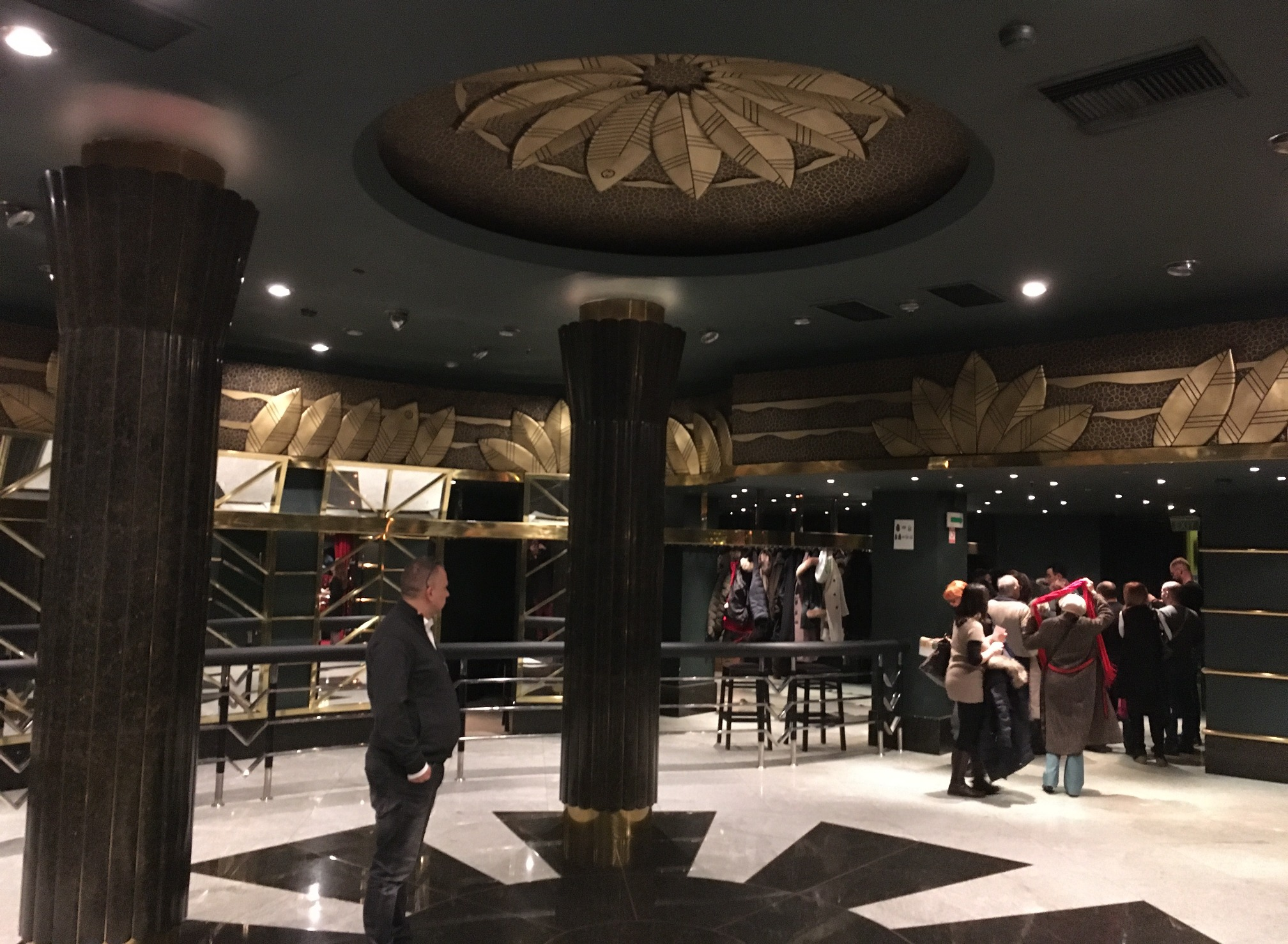
Lobby of the Theatre on Terazije

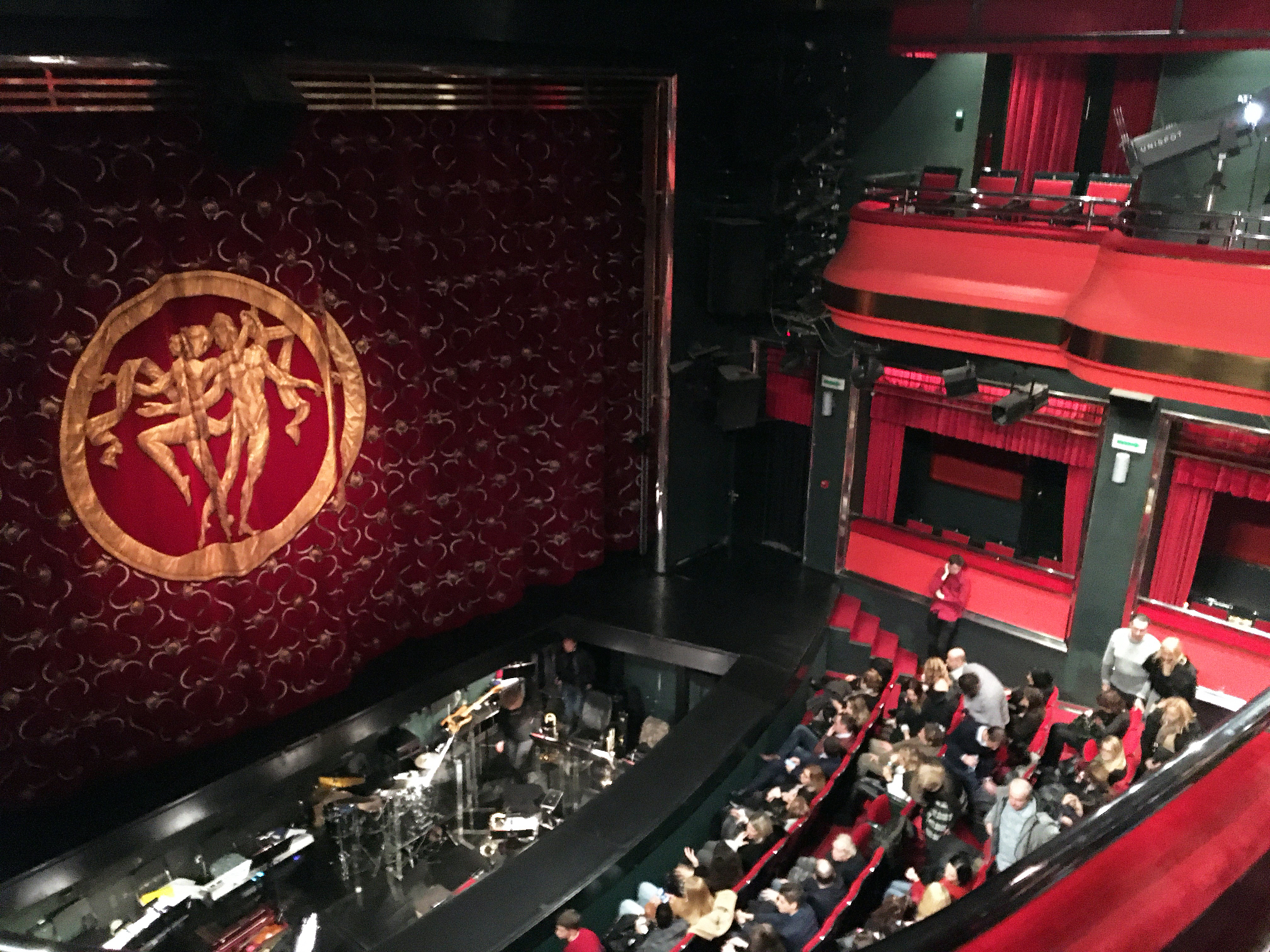
The main stage

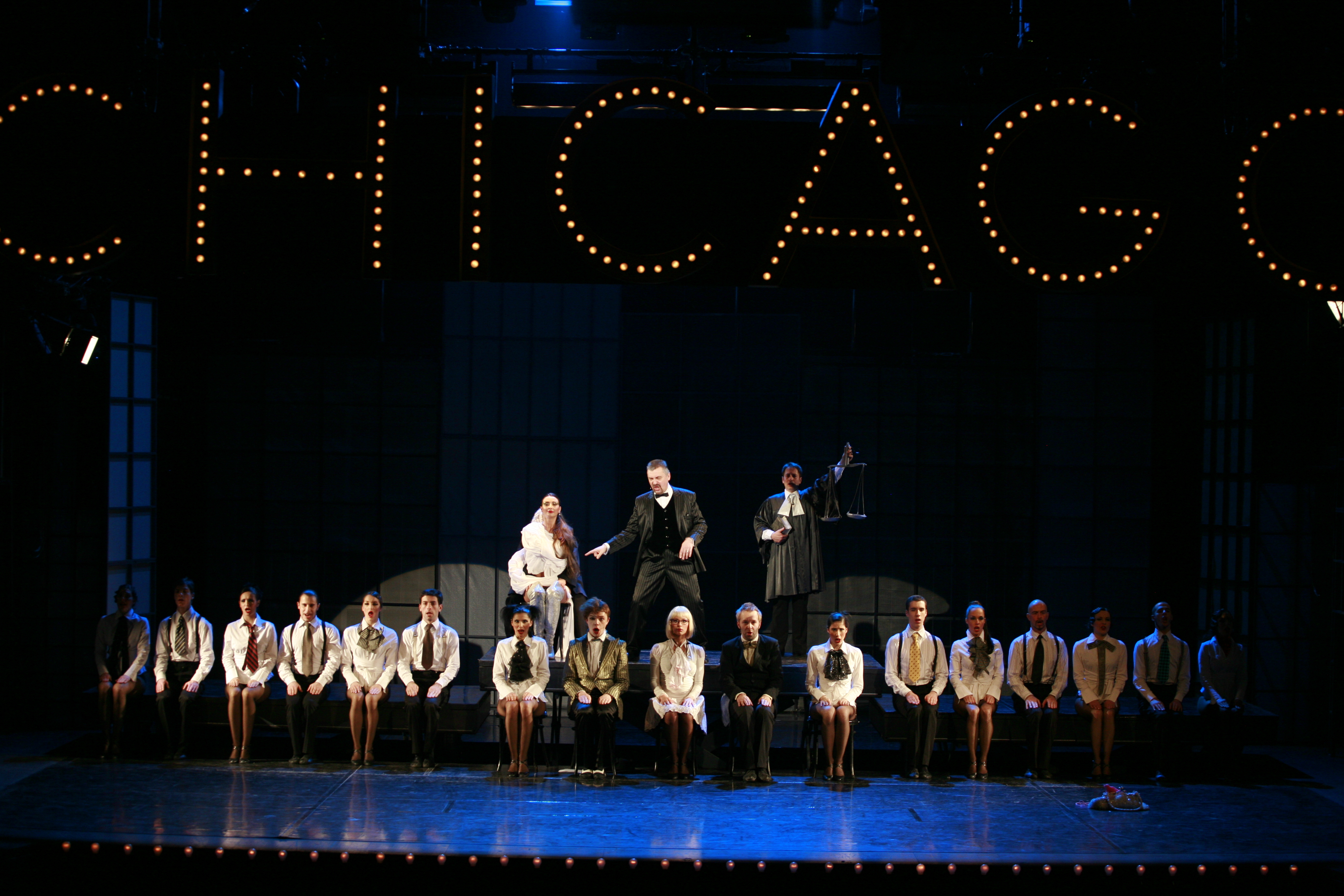
Chicago has been staged more than 100 times

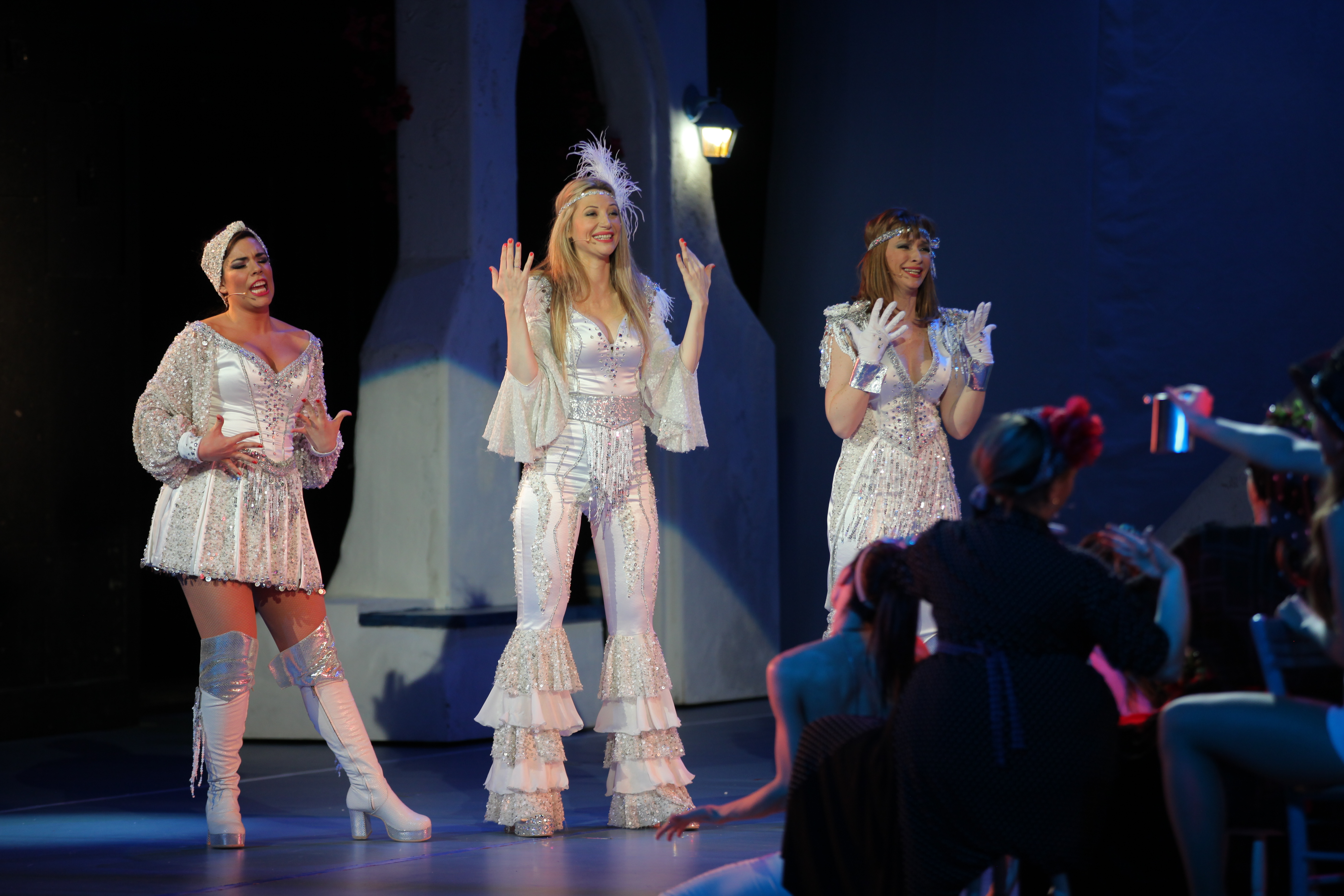
Mamma Mia!

On 28 September 2003 the reconstruction of the Terazije began. The theatre was in a very bad shape having its underneath levels flooded and its performance hall in a nearly derelict state. The company Partnet Engineering devised the new look which cost the city authorities nearly 740 million Serbian dinars. The reconstruction included investment into new technology and a performance hall which would be comparable to Broadway theatres. The new theatre was opened on the 6th of July, 2005 with a complete new look. The luxurious new theatre became extremely appealing to Belgraders. Finally the city had an all-exclusive musical theatre it lacked for 13 years.

== Popularity boom ==
After the opening of the reconstructed theatre a new generation of actors became involved at the Theatre on Terazije. Singers/actors such as Ivana Knežević, Ivan Bosiljčić, Jelena Jovičić, Slobodan Stefanović, Miroljub Turajlija, Milan Antonić, Sloboda Mićalović and many others bought a resurgence in popularity to musicals in Serbia. The high quality of technical resources has also increased the theatre’s popularity with most musicals receiving rave reviews from critics for acting, singing and stage. The theatre on Terazije has brought many adaptations from Broadway to Serbia. Currently the theatre is constantly booked out and those wanting to see a play must book their tickets well in advance to see a play. The theatre has its own orchestra and choir.

One of the theaters most successful actors, Milenko Zablaćanski died in 2008 in a car crash, Terazije Theatre pull down all performances where Milenko was playing, and in his honor, named small scene, Cabaret scene "Milenko Zablaćanski".

== Productions ==
Partial repertoire of the theatre with former and active musicals and plays (the flags on the side indicate from which countries the musicals were originally created):

- (Serbia) Front-page Doll (1999)
- (United States) Kiss Me, Kate (2002)
- (Serbia) Pop Ċira i Pop Spira (2003)
- (Mexico) Rosa de dos aromas (2004)
- (Serbia) Svadba u kupatilu (2005)
- (Serbia) Svetlosti pozorišta (2005 - opened the reconstructed theatre)
- (France) Les Femmes Savantes (2005)
- (Serbia) Heroji (2005)
- (Serbia) Żivot Jevremov (2007)
- (Italy) La Capinera (2007)
- (United States) A Chorus Line (2007)
- (United States) Cabaret (musical) (2007)
- (United States) Grease (musical) (2009)
- (Serbia) Ženidba i udadba (2012)

=== Active Performances ===
- (Russia) Tabor ukhodit v nebo (2004)
- (United States) Some Like It Hot (2007)
- (United States) Chicago (2006)
- (United States) The Producers (2011)
- (United States) Zorba (musical) (2011)
- (Serbia) Glavo luda (2012)
- (Serbia) Zona Zamfirova (2012)
- (United States) Victor/Victoria (musical) (2014)
- (United Kingdom) Mamma Mia! (2015)
- (Serbia) Mister dolar (2017)
- (United Kingdom) The Phantom of the Opera (2017)
- (United States) Inside Out (musical) (2018)
- (United States) The Drowsy Chaperone (2019)
- (Serbia) Sa druge strane jastuka (2020)

== See also ==
- List of theatres in Serbia
