= Mir-Jam =

Serbian writer (1887–1952)

- Native name: Мир-Јам
- Born: Milica Jakovljević; 22 April 1887; Jagodina, Kingdom of Serbia
- Died: 22 December 1952 (aged 65); Belgrade, PR Serbia, FPR Yugoslavia
- Occupation: Novelist, Short story writer, dramatist

Milica Jakovljević (Serbian Cyrillic: Милица Јаковљевић; 22 April 1887 – 22 December 1952), better known under the pen name Mir-Jam (Serbian Cyrillic: Мир-Јам) was a Serbian writer whose many period novels have been successfully adapted to popular TV series.

== Biography ==
She was born on April 22, 1887, in Jagodina. She lived in Kragujevac, but moved to Belgrade after World War I. She worked as a journalist for Beogradske Novosti and, later for Nedeljne Ilustracije. During this time she published many love stories and novels under the pseudonym Mir-Jam. Her work consists of easy-to-read love stories written in very picturesque and descriptive style, which brings her constant popularity to this day. The value of her work lies in detailed and realistic representation of everyday life in Yugoslavia between the World Wars. Because of this, she was nicknamed Serbian Jane Austen.

She was fluent in Russian and French. Although she frequently wrote about marriage, she was never married. She died in Belgrade on December 22, 1952. Mir-Jam was the sister of writer Stevan Jakovljević.

Mir-Jam enjoyed a resurgence of popularity when her novel Ranjeni orao (Wounded Eagle) got adapted into a TV series directed by Zdravko Šotra and was broadcast on RTS between 2008 and 2009. Based on the popularity of Ranjeni orao, the subsequent shooting of Greh njene majke, another TV adaptation of Mir-Jam's novel, began on June 26, 2009 and reached high levels of popularity as well. Her work “Nepobedivo srce” and “Samac u braku” were also adapted to a small screen soon thereafter.

== Works ==
=== Novels ===
- Ranjeni orao (Wounded Eagle)
- To je bilo jedne noći na Jadranu (One Night on the Adriatic Sea)
- Nepobedivo srce (Invincible Heart)
- Otmica muškarca (Kidnapping of a Man)
- Greh njene majke (Her Mother's Sin)
- U slovenačkim gorama ( In The Slovenian Mountains)
- Mala supruga (A Little Wife)
- Samac u braku (Single in a Marriage)
- Izdanci Šumadije (Origins of Sumadija)

=== Short stories collections ===
- Dama u plavom (The Lady in Blue)
- Časna reč muškarca (A Man's Word of Honour)
- Sve one vole ljubav (They All Like Love)
- Devojka sa zelenim ocima (The Girl with Green Eyes)
- Prvi sneg (First Snow)

=== Plays ===
- Tamo daleko (Somewhere Far Away)
- Emancipovana porodica (Emancipated Family)

== See also ==
- Jelena Dimitrijević
- Isidora Sekulić
