= Radio Television of Serbia =

National public broadcasting service of Serbia

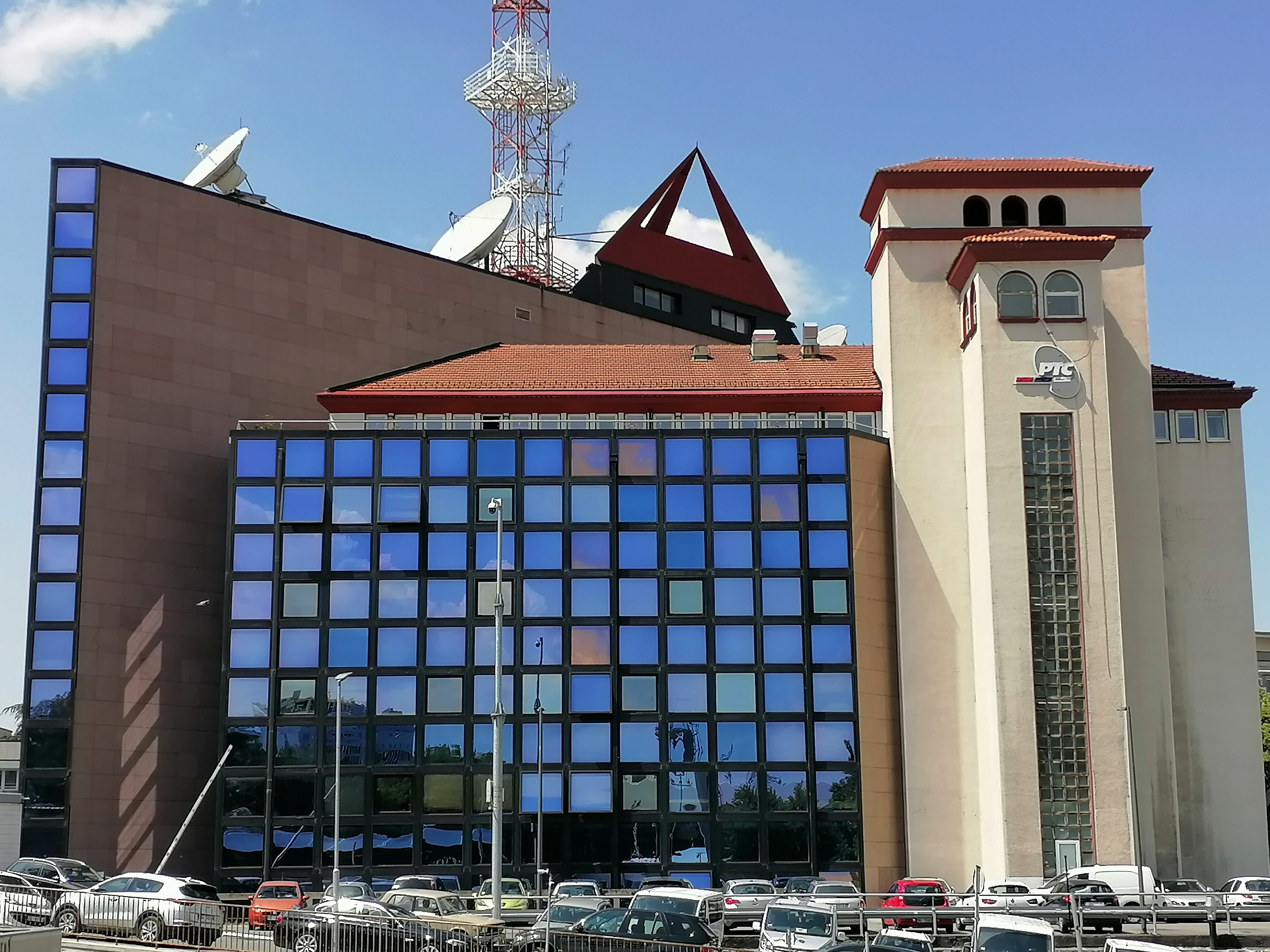
- RTS headquarters in Belgrade
- Native name: Радио-телевизија Србије; Radio-televizija Srbije
- Formerly: Radio-televizija Beograd (RTB) (1958–1992)
- Type: State-owned broadcaster
- Industry: Broadcast radio, television and online
- Founded: 1 October 1924; 102 years ago (as Radio Belgrade-Rakovica); 24 March 1929; 97 years ago (as Radio Belgrade); 23 August 1958; 68 years ago (as Radio Television Belgrade); 1 January 1992; 34 years ago (as Radio Television of Serbia); 3 May 2006; 20 years ago (current form); 1 May 2010; 16 years ago (First broadcast in HD)
- Headquarters: Takovska 10, Belgrade, Serbia
- Area served: Worldwide
- Key people: Vacant (General director)
- Revenue: ▲€125.10 million (2023)
- Net income: ▼€-3.62 million (2023)
- Owner: Government of Serbia
- Members: European Broadcasting Union
- Website: www.rts.rs

Serbian Broadcasting Corporation, also known as Radio Television of Serbia (RTS), (Note: Serbian: Радио-телевизија Србије; РТС, Radio-televizija Srbije; RTS) formerly known as Radio Television Belgrade (RTB) (Note: Serbian: Радио-телевизија Београд; РТБ, Radio-televizija Beograd; RTB) from 1958 to 1992, is the state-owned public radio and television broadcaster of Serbia. RTS has four organizational units – radio, television, music production, and record label (PGP-RTS). It is financed primarily through monthly subscription fees and advertising revenue.

== History ==
=== Radio Belgrade-Rakovica (1924–1929) ===
Radio Belgrade is among the oldest electronic media in Europe and its first broadcast from the radio-telegraph station was in Rakovica on 1 October 1924 as Radio Belgrade-Rakovica. Every Tuesday, Thursday, and Saturday from 6:45 PM to 7:45 PM, concerts were broadcast, along with news, service information, advertisements, water level updates, and stock market reports. The news was prepared by journalists from Politika and Dnevne novosti, while the music portion of the program was directed by the Belgrade Opera.

Engineers Mihailo Simić and Dobrivoje Petrović broadcast the first test concert on 19 September 1924, from a studio at Knez Mihailova 42, through a transmitter in Rakovica. Ksenija Rogovska sang an aria from "Tosca", Žika Tomić performed Stevan Hristić's composition "Behar", Karel Holub played Mendelssohn's "Violin Concerto in E minor", and pianist Velizar Gođevac played two Chopin etudes. Vitomir Bogić recited the scene "Under the Balcony" from Edmond Rostand's Cyrano and sonnets by Jovan Dučić. Since the test concert sparked great public interest, it was repeated a week later.

From 1924 to 1929, radio professionals gradually mastered transmission techniques and program creation and obtained the necessary licenses.

=== Radio Belgrade (1929–1958) ===
Radio Belgrade began its broadcasts in 1929. The first news announcer in 1929 was Jelena Bilbija. The first radio program in Serbia was broadcast in February 1929, when released radio signal was transmitted from the transmitter in Belgrade suburb of Rakovica. After five years, on 24 March 1929 Radio Belgrade began its regular broadcasting program, with art music.

During World War II, because of its relative proximity to North Africa, and the fact it had a limited number of gramophone records, Radio Belgrade -- then requisitioned by the Nazi German occupiers and renamed Soldatensender Belgrad (Soldiers' Radio Belgrade) -- was the place where the schmalzy homesick longing song Lili Marlen became broadcast fairly regularly and thus gained enormous popularity among both German and Allied soldiers.

=== Radio Television Belgrade (1958–1991) ===
Radio Television Belgrade (RTB), consisting of Radio Belgrade and Television Belgrade (TVB) was established as a result of the decision by the Executive Council of the Socialist Republic of Serbia on 13 February 1958. This came after the Socialist Federal Republic of Yugoslavia's government decision of 1956 to invest in a television network.

The first televised broadcast was on 23 August 1958, an edition of the Dnevnik (Journal) news programme with Miloje Orlović, Branislav Surutka, Olga Nađ, Olivera Živković and Vera Milovanović. The first RTB program was broadcast from the Belgrade Fair and from a new TV Studio build there. From 1961, RTS began to use quadruplex video tape recording equipment. The Sixties saw dramatic development in all genres of TV programs. TVB became famous by its sitcoms, directed and written by Radivoje-Lola Djukić, Novak Novak and others (only a small portion was able to be preserved). TVB also had documentary programs (series Karavan, Reflektor and others) and quizzes. By 1970, the entire territory of Serbia was covered by the RTS signal. On 31 December 1971, TVB started broadcasting in PAL color system on its second network. A new AM (radio) broadcast equipment in Zvečka, Obrenovac, with 2000 kW transmitter was purchased in 1974.

After the political turmoil in the 1970s (against the "liberals") the program of RTB became more sterile, however, in the 1980s it reached the zenith.

In 1989, preparation for the formation of the RTS system officially began. That same year, 3K TVB started broadcasting as the youth, alternative TV channel. Along with it, Radio 101 started broadcasting in Belgrade and Vojvodina. Radio 101 was the more commercial youth radio, carrying pop and turbo-folk hits. It was intended to complement the more alternative Belgrade 202.

In 1990, a few regional studios (Niš, Kragujevac, Jagodina, Šabac) officially started broadcasting regional programming via a window in place of "Beogradska hronika".

In 1991, all public broadcasters within Serbia began the formation of the RTS network system by merging their stations and programming direction to RTB, which served as flagship of the RTS network.

=== Radio Television of Serbia (1990s) ===
During the March 1991 anti-war demonstrations in Belgrade, the protesters issued a series of demands, one of which was the sacking of RTB's general director, Dušan Mitević. The Yugoslav government eventually relented and removed Mitević from his position at RTB. On 8 October 1991, four RTB journalists were killed on the Glina–Petrinja road, in central Croatia, while covering Yugoslavia's civil war.

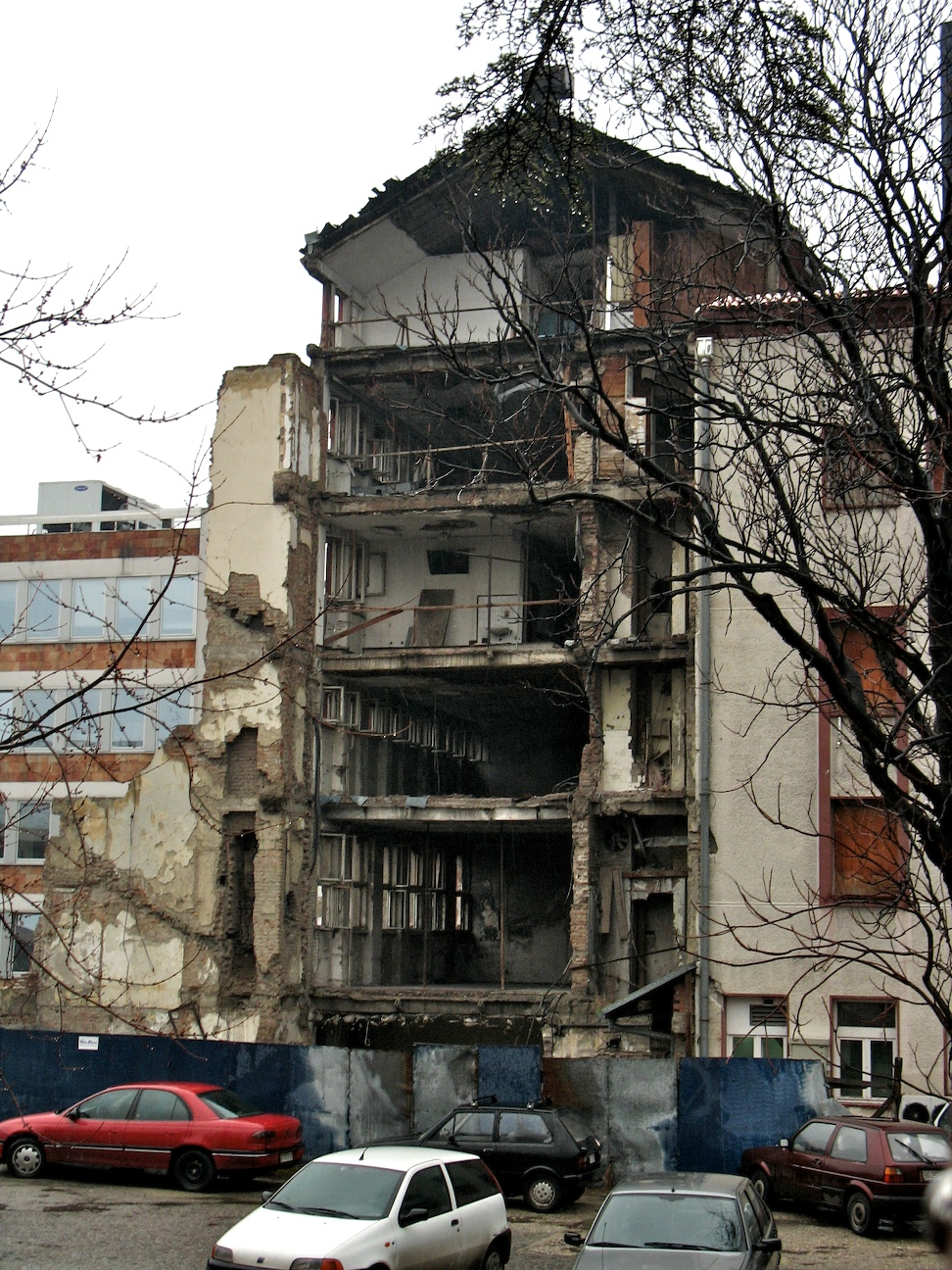
RTS headquarters damaged after NATO bombing

RTS was established in 1992 with the merger of RTB and regional networks Radio-Television Novi Sad and Radio-Television Priština into a true national network. All transmitters, relay stations, antennas and other television equipment once owned by these broadcasters were inherited by RTS. As Yugoslavia disintegrated, RTS's journalistic standards plummeted. During the Siege of Dubrovnik, RTS claimed that smoke rising from the city's Old Town was the result of automobile tires set on fire by locals. During the Siege of Sarajevo, RTS newscasts showed an image of Sarajevo from the 1980s, untouched, thereby downplaying the severity of the siege. As the wars dragged on, the Yugoslav government began terminating the employment of many dissenting journalists. By January 1993, nearly 1,300 RTS employees – amounting to one-third of the broadcaster's pre-war workforce – had been fired.

RTS was active during the Kosovo War and the concurrent NATO bombing of Yugoslavia. On 20 April, the Supreme Allied Commander Europe, General Wesley Clark, ordered that RTS was to be bombed off the air. NATO missiles struck RTS at 2:06 a.m on 23 April. Serbia's Minister of Information, Aleksandar Vučić, who would become Prime Minister in 2014 and President in 2017, scheduled to appear on CNN's Larry King Live from RTS's headquarters at 2:30 a.m., narrowly escaped the bombing. Sixteen RTS employees were killed and an additional 16 were injured. The human rights organization Amnesty International condemned the attack and described it as a war crime. NATO officials stated that the alliance considered RTS a legitimate target because of its "biased and distorted coverage" of the war. The bombing temporarily forced RTS off the air, but it resumed broadcasting several hours later, and continued to do so for the rest of the conflict.

Most of RTS's headquarters was reconstructed after the war, but part of it was left in ruins as a memorial to those killed. The victims of the bombing were later memorialized by the Zašto? (transl. Why?) monument in Belgrade's Tašmajdan Park. In 2002, Dragoljub Milanović, the general manager of RTS, was sentenced to nine-and-a-half years' imprisonment for failing to evacuate the broadcaster's headquarters despite repeated threats by NATO officials that it would be bombed.

=== Radio Television of Serbia (2000s) ===
After Milošević's removal from power, RTS underwent reconstruction in order to regain respect amongst much of its audience which the network had lost during the '90s. Particular emphasis was put on news programming which suffered greatly during the 1990s. In 2006 RTS became the most viewed television network in Serbia and has retained this position since then. Early that year, RTS decided to shut down one of its television channels. 3K (Treći kanal RTS-a) was a channel dedicated to the youth, which, however, became the main film, series and sports channel in the late 1990s and the early 2000s.

General directors

- 1955–1959: Mirko Tepavac
- 1959–1962: Dušan Popović
- 1962–1972: Zdravko Vuković
- 1972–1985: Milan Vukos
- 1985–1988: Ratomir Vico
- 1989–1991: Dušan Mitević
- 1991–1991: Ratomir Vico
- 1992–1992: Dobrosav Bjeletić
- 1992–1995: Milorad Vučelić
- 1995–2000: Dragoljub Milanović
- 2000–2001: Nenad Ristić
- 2001–2004: Aleksandar Crkvenjakov
- 2004–2013: Aleksandar Tijanić
- 2013–2015: Nikola Mirkov
- 2015–2026: Dragan Bujošević
- 2026: Manja Grčić

In 2007, the BBC World Service Trust launched an extensive training programme at Serbia's national broadcaster. This 30-month project, which was funded by the European Union, provided extensive journalism, craft and management training to all levels of staff at the broadcaster.

In 2008, RTS underwent major changes as it celebrated 50 years of existence. The network launched its digital network which uses DTT Digital terrestrial television via several DVB-T transmitters. It has also invested millions in new technology. The new high-definition television system was first put in place in May for the 2008 Eurovision Song Contest while on 26 November 2008, RTS began airing its new channel "RTS Culture and Arts" which is a DTT-only channel, transmitted in 16:9 standard definition format, with stereo and 5.1 digital audio. During 2008 the networks web presentations was greatly improved. On 23 August 2008, the 50th anniversary of Dnevnik (the RTS news bulletin) was celebrated. A special edition of the 19:30 Dnevnik was aired with Mića Orlović, the first newsreader to host the news in Serbia, hosted the special addition helped by Dušanka Kalanj, the first female newsreader in Serbia. The theme of the evening's news included a reflection on the past 50 years a projection of the future as well as the news of the day. The weather was read out by Kamenko Katić, the first weather forecaster. All babies born on 23 August 2008, received a flat screen television set from RTS. On 9 September 2009, at 21:00 CET, RTS launched its first high definition channel – RTS HD.

RTS was the host broadcaster of the semi-final and finals of the Eurovision Song Contest 2008. Serbia gained the rights to host the contest after Marija Šerifović's 2007 victory in Helsinki, Finland. The Eurovision Song Contest 2008 was held in Belgrade. RTS broadcast the event as usual (since 2004) on RTS1. The host couple were Jovana Janković and Željko Joksimović. The rating of the final of Eurovision was overwhelming with 4,560,000 people tuning in to watch making it the most watched event on Serbian television as well as on RTS.

=== Radio Television of Serbia (2010s) ===
In 2011, RTS issued a written apology to the citizens of Serbia and former Yugoslavia for its actions during the regime of Slobodan Milošević and the break up of Yugoslavia. The letter apologises for the network's senseless reporting and the hurt it caused to the public. It vows "never to let history repeat itself."

On 23 August 2014, at the 56th anniversary of the broadcaster, RTS got a new visual identity: focusing on new on-screen logos introduced on 18 February for their terrestrial channels. At the same day, the watermarks changed themselves to fit into the 16:9 format.

Since the entry of the Serbian Progressive Party and Aleksandar Vučić to power after 2012, RTS has been regularly accused of being biased in favor of the incumbent SNS government and against the opposition. Multiple reports have indicated that the state broadcasting service and its Vojvodinian counterpart have given disproportionate time to the government and pro-government voices during election campaigning. The opposition has called for resignations from the board of the Regulatory Authority for Electronic Media and the Radio Television of Serbia during anti-government protests.

== Television ==
RTS has two TV centers: in addition to the main TV production center within RTS headquarters complex in the downtown Belgrade, there is also TV production center in Košutnjak (housing two largest studios: Studio 8 and Studio 9). RTS offers live programming on its website.

=== Channels ===
There are currently five channels:

- RTS 1 is the oldest television station in Serbia, launched on 23 August 1958 as Televizija Beograd. It is available nationally free-to-air and is the most watched television channel in the country beating the other two most popular television networks in Serbia, RTV Pink and Prva. RTS1 offers viewers political shows and debates and domestic and international shows. RTS1 airs a range of locally produced dramas, which are among the most watched television shows in Serbia.
- RTS 2 is first colour television station in Serbia, launched on 31 December 1971 as TVB 2. Available nationally free-to-air, it focuses on educational programmes and sporting events. Parliamentary sittings are also broadcast live on RTS2.
- RTS 3 is first digital-only channel which began broadcasting on 26 November 2008 as RTS Digital. The channel, available nationally free-to-air, mainly airs cultural programmes, with emphasize on music (classical musical and jazz performances, in particular) broadcasting various concerts as well as ballet performances. Among other things, the channel broadcasts the Vienna New Year's Concert.
- RTS Svet, launched on 14 May 1991, is the satellite service created to serve the Serbian diaspora across the world. It broadcasts the most popular programmes from RTS1, RTS2 and RTS3. RTS Svet now covers Australia, Europe, North America and Eurasia (Russia, Belarus, Kazakhstan, Armenia).

RTS also operates a number of domestic pay-TV channels; these are: RTS Drama, RTS Život, RTS Trezor, RTS Kolo, RTS Muzika, RTS Nauka, RTS Klasika and RTS Poletarac. Former channels include RTS 3K, that was broadcast from 1989 to 2006 and replaced by TV Avala.

=== Programming ===
==== News programmes ====
News programmes are produced in Belgrade, however the network has a total of 25 news offices in the country. RTS also has its own correspondents and offices outside of Serbia in: Moscow, London, Brussels, Paris, Rome, Vienna, Washington, D.C., Chicago, and Tokyo.

RTS has the most watched news and current affairs programmes in the country, according to the AGB Nilsen Serbian ratings. The centerpiece of RTS news programming is the Dnevnik (English: Journal), which is the network's main news programme and is aired on RTS1. The Dnevnik bulletins are aired at 8:00 (runs for approximately 25 minutes), 12:00 during workweek and 13:00 Saturdays and Sundays (around 15 minutes, excluding Sports Review and Weather forecast), 19:30 (between 35 and 40 minutes) and at 23:00 (approximately 20 minutes). The flagship (evening) Dnevnik has been the most watched news programme in Serbia since 2003, averaging between 1.5–2 million viewers nightly.

The following are news and current affairs aired on RTS:

- Dnevnik (Journal)
- Jutarnji program (Morning programme)
- Oko magazin (Eye review)
- Šta radite, bre (What are you doing, bre?)
- Ovo je Srbija (This is Serbia)
- Beogradska Hronika (Belgrade chronicles)
- Srbija na vezi (Serbia calling)
- Građanin (Citizen)
- Dozvolite... (Allow us...)
- Uviđaj (Investigation discovery)

==== Entertainment ====
The RTS entertainment is largely based on local production of Serbian drama programmes, soaps and musical programmes. Recently RTS has started investing more in local drama and as a result has been rewarded with high ratings. An episode of the RTS drama Ranjeni orao aired on 15 January 2009, is the most watched scripted drama episode in Serbian broadcasting history with over 3 million viewers.

RTS also broadcasts various world entertainment events as part of its entertainment programming including the Vienna New Year's Concert and Academy Awards ceremony. The network has transferred a lot of its cultural programming and documentaries, originally broadcast on RTS2, to the RTS3. The network holds rights to air major entertainment events such as the Eurovision Song Contest and Junior Eurovision Song Contest. In 2008, RTS produced the 53rd Eurovision Song Contest.

The following is a list of entertainment programmes produced and aired by RTS (as of October 2011):

- Gastronomad (Cooking nomad)
- Mira Adanja-Polak i Vi (Mira Adanja-Polak and You)
- TV Slagalica (TV Puzzle)
- Bingo i pesma (Bingo and song)
- Plava ptica (Blue bird – children's show)
- Uviđaj (Investigation)
- SAT (SAT-Saobraćaj, Automobilizam, Turizam/TCT – Traffic, Cars, Tourism)
- Žikina šarenica (Žika's Motley Rug)
- Kvadratura kruga (Squaring the Circle)
- Balkanskom ulicom (Balkan Street Chronicles)
- Veliki izazov (The great challenge – quiz show )
- Na slovo na slovo (I spy – children's show)

The following is a list of drama series produced and aired by RTS (as of October 2011)

- Nepobedivo srce
- Cvat lipe na Balkanu
- Jagodići
- Vojna akademija
- Zaboravljeni umovi Srbije
- Dramska triologija 1941–1945

RTS also relies on dramas and soaps produced outside of Serbia as well as documentary programmes.

The following is a list of internationally created shows currently broadcast by RTS (as of October 2011):

Original name	Serbian translation	Channel	Origin
Criminal Minds	Злочиначки умови (Zločinački umovi)	RTS1	United States
Band of Brothers	Браћа по оружју (Braća po oružju)	RTS1	United States
Saving Grace	Како спасити Грејс (Kako spasiti Grejs)	RTS1	United States
The Sopranos	Породица Сопрано (Porodica Soprano)	RTS2	United States
Postman Pat	Поштар Пат (Poštar Pat)	RTS2	United Kingdom
Ozie Boo!	Ози бу (Ozi bu)	RTS2	France
Thomas & Friends	Томас и другари (Tomas i drugari)	RTS2	United Kingdom
Maya the Bee	Пчелица Маја (Pčelica Maja)	RTS2	Germany
Mickey Mouse	Мики Маус (Miki Maus)	RTS1	United States

==== Sports programming ====
RTS is a major player in Serbian sports broadcasting. Major sporting events are aired on RTS1, especially if a Serbian team or athlete is participating while all other sports broadcasting is aired on RTS2.

The network has several shows which are specially dedicated to sports, aired on both RTS1 and RTS2. RTS broadcast its first Summer Olympic Games in 1996 (previously the Olympics were broadcast in Serbia through Yugoslav Radio Television, JRT) and has held broadcasting rights for both the Summer Olympic Games and Winter Olympic Games ever since. RTS also holds rights to broadcast the FIFA World Cup, UEFA European Championship, FIBA World Cup, EuroBasket, FIVB Men's World Championship, FIVB Women's World Championship, FIVB Volleyball World League, European Men's Handball Championship, European Water Polo Championship, IAAF World Championships in Athletics, European Athletics Championships, Davis Cup, Fed Cup, Wimbledon, Roland Garros, US Open, Australian Open, etc. It has exclusive rights to the Serbian Cup football matches.

==== Iconic programmes ====
- TV Slagalica (TV Puzzle) is the longest running quiz show in the Balkans. It has been on RTS programming since 1993 has always had a solid ratings.
- Bolji život (A better life) is one of the most iconic Yugoslav shows ever produced. Made during the '80s and '90s it works through the problems of a few families. The show brought in huge ratings for the network during its dark days of the '90s and after the production of the show ceased RTS has continually re-run the series.
- Otpisani (Disposable Heroes) is a 1970s Serbian TV series, aired on RTS, based around youths from the resistance movement in Nazi-occupied Belgrade that are high on the Gestapo's termination list. The series has achieved something of a cult status among its audience. The television series has been encored a total of seven times.
- Srećni ljudi (Happy people) is the most successful, long running, television series aired between 1993 and 1996. The most watched drama series in Serbia.
- Ranjeni orao (Wounded eagle) based on the novel by Serbian author Mir Jam, the 17-episode show premiered in December 2008. Produced by Zdravko Šotra, the show had a cast of popular Serbian actors, most notably Sloboda Mićalović, Ivan Bosiljčić and Dragan Nikolić. The show is based in the Kingdom of Yugoslavia between the two world wars and centres around the love life of Anđelka Bojanić. The show received extremely positive critical reviews and outstanding ratings. The show's final episode on 19 January 2009 was watched by 3,277,000 people, making it the most watched television show in Serbia. Due to viewer requests, once the show ended it was immediately reprised in primetime, making it the fastest repeated show on RTS. In its repeats it also managed to produce extremely high ratings.

== Radio ==
RTS operates 4 radio stations, under the name Radio Belgrade.

- Radio Belgrade 1 is the flagship channel which provides comprehensive news and current affairs programmes to the public as well as entertainment and culture shows.
- Radio Belgrade 2 is a cultural station based around social dialogue which constantly broadcasts thoughts about life and creation abroad and in Serbia. The station is known for documentary reporting, religious discussions, classical music, evergreen, jazz and satire. Radio Belgrade 2 shares the same radio waves as Radio Belgrade 3 and is broadcast from 6:00 until 20:00.
- Radio Belgrade 3 focuses on classical music and radio dramas. Radio Belgrade 3 shares the same radio waves as Radio Belgrade 2 and broadcasts from 20.00 until 06.00.
- Radio Belgrade 202 broadcasts short news segments, rock and pop music. Hosts of various music programmes on the radio often ask listeners to send in their thoughts via SMS or the Internet. Belgrade 202 also has a special morning programme broadcast from 06.00 until 09.00. which is based around current cultural, social and political trends.

Since 18 September 2019, RTS also operates a number of online thematic stations; these are RTS Pletenica (folk music, ensembles and soloists), RTS Rokenroller (rock and pop music) and RTS Džuboks (evergreen music), as well as RTS Vrteška which is intended for children and parents.

== Other ==
RTS has an archive of its TV programmes. In addition to 5000+ video tapes in the long obsolete quadruplex format, the archive contains tapes in C-type helical scan, U-matic, beta-SP and digital formats. Also, the archive contains an extensive collection of newsreels, short filmed stories, and feature films on 16 mm and 35 mm tapes.

PGP-RTS is a music production company owned by the television network, starting with production in 1958 under the name PGP-RTB and used to be one of two largest record labels in the former Yugoslavia. Today, it is the third largest record label in Serbia (after Grand Production and City Records).

== Correspondents ==
RTS has 24 correspondence centers across Serbia. Those are located in:

- Čačak
- Jagodina
- Kikinda
- Kragujevac
- Kraljevo
- Kruševac
- Kuršumlija
- Leskovac
- Loznica
- Niš
- Novi Pazar
- Novi Sad
- Pančevo
- Pirot
- Požarevac
- Prokuplje
- Smederevo
- Šabac
- Užice
- Valjevo
- Vranje
- Vršac
- Zaječar
- Zrenjanin

It also has 9 correspondence centers abroad:

- Vienna, Austria
- Brussels, Belgium
- Paris, France
- Rome, Italy
- Tokyo, Japan
- Moscow, Russia
- London, United Kingdom
- Chicago, United States
- Washington D.C., United States

== See also ==
- Yugoslav Radio Television
