= Bence House =

Serbian department store

Coordinates: 45.38°N 20.39°E

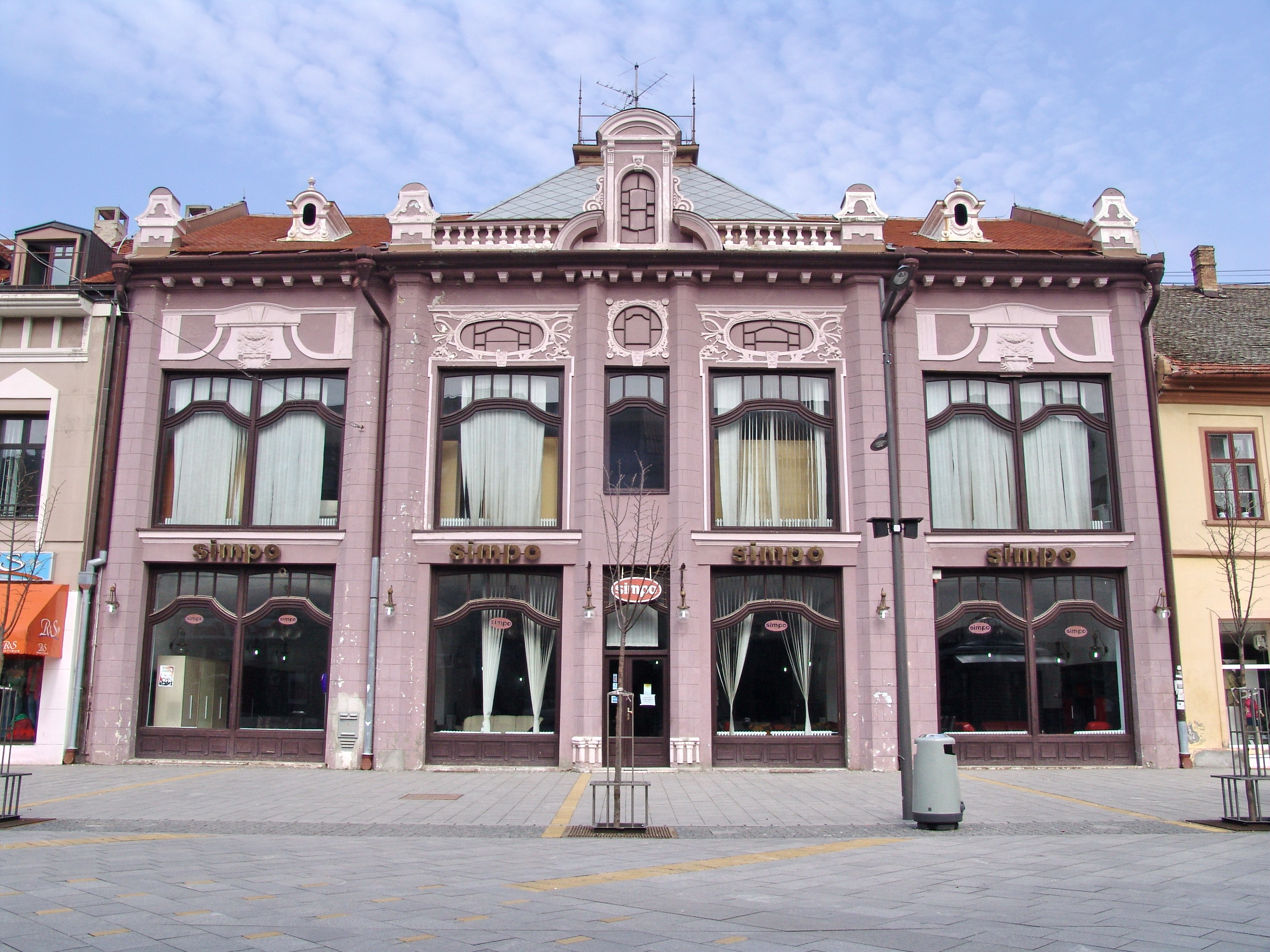
Bence House in Zrenjanin

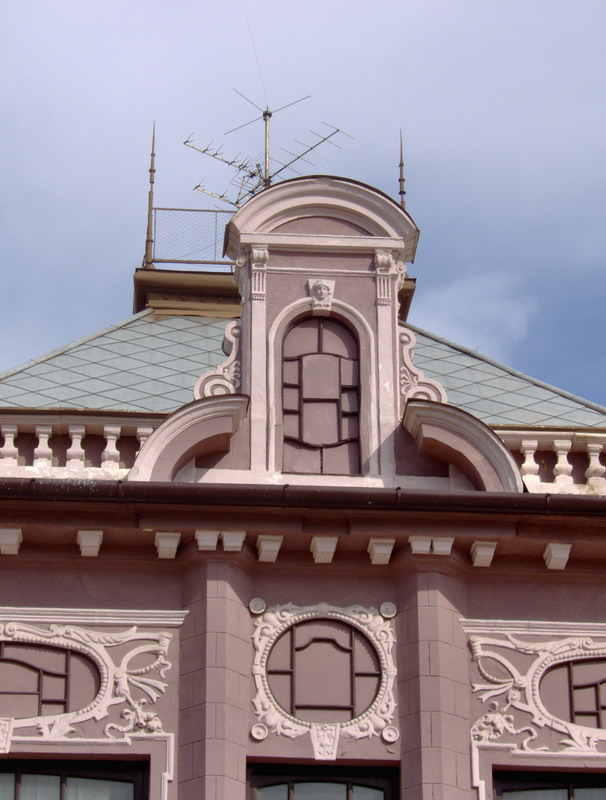
Bence's house-detail of the facade

Bence House (Serbian: Бенцеова кућа) is a palace in Zrenjanin, Serbia. It was built in 1909 in the style of Vienna secession.

== History ==
The palace was projected as a modern department store. The owner of the palace was Miksa Bence, owner of the local furniture factory (established in 1861). He wanted to have a huge, modern showroom for his products. Building has large shop-windows, which shows that it was a trade object.

Bence's house represents the first modernly designed building in the King Alexander I Street, main pedestrian street in Zrenjanin.

As of 2010, Bence House is still a furniture shop.
